= List of Italian regions by highest point =

This is a list of Italian regions by highest point. In one case, two regions (Basilicata and Calabria) share the highest point (Serra Dolcedorme), as it is located on their border.

== List ==
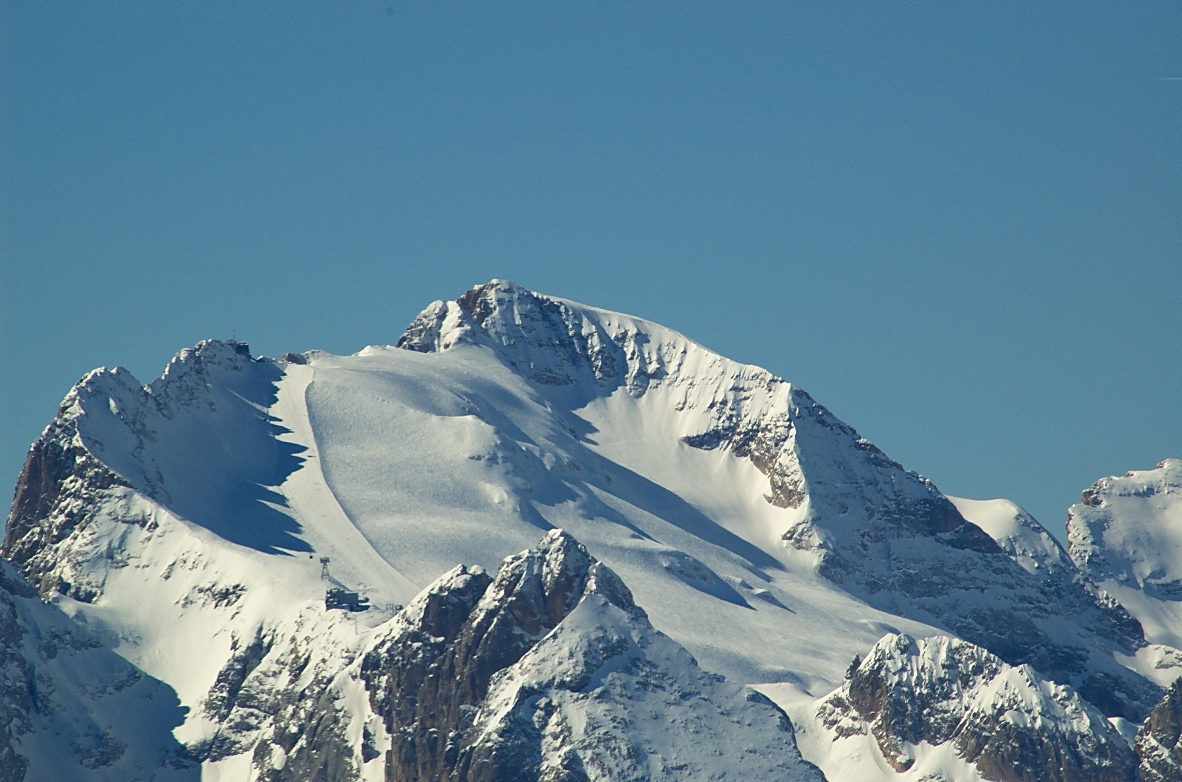
The Marmolada, the highest point in Veneto

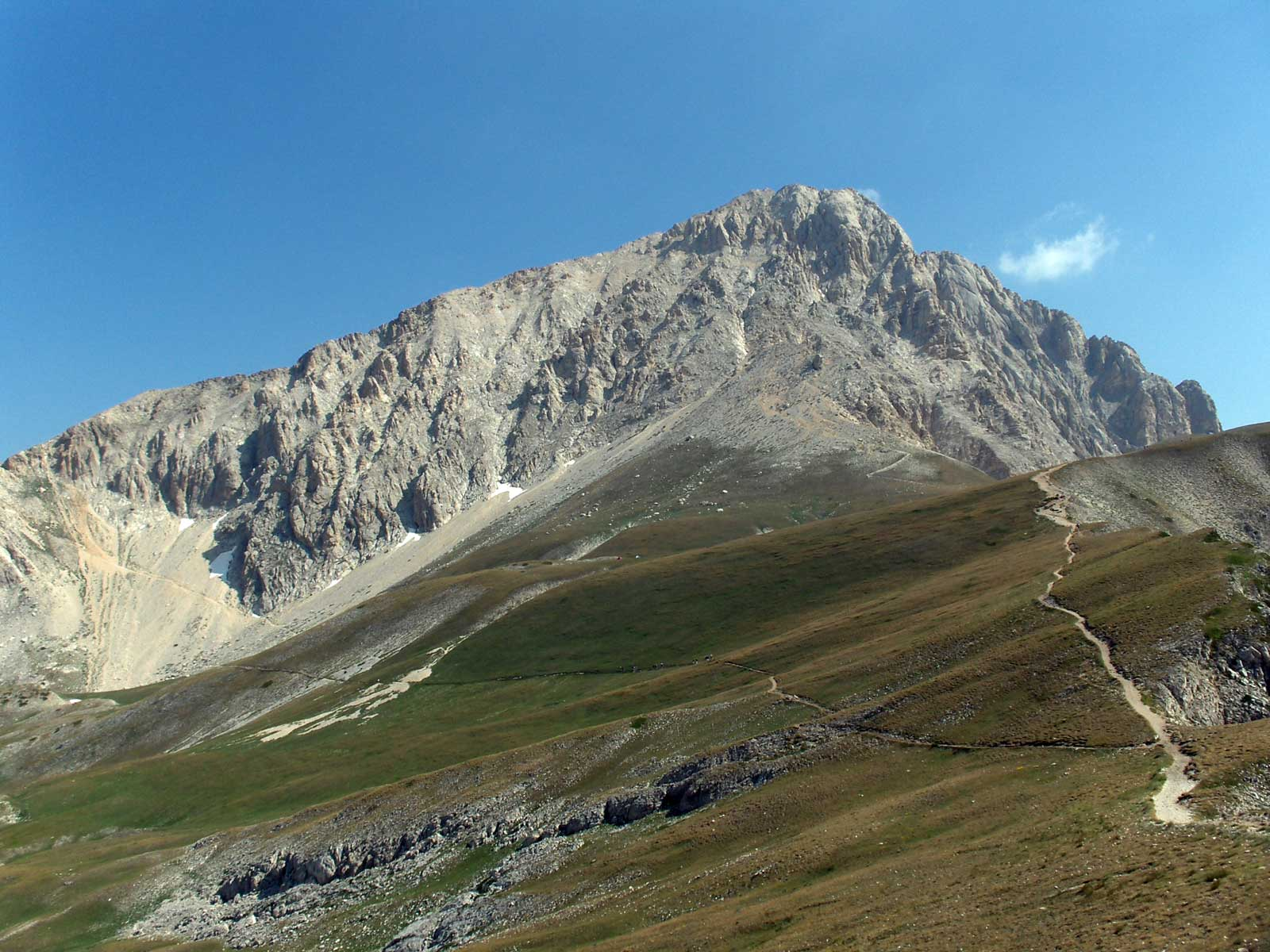
The Corno Grande, the highest point in the Apennines

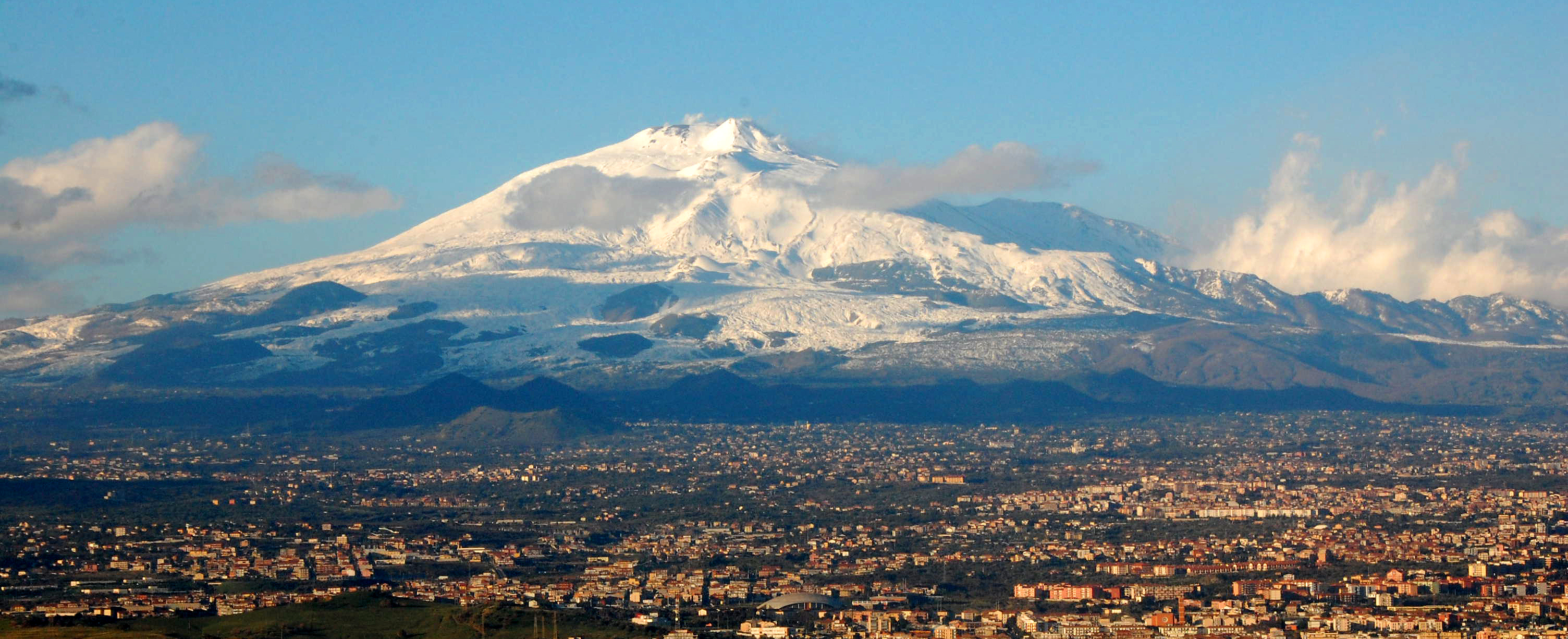
Mount Etna, the highest point in Sicily

Region	Highest point	Province	Elevation
Aosta Valley	Mont Blanc (Note: Since the French Revolution, the issue of the ownership of the summit has been debated. See Mont Blanc § Ownership of the summit.)	n/a	4,810 m
Piedmont	Grenzgipfel (Monte Rosa)	VB	4,618 m
Lombardy	Punta Perrucchetti (Bernina massif)	SO	4,021 m
Trentino-Alto Adige	Ortler	BZ	3,902 m
Sicily	Mount Etna	CT	3,403 m
Veneto	Marmolada (Note: The ownership is contested by Trentino.)	BL	3,342 m
Abruzzo	Corno Grande (Gran Sasso)	AQ, TE	2,912 m
Friuli-Venezia Giulia	Monte Coglians	UD	2,780 m
Marche	Monte Vettore	AP	2,476 m
Lazio	Monte Gorzano	RI	2,458 m
Umbria	Cima del Redentore	PG	2,448 m
Basilicata	Serra Dolcedorme (Pollino)	PZ	2,267 m
Calabria	Serra Dolcedorme (Pollino)	CS	2,267 m
Molise	Monte Meta	IS	2,242 m
Liguria	Monte Saccarello	IM	2,201 m
Emilia-Romagna	Monte Cimone	MO	2,165 m
Tuscany	Monte Prado	LU	2,054 m
Campania	La Gallinola	CE	1,923 m
Sardinia	Punta La Marmora (Gennargentu)	NU, OG	1,834 m
Apulia	Monte Cornacchia	FG	1,152 m

== See also ==
- List of mountains of Italy
- List of volcanoes in Italy
