= Pennino =

Pennino may refer to:

- Edizione-Pennino, a zinfandel wine produced in Napa Valley by Francis Ford Coppola
- Monte Pennino, an approximately 1,570 m high mountain in the Umbria region of Italy
- Adrian Pennino or Paulie Pennino, fictional characters in the Rocky series of movies
- The Pennines or "Pennino Hills", a low-rising mountain range in northern England and southern Scotland
- Anthony Pennino music executive, manager, & songwriter/composer Nephew of Italia Pennino
- Gaetano Enrico Pennino, Italian song composer
