= Pollino =

Mountain in Italy

- Serra Dolcedorme (high point)
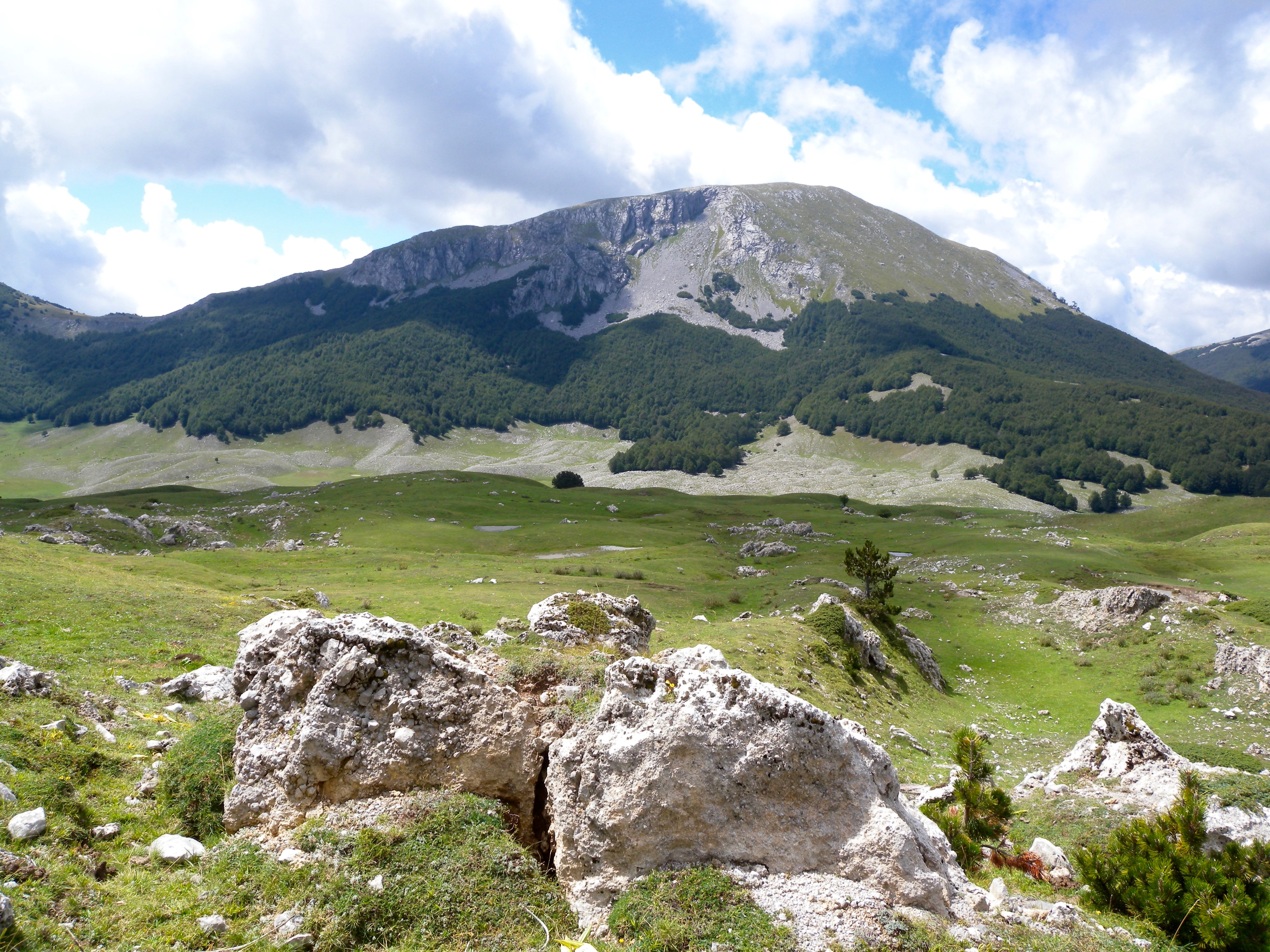
- Northern slopes of Monte Pollino.

Highest point
- Elevation: 2,267 m (7,438 ft) (Serra Dolcedorme)
- Prominence: 1,715 m (5,627 ft)
- Listing: Ultra
- Coordinates: 39°53′41″N 16°13′03″E

Geography
- Location within Italy
- Location: Basilicata and Calabria, Italy
- Parent range: Lucan Apennines

The Pollino (Italian: Massiccio del Pollino) is a massif in the southern Apennines, on the border between Basilicata and Calabria, southern Italy, being the highest point of both regions. It became part of the Pollino National Park in 1992. The main peaks include Monte Pollino (2,248 m) and the massif's high point, Serra Dolcedorme (2,267 m), which overlooks the plain of Sibari.

== Geology ==
Formed from limestone, the Pollino is the highest area in the range, and erosion of the limestone, especially on the Calabrian side, has created numerous grottoes, such as the Romito grottoes, in which Palaeolithic petroglyphs have been found. Canyons have also been carved into the limestone, such as the canyon created by the Raganello stream.

== Wildlife ==
The Pollino is home to a flourishing fauna and flora. Woods dominated by chestnut, beech and the rare Bosnian pine, which is the park's symbol, cover especially the highest peaks; animal species include the Italian wolf, eagle owl, roe deer and the rare golden eagle.

== See also ==
- Calabrian wine
- List of European ultra prominent peaks
- List of Italian regions by highest point
