= Monte Prado =

Mountain in Italy

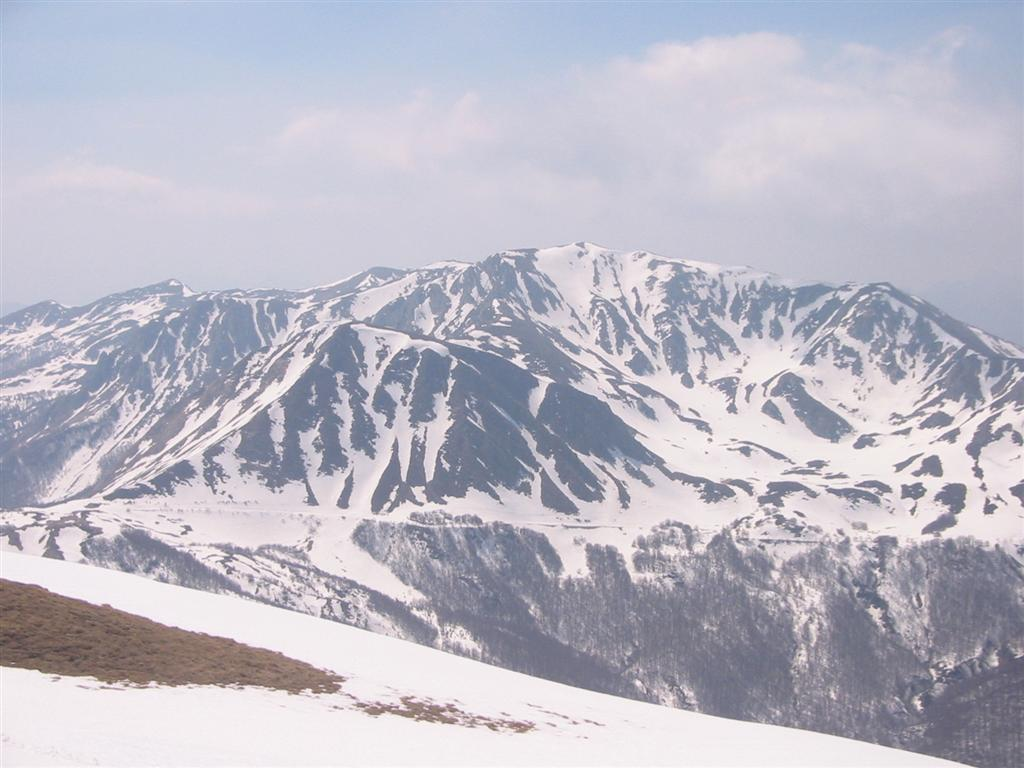

Highest point
- Elevation: 2,054 m (6,739 ft)
- Prominence: 288 m (945 ft)
- Isolation: 3.14 km (1.95 mi)
- Coordinates: 44°15′00″N 10°24′27″E

Geography
- Location within Italy
- Location: Province of Reggio Emilia, province of Lucca, Italy
- Parent range: Tuscan-Emilian Apennines

Monte Prado (or Prato) is a mountain in the northern Apennines, located in the trait between the Pradarena and Radici Passes, with an altitude of 2,054 metres (6,739 ft).

== Geography ==
Monte Prado is right on the boundary between the province of Reggio Emilia and that of Lucca.

== Environment protection ==
The mountain is part of the National Park of the Appennino Tosco-Emiliano.

== See also ==
- List of Italian regions by highest point

== See also ==
- List of Italian regions by highest point
