= Monte Pennino =

Mountain in Italy

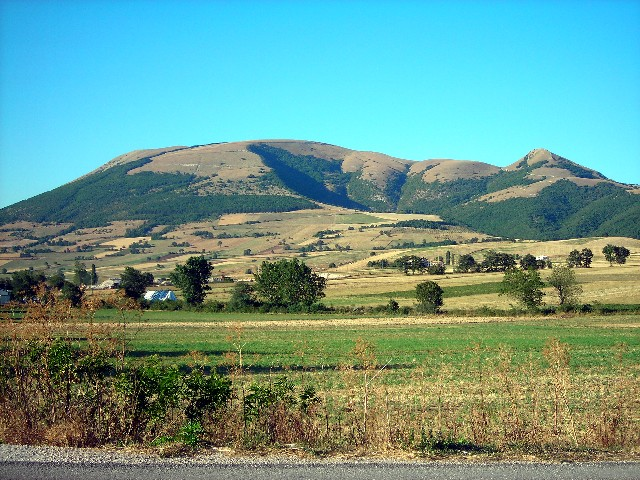
- Monte Pennino

Highest point
- Elevation: 1,571 m (5,154 ft)
- Isolation: 29 km (18 mi)
- Coordinates: 43°06′N 12°53′E

Geography
- Location within Italy
- Location: on the border between the provinces of Macerata and the Perugia
- Parent range: Appennino Umbro-Marchigiano

Monte Pennino is a mountain in the Appennino Umbro-Marchigiano range in Italy. The mountain is on the border between the province of Macerata in the Marche region of Italy and the province of Perugia in the Umbria region of Italy. The elevation of the mountain is 1,571 metres (5,154 ft).
