= Apennine Mountains =

Mountain ranges stretching the length of Italy

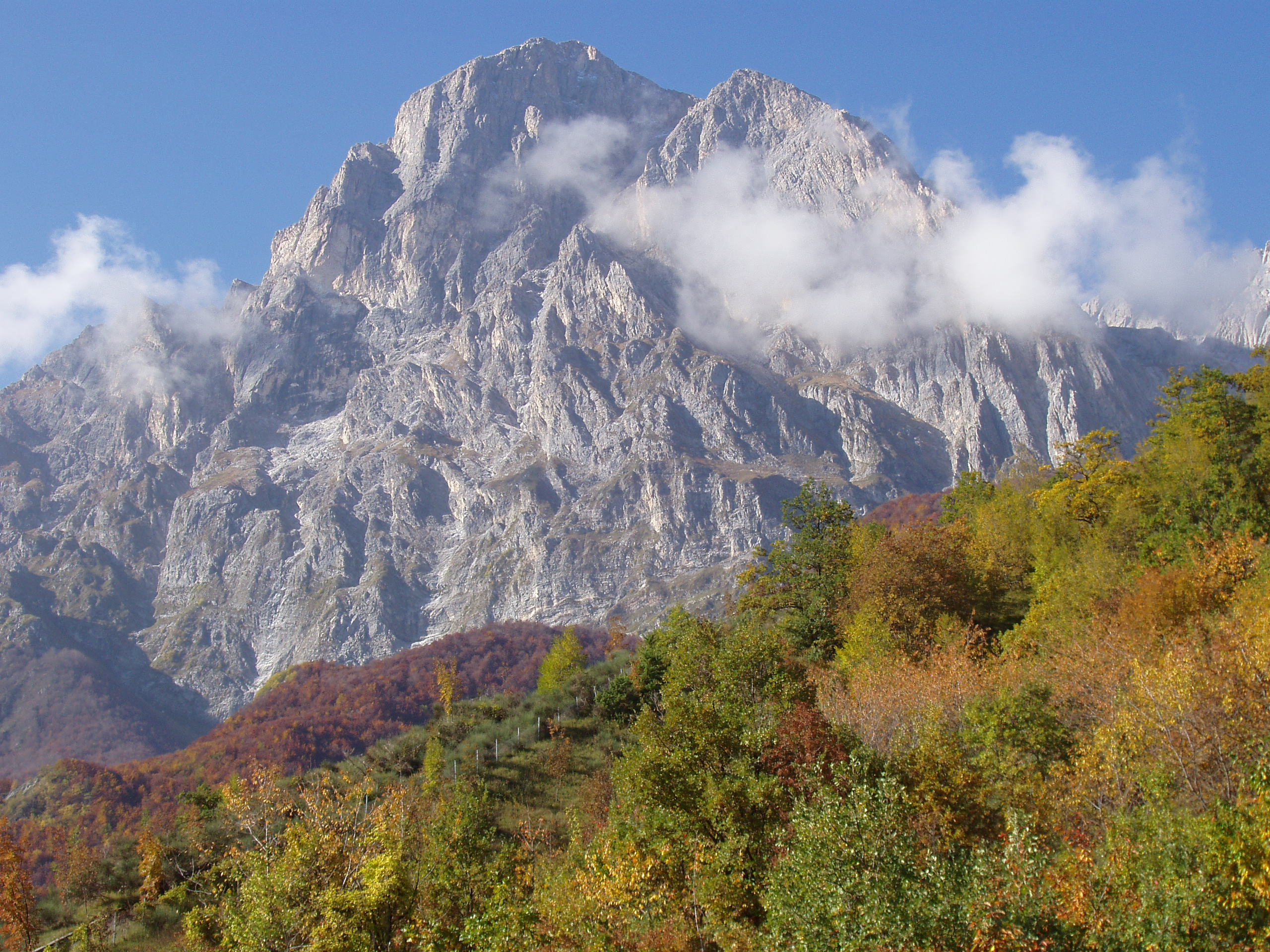
- Corno Grande in Gran Sasso e Monti della Laga National Park, Abruzzo

Highest point
- Peak: Corno Grande (Great Horn)
- Elevation: 2,912 m (9,554 ft)
- Listing: List of mountain ranges
- Coordinates: 42°28′9″N 13°33′56″E

Dimensions
- Length: 1,200 km (750 mi) northwest to southeast
- Width: 250 km (160 mi) southwest to northeast

Naming
- Native name: Monti Appennini (Italian)

Geography
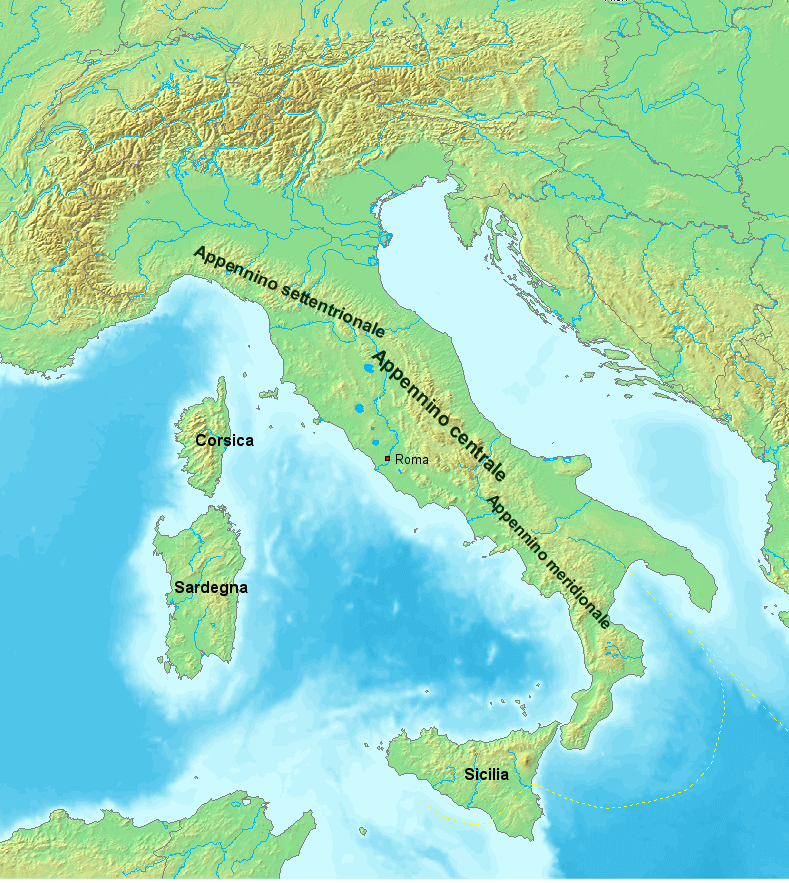
- Relief map of the Apennines
- Countries: Italy; San Marino

Geology
- Rock age(s): Mesozoic for formation of rock, Neogene-Quaternary for orogeny
- Rock type(s): Apennine fold and thrust belt

The Apennines or Apennine Mountains (/ˈæpənaɪn/ AP-ə-nyne; Italian: Appennini [appenˈniːni]) (Note: Latin Apenninus (Greek Ἀπέννινος or Ἀπέννινα) has the form of an adjective, which would be segmented Apenn-inus, often used with nouns such as mons ("mountain") or Greek ὄρος (óros), but Apenninus is just as often used alone as a noun. The ancient Greeks and Romans typically but not always used "mountain" in the singular to mean one or a range; thus, "the Apennine mountain" refers to the entire chain and is translated "the Apennine mountains". The ending can vary also by gender depending on the noun modified. The Italian singular refers to one of the constituent chains rather than to a single mountain, and the Italian plural refers to multiple chains rather than to multiple mountains.) are a mountain range consisting of parallel smaller chains extending c. 1,200 km (750 mi) the length of peninsular Italy. In the northwest they join the Ligurian Alps at Altare. In the southwest they end at Reggio di Calabria, the coastal city at the tip of the peninsula. Since 2000 the Environment Ministry of Italy, following the recommendations of the Apennines Park of Europe Project, has defined the Apennines System to include the mountains of north Sicily, a total distance of 1,500 kilometres (930 mi). The system forms an arc enclosing the east of the Ligurian and Tyrrhenian seas.

The Apennines preserve some relatively intact ecosystems that have survived human intervention. These include some of the best-preserved forests and montane grasslands in Europe, now protected by national parks and, within them, a high diversity of flora and fauna. The mountains also support a high diversity of flora and fauna and are among the few places in Europe where large predators such as the Italian wolf and the Marsican brown bear still exist, They are now extinct in the rest of Central Europe.

The mountains lend their name to the Apennine Peninsula that forms the major part of Italy. They are mostly verdant, although one side of the highest peak, Corno Grande, is partially covered by Calderone glacier, the only glacier in the Apennines. The eastern slopes down to the Adriatic Sea are steep, whilst the western slopes form foothills on which most of the towns of peninsular Italy are located. The mountains tend to be named after the province or provinces in which they are located; for example the Ligurian Apennines are in Liguria.

== Etymology ==
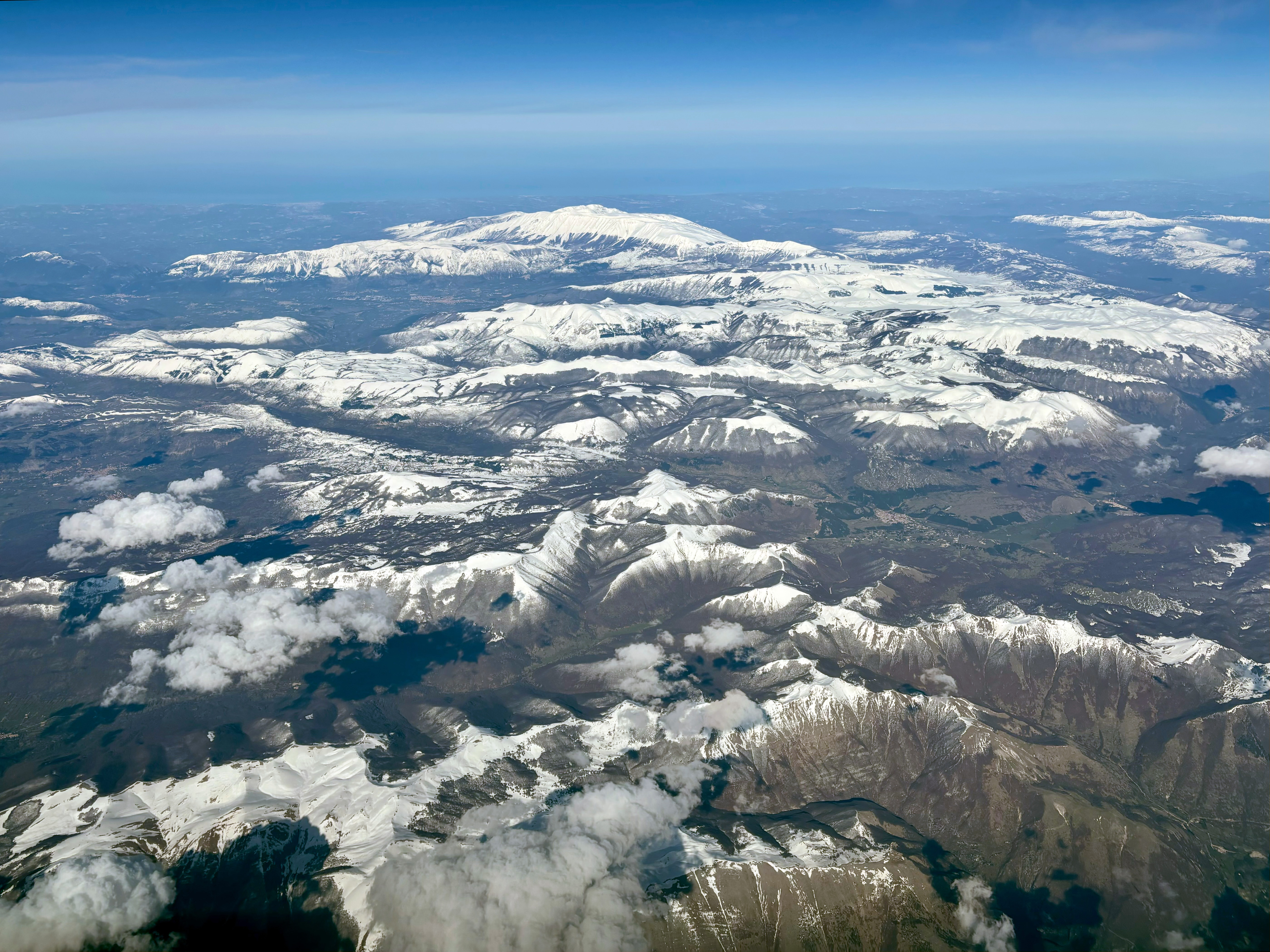
Aerial view of Apennine Mountains

The etymology most frequently repeated, because of its semantic appropriateness, is that it derives from the Celtic penn, 'mountain', 'summit': A-penn-inus, which could have been assigned during the Celtic domination of north Italy in the 4th century BC or before. The name originally applied to the north Apennines. However, historical linguists have never found a derivation with which they all agree. Wilhelm Deecke said: "[…] its etymology is doubtful but some derive it from the Ligurian-Celtish Pen or Ben, which means mountain peak."

A large number of place names seem to reflect pen: Penarrig, Penbrynn, Pencoid, Penmon, Pentir, etc. or ben: Beanach, Benmore, Benabuird, Benan, Bencruachan, etc. In one derivation Pen/Ben is cognate with Old Irish cenn, 'head', but an original *kwen- would be required, which is typologically not found in languages that feature labio-velars. Windisch and Brugmann reconstructed Indo-European *kwi-, deriving also the Greek Pindus Mountains from the same root, but *kwen- < *kwi- is not explained by any rule. By some, English pin, as well as pen and Latin pinna or penna, 'feather' (in the sense of the horn of the quill), have been connected to the name. This view has the word originating in Latium inconsistently with the theory of the northern origin. None of these derivations is accepted unquestionably.

== History ==
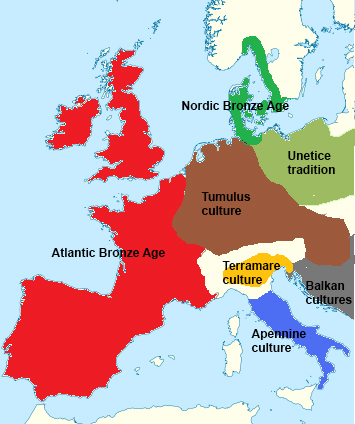
Western Europe during the Middle Bronze Age: the Apennine culture is in blue.

The Apennine culture is a technology complex in central and southern Italy from the Italian Middle Bronze Age (15th–14th centuries BC). In the mid-20th century the Apennine was divided into Proto-, Early, Middle and Late sub-phases, but now archaeologists prefer to consider as "Apennine" only the ornamental pottery style of the later phase of the Middle Bronze Age (BM3).

This phase is preceded by the Grotta Nuova facies (central Italy) and by the Protoapennine B facies (southern Italy) and succeeded by the Subapennine facies of 13th-century ("Bronzo Recente"). Apennine pottery is a burnished ware incised with spirals, meanders and geometrical zones, filled with dots or transverse dashes. It has been found on Ischia island in association with LHII and LHIII pottery and on Lipari in association with LHIIIA pottery, which associations date it to the Late Bronze Age as it is defined in Greece and the Aegean.

The people of the Apennine culture were alpine cattle herdsmen grazing their animals over the meadows and groves of mountainous central Italy. They lived in small hamlets located in defensible places. On the move between summer pastures they built temporary camps or lived in caves and rock shelters. Their range was not necessarily confined to the hills; their pottery has been found on the Capitoline Hill in Rome as well as on the islands mentioned above.

== Geography ==
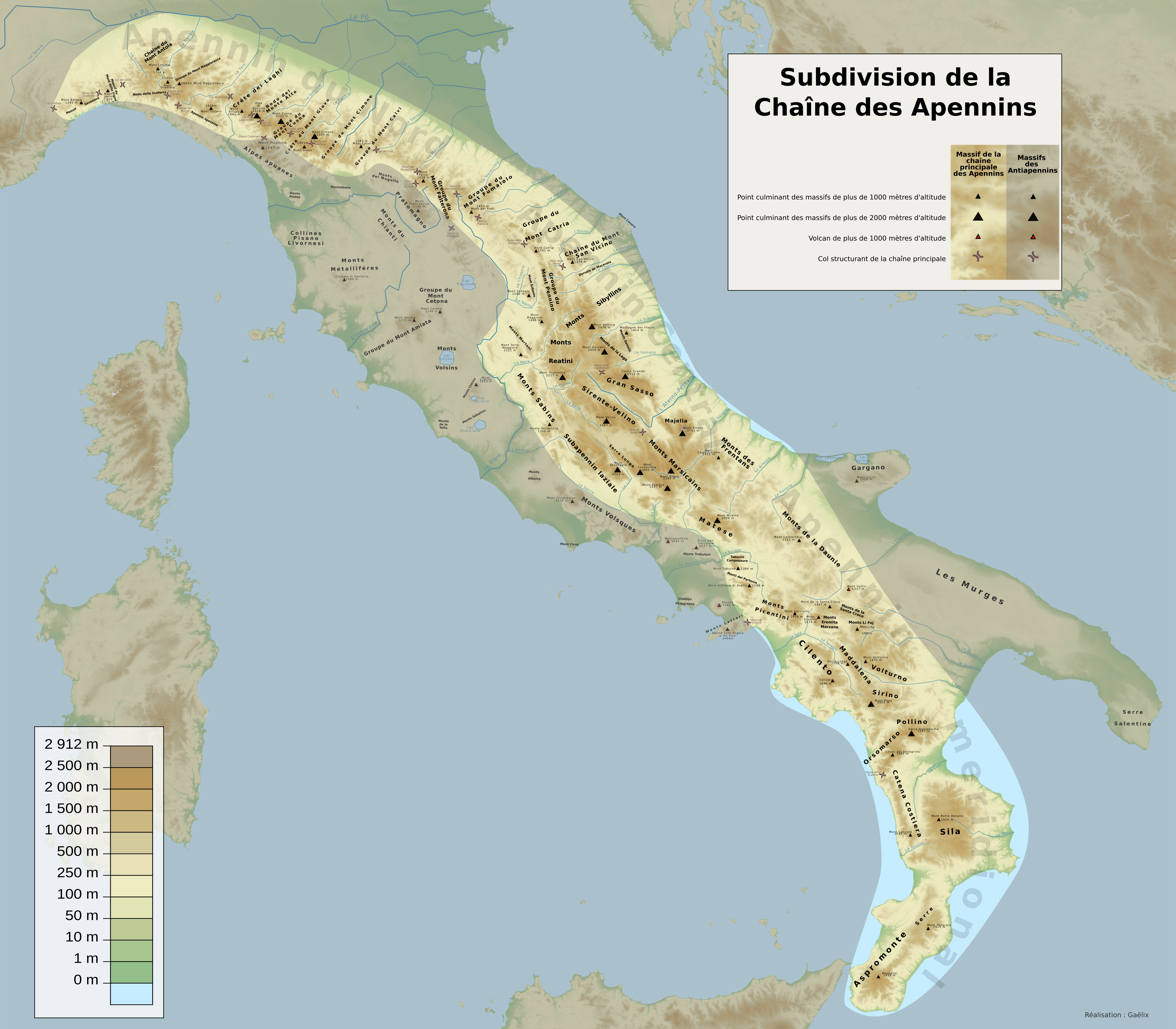
Orographic and hydrographic map of the Apennines

The Apennines are divided into three sectors: northern (Appennino settentrionale), central (Appennino centrale), and southern (Appennino meridionale).

A number of long hiking trails wind through the Apennines. Of note is European walking route E1 coming from northern Europe and traversing the lengths of the northern and central Apennines. The Grand Italian Trail begins in Trieste and after winding through the Alpine arc traverses the entire Apennine system, Sicily and Sardinia.

=== Northern Apennines ===
The northern Apennines consist of three subchains: the Ligurian (Appennino ligure), Tuscan–Emilian (Appennino tosco-emiliano), and Umbrian Apennines (Appennino umbro).

==== Ligurian Apennines ====
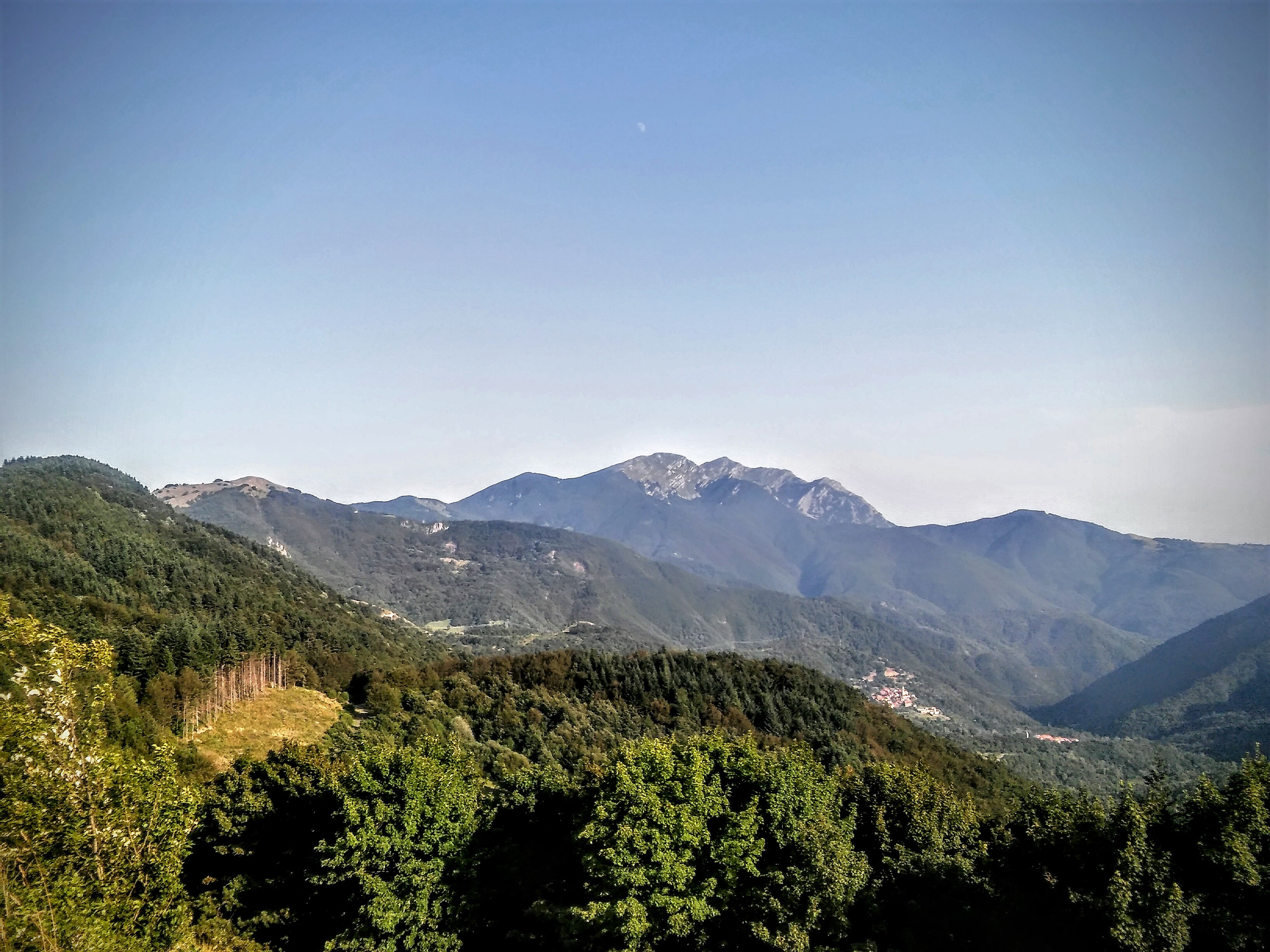
La Cisa pass

The Ligurian Apennines border the Ligurian Sea in the Gulf of Genoa, from about Savona below the upper Bormida River valley to about La Spezia (La Cisa pass) below the upper Magra River valley. The range follows the Gulf of Genoa separating it from the upper Po Valley. The northwestern border follows the line of the Bormida River to Acqui Terme. There the river continues northeast to Alessandria in the Po Valley, but the mountains bend away to the southeast.

The upper Bormida can be reached by a number of roads proceeding inland at a right angle to the coast southwest of Savona, the chief one being the Autostrada Torino-Savona. They ascend to the Bocchetta di Altare, sometimes called Colle di Cadibona, 436 m (1,430 ft), the border between the Ligurian Alps along the coast to the west and the Ligurian Apennines. A bronze plaque fixed to a stone marks the top of the pass. In the vicinity are fragments of the old road and three ruins of former fortifications.

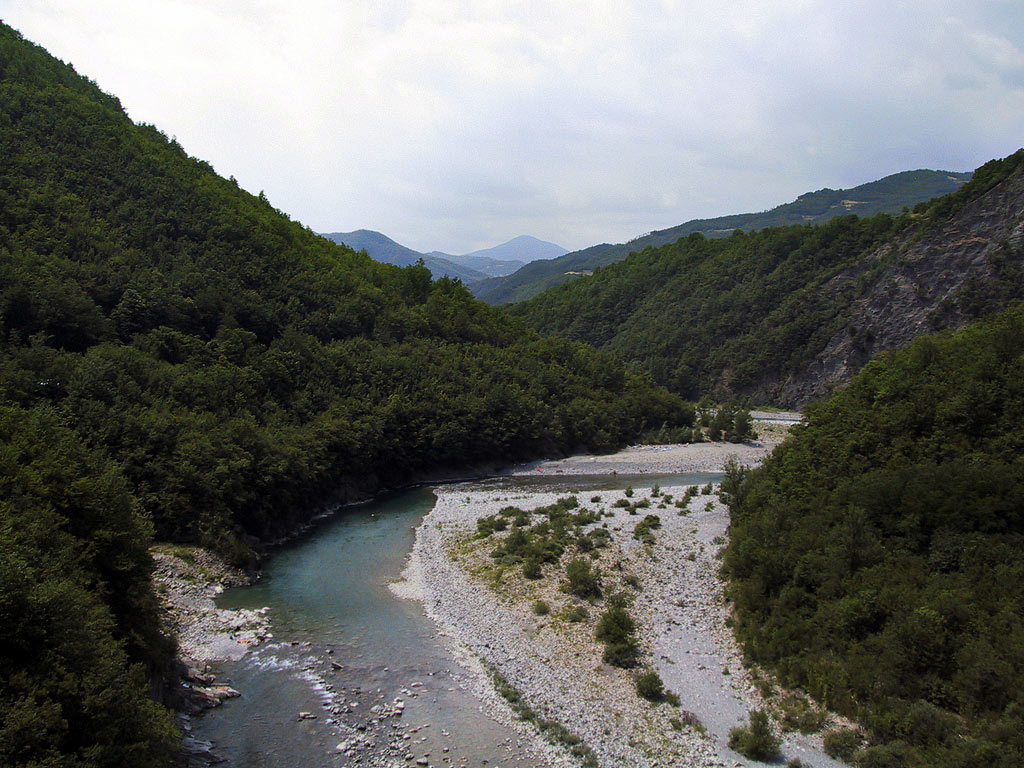
Trebbia river

At Carcare, the main roads connect with the upper Bormida valley (Bormida di Mallare) before turning west. The Scrivia, the Trebbia and the Taro, tributaries of the Po River, drain the northeast slopes. The range contains dozens of peaks. Toward the southern end the Aveto Natural Regional Park includes Monte Penna. Nearby is the highest point of Ligurian Apennines, Monte Maggiorasca at 1,800 m (5,900 ft).

The main and only feasible overland route connecting the coastal plain of Liguria to the north Italian plain runs through Bocchetta di Altare. It has always been of strategic importance. Defenders of north Italy have had to control it since ancient times, as the various fortifications placed there testify. Trenitalia, the state railway system, highly developed on the coastal plain, now traverses the mountains routinely through a number of railway tunnels, such as the one at Giovi Pass.

The southeastern border of the Ligurian Apennines is the Fiume Magra, which projects into the Tyrrhenian Sea south of La Spezia, and the Fiume Taro, which runs in the opposite direction to join the Po. The divide between the two upper river valleys is the Cisa Pass. Under it (in two tunnels) runs the Autostrada della Cisa between Spezia and Parma.

==== Tuscan–Emilian Apennines ====
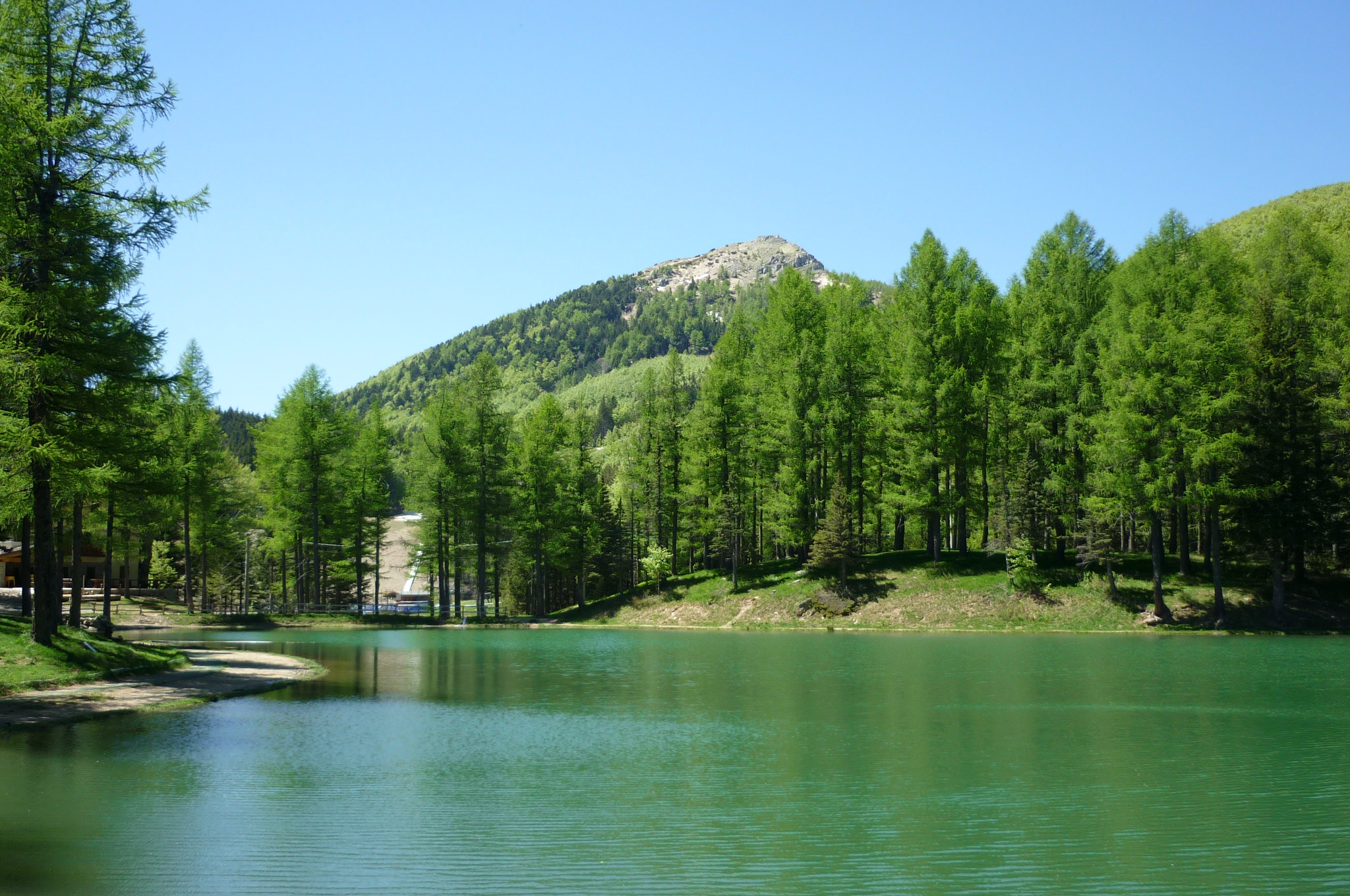
Monte Cimone (2,165 m or 7,103 ft), in Emilia-Romagna, is the highest mountain of the northern Apennines.

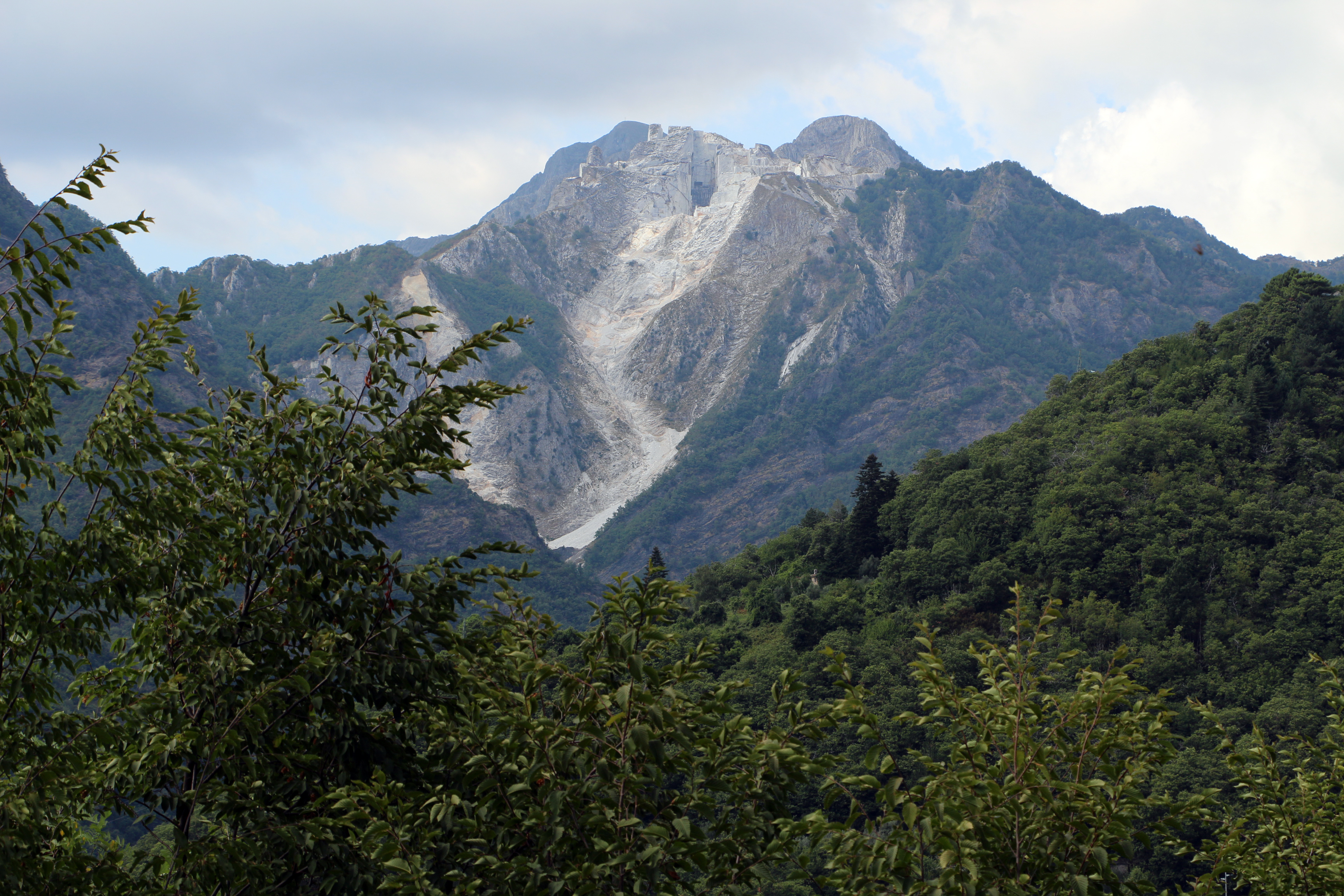
Apuan Alps

Starting at Cisa Pass, the mountain chain turns further to the southeast, to cross the peninsula along the border between the Emilia-Romagna and Tuscany regions. They are named the Tuscan–Emilian Apennines west of the Futa Pass and the Tuscan–Romagnol Apennines east of it, or just the Tuscan Apennines. They extend to the upper Tiber River. The highest point is Monte Cimone at 2,165 m (7,103 ft).

A separate branch, the Apuan Alps, goes southwest, bordering the coast south of La Spezia. Whether they are to be considered part of the Apennines is a matter of opinion; certainly, they are part of the Apennine System. Topographically only the valley of the River Serchio, which running parallel to the coast turns and exits into the Tyrrhenian Sea north of Pisa, separates the Apuan Alps from the Apennines; geologically the rock is of a slightly different composition, marble. The Roman marble industry was centered at Luna, and is now active in Carrara.

As the Tuscan Apennines divide the peninsula between the Po Valley and the plains and hills of Tuscany and Lazio, transportation over them has been used to achieve political and economic unity. Historically the Romans used the Via Flaminia between Rome and Rimini. The montane distance between Florence in Tuscany and Bologna in Emilia-Romagna is shorter, but exploitation of it required the conquest of more rugged terrain, which was not feasible for the ancients. Railway lines were constructed over the mountains in the early 19th century but they were of low capacity and unimprovable.

Since 1856, a series of tunnels have been constructed to conduct "the Bologna-Florence rail line", which is neither a single line nor a single tunnel. The Porrettana Line went into service in 1864, the Direttissima in 1934 and the High Speed in 1996. A few dozen tunnels support the three of them, the longest on the High-Speed Line being the Voglia Tunnel at 16.757 km (10.412 mi). The longest is on the Direttissima, the Great Apennine Tunnel, which at 18.5 kilometres (11.5 miles) is the longest entirely within Italy, although the Simplon Tunnel, which connects Italy and Switzerland, is longer. (Note: Claims of being the longest or second-longest in the world have been soon outdated. See List of longest tunnels.) Automobile traffic is carried by the Autostrada del Sole, Route A1, which goes through numerous shorter tunnels, bypassing an old road, originally Roman, through Futa Pass. In December 2015, a new Route A1 called Variante di Valico was opened after many years of construction consisting of major tunnels (the longest being the new 8.6-kilometre (5.3-mile) 'Tunel Base') and new overpasses, shortening the traveling time between Florence and Bologna by road. The Foreste Casentinesi, Monte Falterona, Campigna National Park is in the southern part of the Tuscan–Romagnol Apennines. The southern limit of the Tuscan–Romagnol Apennines is the Bocca Serriola Pass in northern Umbria, which links Fano and Città di Castello.

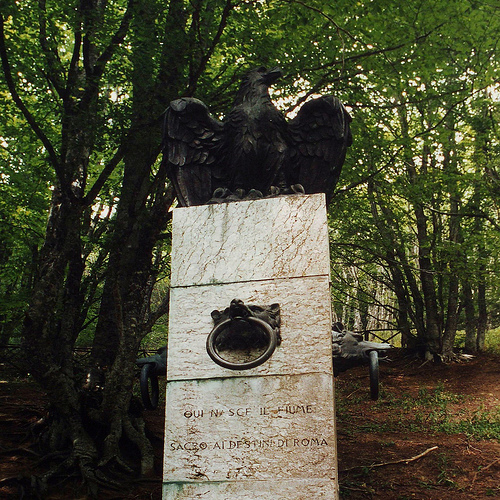
Source of the Tiber river at Mount Fumaiolo, marked by a column with an eagle and wolves, part of the Apennine fauna and symbols of Rome. The inscription reads: "Here the river sacred to the destinies of Rome is born."

The Tiber River at Rome flows from Monte Fumaiolo in the Tuscan–Romagnol Apennine from northeast to southwest, projecting into the Tyrrhenian Sea at right angles to the shore. The upper Tiber, however, flows from northwest to southeast, gradually turning through one right angle clockwise. The northern Tiber Valley is deep and separates the Apennines on the left bank from a lesser range, the Tuscan Anti-Apennines (Sub-Apennines) on its right.

=== Central Apennines ===
The Apennine System forms an irregular arc with centers of curvature located in the Tyrrhenian Sea. The northern and southern segments comprise parallel chains that can be viewed as single overall mountain ridges, such as the Ligurian Mountains. The center, being thicker and more complex, is geologically divided into an inner and an outer arc with regard to the centers of curvature. The geologic definition, however, is not the same as the geographic.

Based on rock type and orogenic incidents, the northern segment of the arc is divided into the Outer Northern Apennines (ONA) and the Inner Northern Apennines (INA). The Central Apennines are divided into the Umbrian–Marchean (Appennino umbro-marchigiano) or Roman Apennines in the north and the Abruzzi Apennines (Appennino abruzzese) in the south. It extends from Bocca Serriola pass in the north to Forlì pass in the south.

==== Umbria-Marche Apennines ====
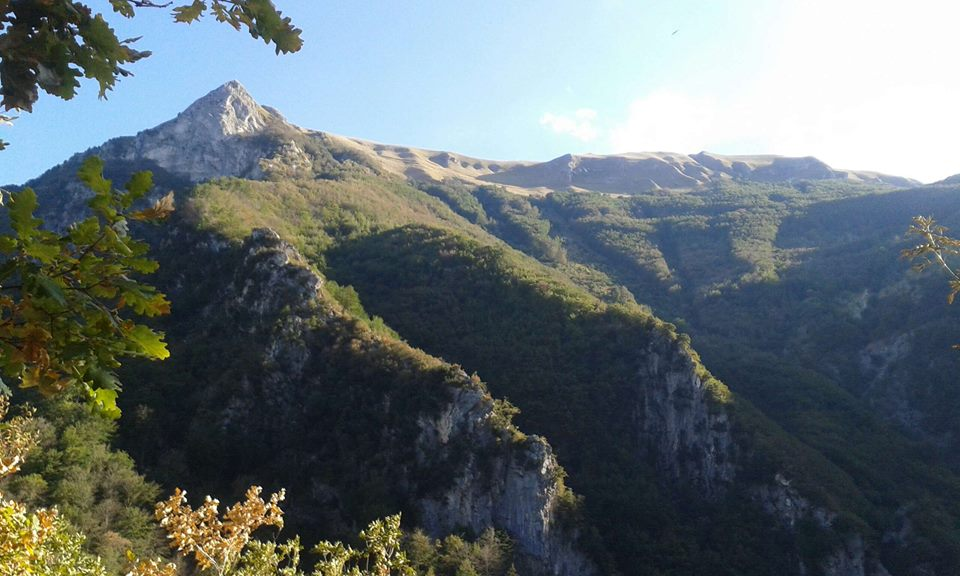
Sibillini Mountains

The west border of the Umbria-Marche Apennines (or Appennino umbro-marchigiano)) runs through Cagli. They extend south to the Tronto River, the south border of the ONA. The highest peak, Monte Vettore, at 2,478 m (8,130 ft), is part of the Monti Sibillini, incorporated into Parco Nazionale dei Monti Sibillini. Further north is the parco naturale regionale della Gola della Rossa e di Frasassi, in which are the Gola della Rossa ("Red Gorge") and Frasassi Caves. Still further north is Parco Sasso Simone e Simoncello. The Italian Park Service calls it the "green heart" of Italy. The region is heavily forested, such as the Riserva Naturale Statale Gola del Furlo, where Furlo Pass on the Via Flaminia is located. Both the Etruscans and the Romans constructed tunnels here.

==== Abruzzi Apennines ====
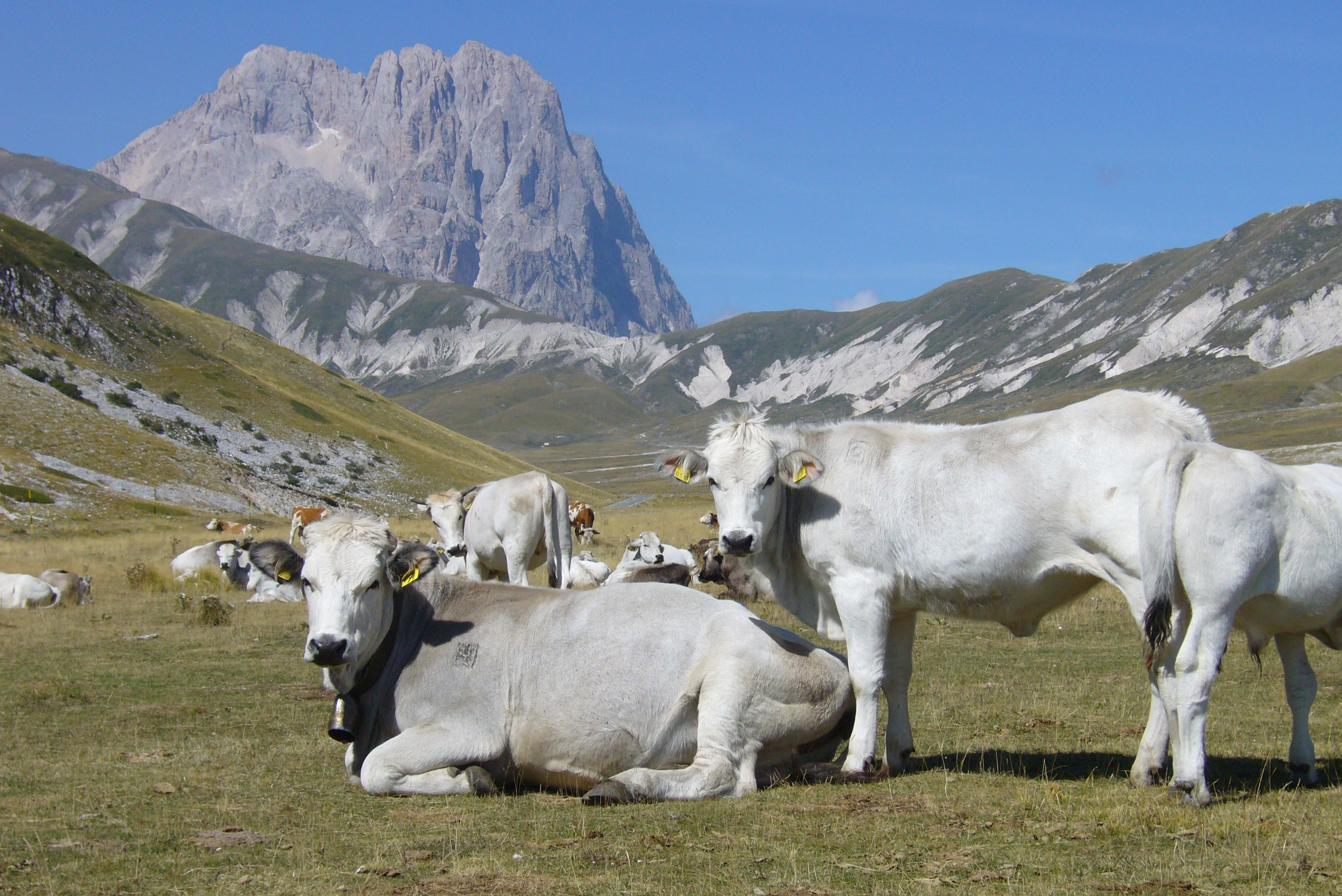
Gran Sasso mountain and Campo Imperatore plateau

The Abruzzi Apennines, located in Abruzzo, Molise and southeastern Lazio, contain the highest peaks and most rugged terrain of the Apennines. They are known in history as the territory of the Italic peoples first defeated by the city of Rome. Coincidentally they exist in three parallel folds or chains surviving from the orogeny. These extend in a northwest–southeast direction from the River Tronto to the River Sangro, which drain into the Adriatic. The coastal hills of the east extend between San Benedetto del Tronto in the north and Torino di Sangro in the south.

The eastern chain consists mainly of the southern part of the Monti Sibillini, the Monti della Laga, the Gran Sasso d'Italia Massif and the Majella Massif. Among them are two national parks: Gran Sasso e Monti della Laga National Park and Majella National Park; and the Regional Park of the Monti Simbruini. Gran Sasso contains Corno Grande, the highest peak of the Apennines (2912 m).

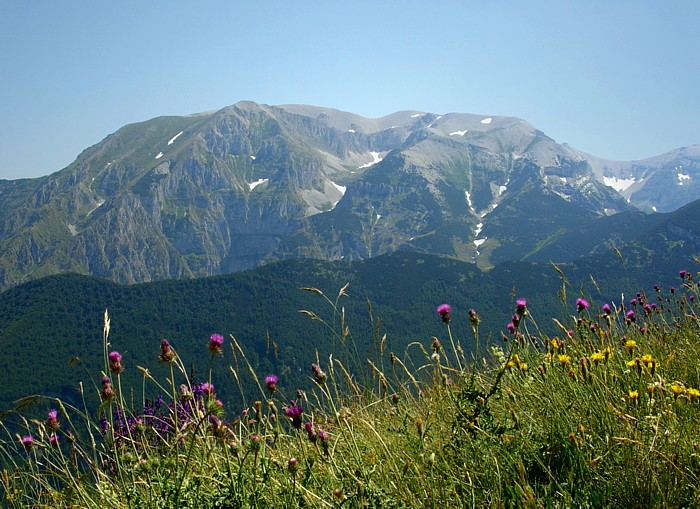
Majella massif

Other features between the western and central ranges are the plain of Rieti, the valley of the Salto, and the Lago Fucino; while between the central and eastern ranges are the valleys of Aquila and Sulmona. The chief rivers on the west are the Nera, with its tributaries the Velino and Salto, and the Aniene, both of which fall into the Tiber. On the east there is at first a succession of small rivers which flow into the Adriatic, from which the highest points of the chain are some 20 km distant, such as the Tronto, Tordino, Vomano and others. The Pescara, which receives the Aterno from the north-west and the Gizio from the south-east, is more important; and so is the Sangro.

The central Apennines are crossed by the railway from Rome to Pescara via Avezzano and Sulmona: the railway from Orte to Terni (and thence to Foligno) follows the Nera valley; while from Terni a line ascends to the plain of Rieti, and thence crosses the central chain to Aquila, whence it follows the valley of the Aterno to Sulmona. In ancient times the Via Salaria, Via Caecilia and Via Tiburtina all ran from Rome to the Adriatic coast. The volcanic mountains of the province of Rome are separated from the Apennines by the Tiber valley, and the Monti Lepini, part of the Volscian chain, by the valleys of the Sacco and Liri.

=== Southern Apennines ===
==== Samnite and Campanian Apennines ====
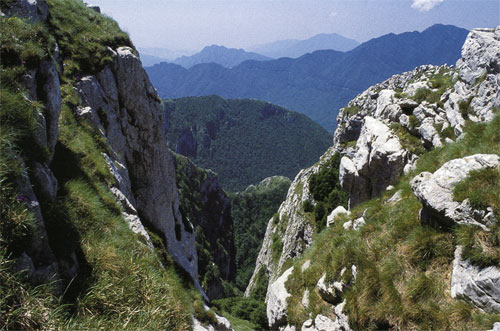
The Monti Picentini, in the Campanian Apennines

In the southern Apennines, to the south of the Sangro valley, the three parallel chains are broken up into smaller groups; among them may be named the Matese, the highest point of which is the Monte Miletto 2,050 metres (6,725 ft). The chief rivers on the south-west are the Liri or Garigliano with its tributary the Sacco, the Volturno, Sebeto, Sarno, on the north the Trigno, Biferno and Fortore.

Daunian mountains, in Apulia, are connected with the Apennine range, and so are Cilento mounts on the west. On the converse the promontory of Mount Gargano, on the east, is completely isolated, and so are the Campanian volcanic arc near Naples. The district is traversed from north-west to south-east by the railway from Sulmona to Benevento and on to Avellino, and from south-west to northeast by the railways from Caianello via Isernia to Campobasso and Termoli, from Caserta to Benevento and Foggia, and from Nocera Inferiore and Avellino to Rocchetta Sant'Antonio, the junction for Foggia, Spinazzola (for Barletta, Bari, and Taranto) and Potenza. Roman roads followed the same lines as the railways: the Via Appia ran from Capua to Benevento, whence the older road went to Venosa and Taranto and so to Brindisi, while the Via Traiana ran nearly to Troia (near Foggia) and thence to Bari.

==== Lucan Apennines ====
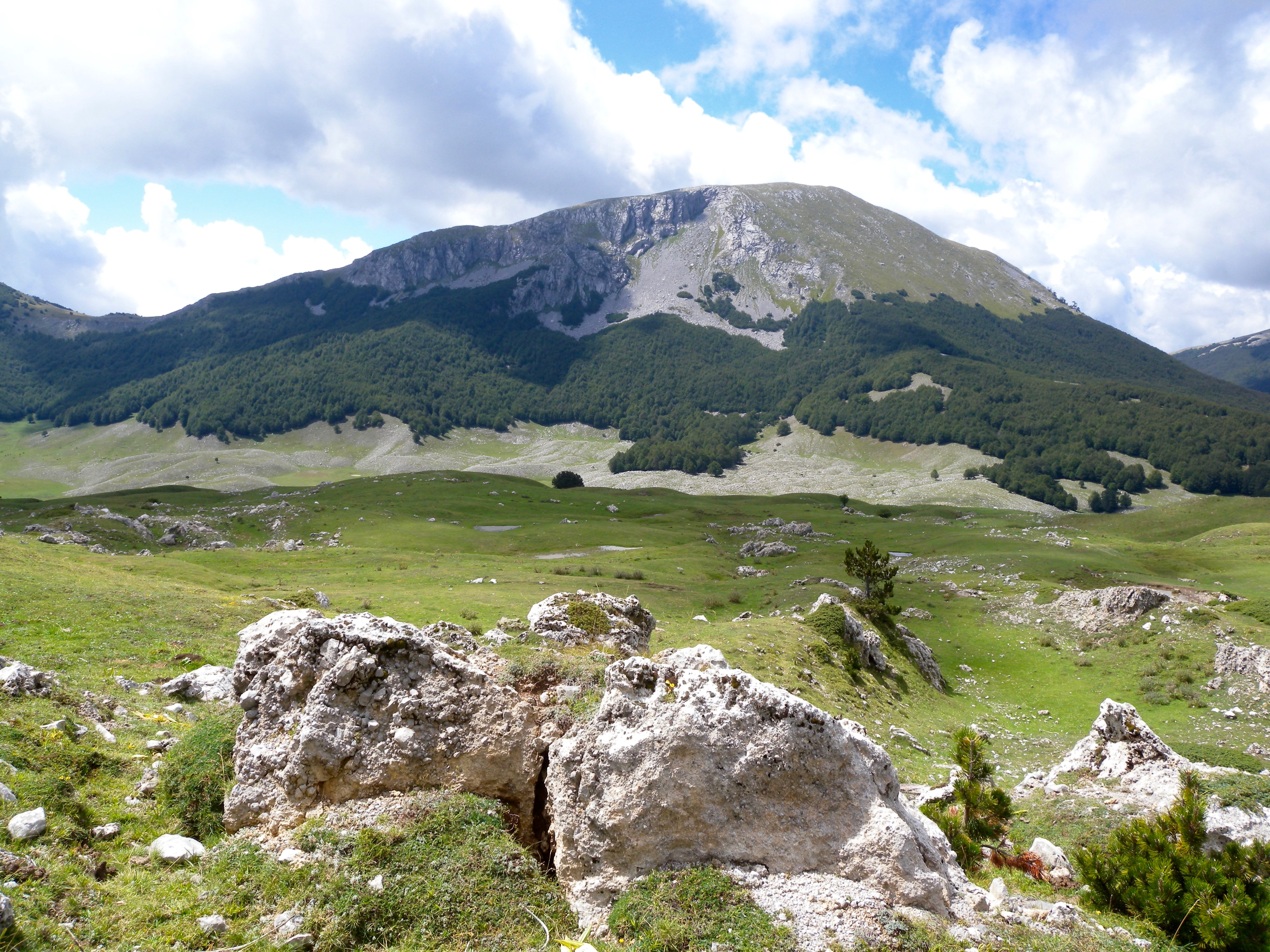
Pollino massif

The valley of the Ofanto, which runs into the Adriatic close to Barletta, marks the northern termination of the first range of the Lucanian Apennines (now Basilicata), which runs from east to west, while south of the valleys of the Sele (on the west) and Basento (on the east)—which form the line followed by the railway from Battipaglia via Potenza to Metaponto—the second range begins to run due north and south as far as the plain of Sibari. The highest point is the Monte Pollino 2,233 metres (7,325 ft). The chief rivers are the Sele—joined by the Negro and Calore—on the west, and the Bradano, Basento, Agri, Sinni on the east, which flow into the gulf of Taranto; to the south of the last-named river there are only unimportant streams flowing into the sea east and west, inasmuch as here the width of the peninsula diminishes to some 64 kilometres (40 mi). The Cilento mountain range is the western part of the Lucan Appennines, as the Alburni and Eremita-Marzano mounts, part of the province of Salerno; Mount Cervati (1899 m) is the highest of this area.

==== Calabrian and Sicilian Apennines ====
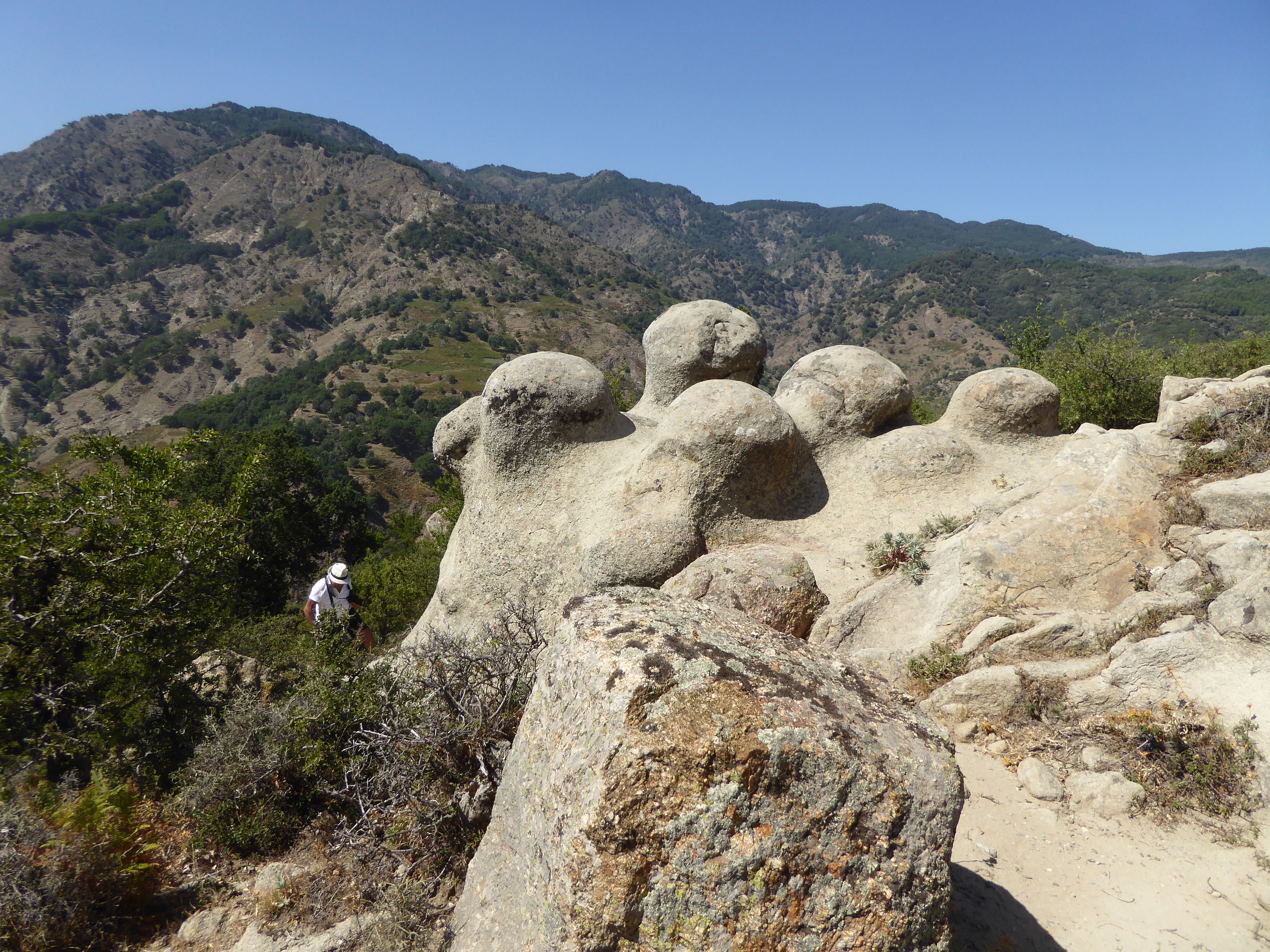
Aspromonte

The railway running south from Sicignano to Lagonegro, ascending the valley of the Negro, is planned to extend to Cosenza, along the line followed by the ancient Via Popilia, which beyond Cosenza reached the west coast at Terina and thence followed it to Reggio. The Via Herculia, a branch of the Via Traiana, ran from Aequum Tuticum to the ancient Nerulum. At the narrowest point the plain of Sibari, through which the rivers Coscile and Crati flow to the sea, occurs on the east coast, extending halfway across the peninsula. Here the limestone Apennines proper cease and the granite mountains of Calabria begin.

The first group extends as far as the isthmus formed by the gulfs of South Eufemia and Squillace; it is known as the Sila, and the highest point reached is 1,930 metres (6,330 ft) (the Botte Donato). The forests which covered it in ancient times supplied the Greeks and Sicilians with timber for shipbuilding. The railway from South Eufemia to Catanzaro and Catanzaro Marina crosses the isthmus, and an ancient road may have run from Squillace to Monteleone. The second group extends to the south end of the Italian Peninsula, culminating in the Aspromonte (1,960 metres (6,420 ft)) to the east of Reggio di Calabria. In both groups the rivers are quite unimportant. Finally, the Calabrian southern Apennine Mountains extend along the northern coast of Sicily (the Sicilian Apennines, Italian Appennino siculo)—Pizzo Carbonara (6,493 feet (1,979 m)) being the highest peak.

== Environment ==
=== Vegetative zones ===
==== Ecoregions ====
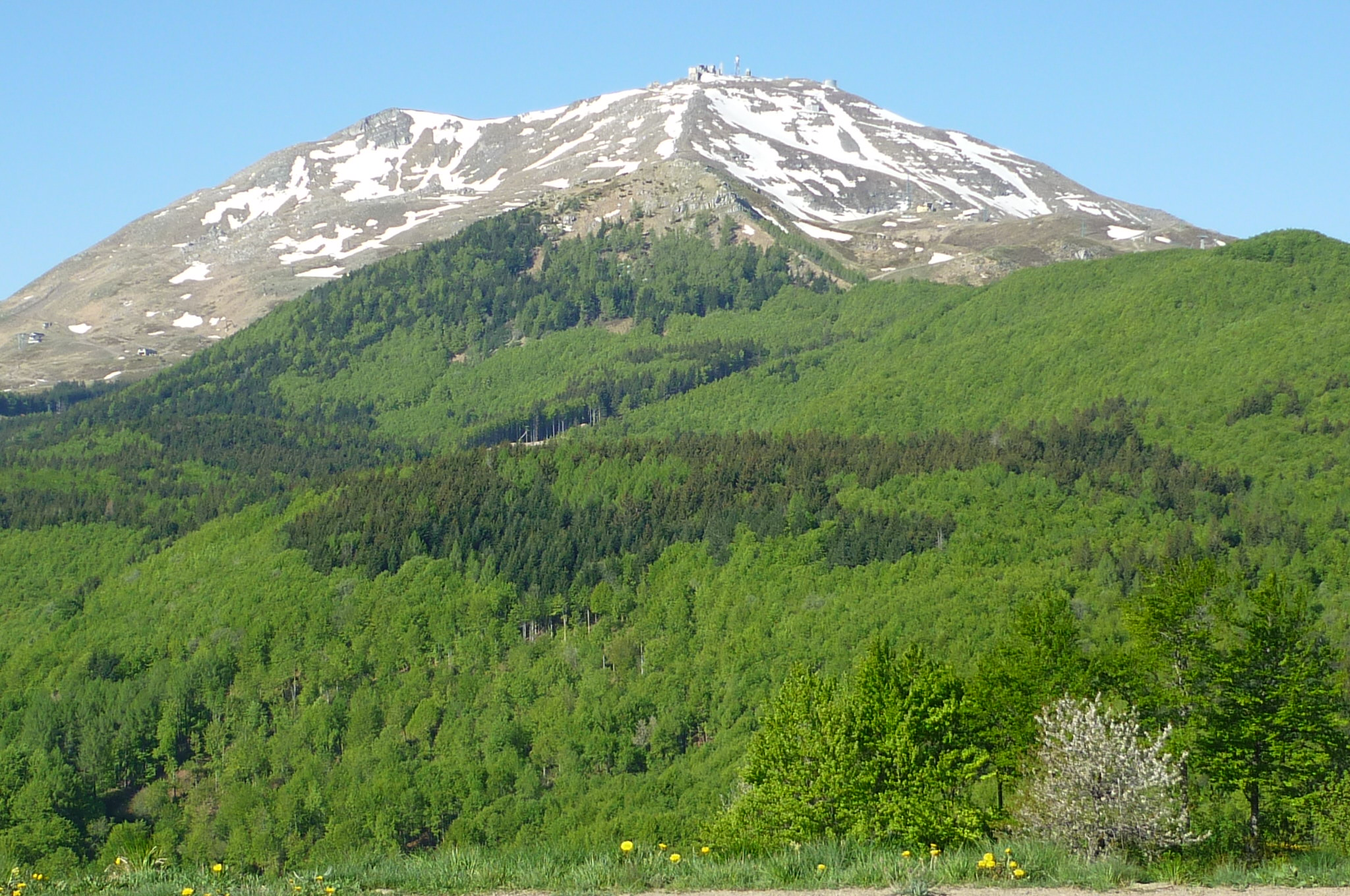
Apennine deciduous montane forests at Mount Cimone

- north and central: Apennine deciduous montane forests (temperate broadleaf and mixed forests biome)
- north through south: Italian sclerophyllous and semi-deciduous forests (Mediterranean forests, woodlands, and scrub biome)
- south: South Apennine mixed montane forests (also a Mediterranean biome)

The number of vascular plant species in the Apennines has been estimated at 5,599. Of these, 728 (23.6%) are in the treeline ecotone. Hemicryptophytes predominate in the entire Apennine chain.

==== Alpine zone ====
The tree line ecotone is mainly grasslands of the Montane grasslands and shrublands biome; with Temperate broadleaf and mixed forests, and Mediterranean forests, woodlands, and scrub below it. The tree line in the Apennines can be found in the range 1,600 m (5,200 ft) to 2,000 m (6,600 ft). About 5% of the map area covered by the Apennines is at or above the tree line—or in the treeline ecotone. The snow line is at about 3,200 m (10,500 ft), leaving the Apennines below it, except for the one remaining glacier. Snow may fall from October to May. Rainfall increases with latitude. The range's climates, depending on elevation and latitude, are the Oceanic climate and Mediterranean climate.

=== Fauna ===
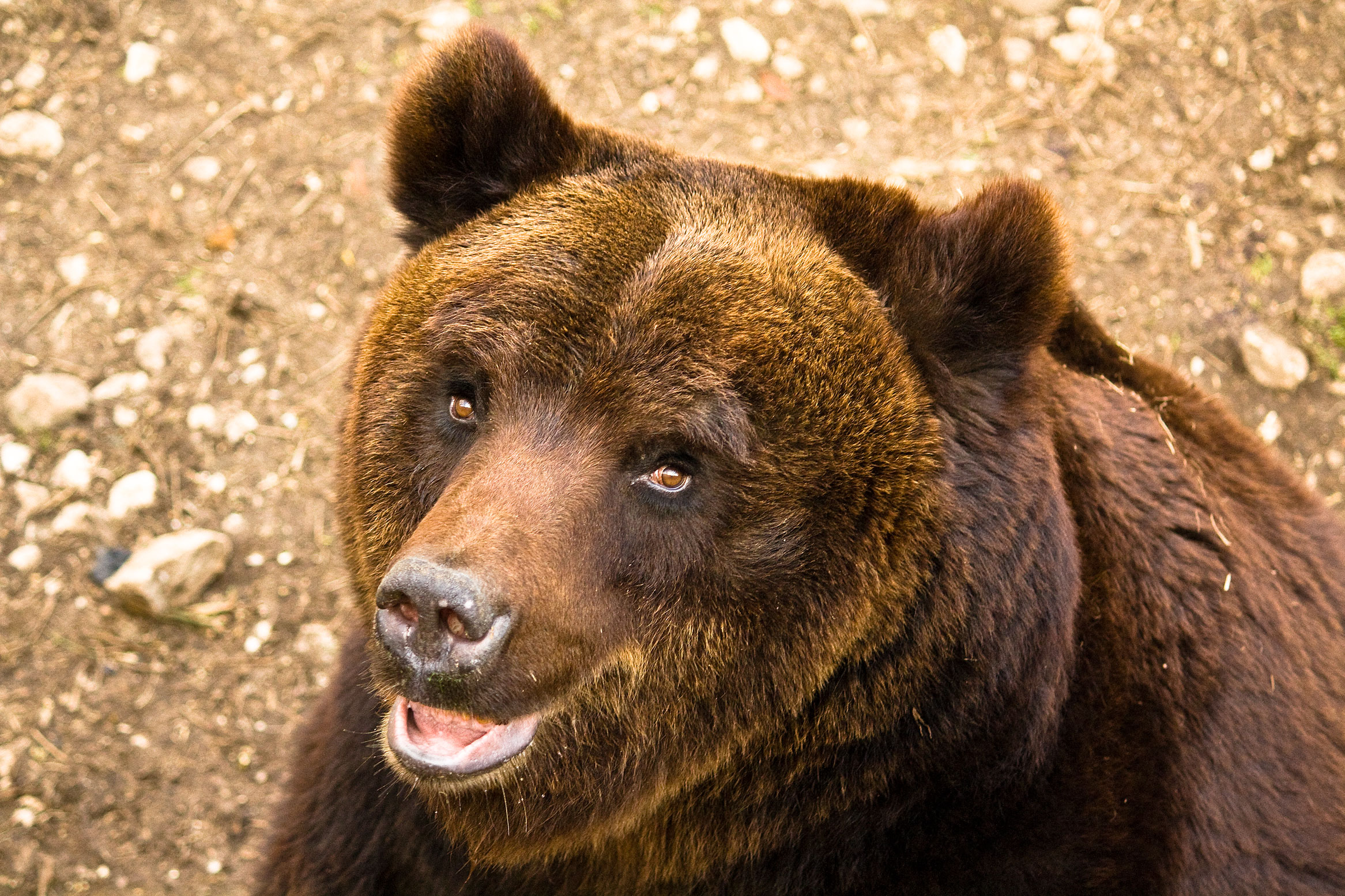
Marsican brown bear

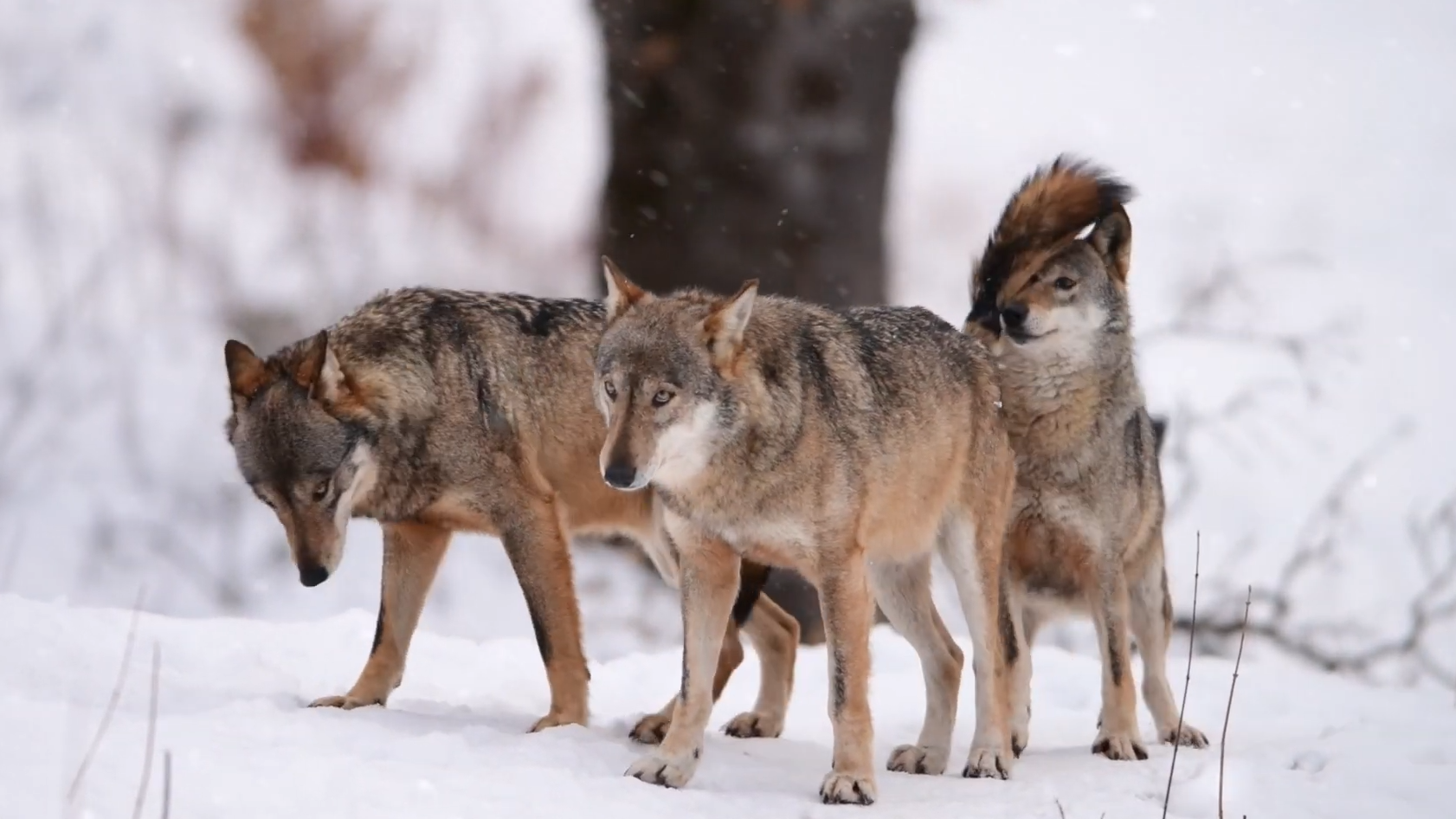
Italian wolf pack

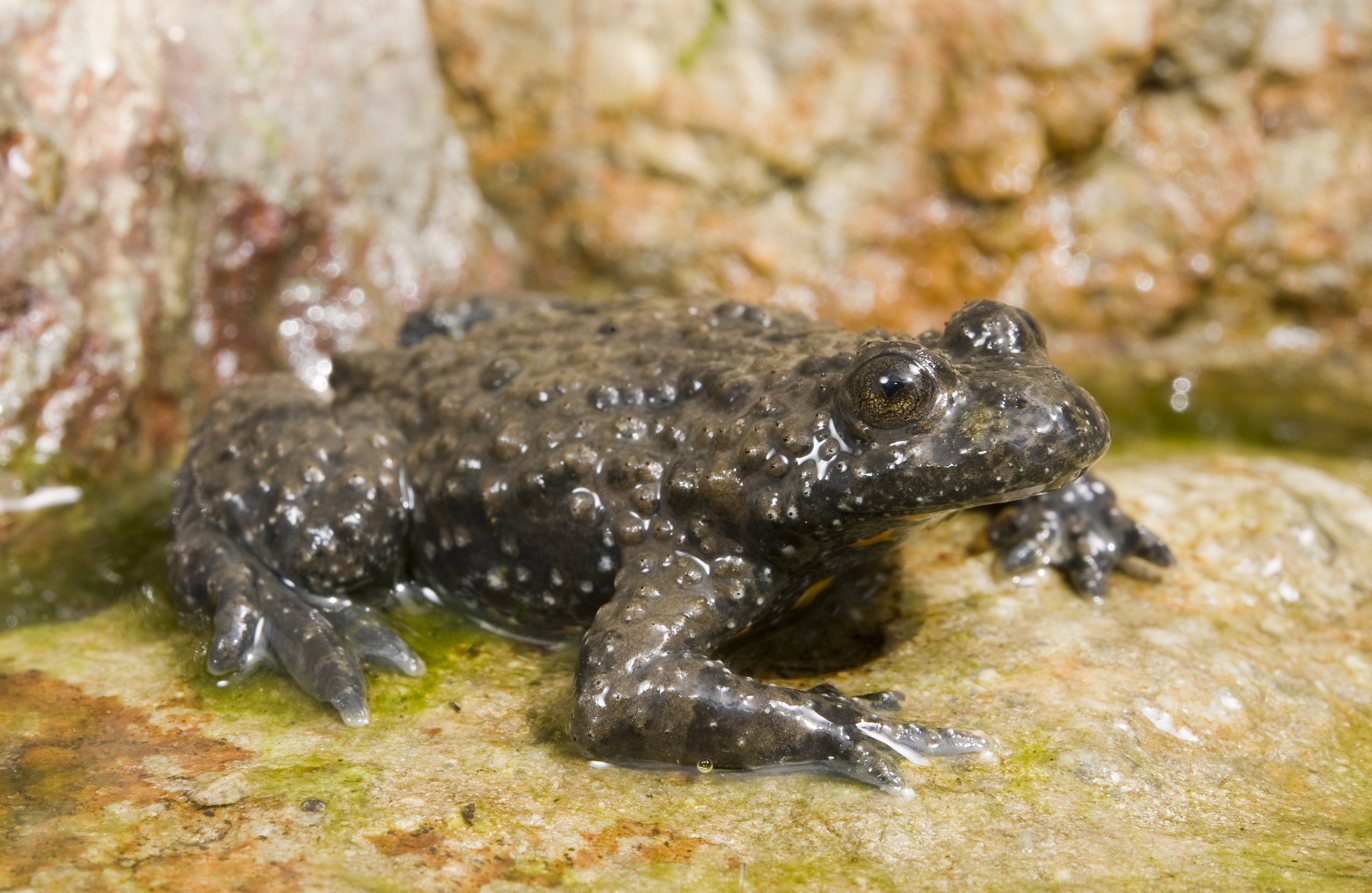
Apennine yellow-bellied toad

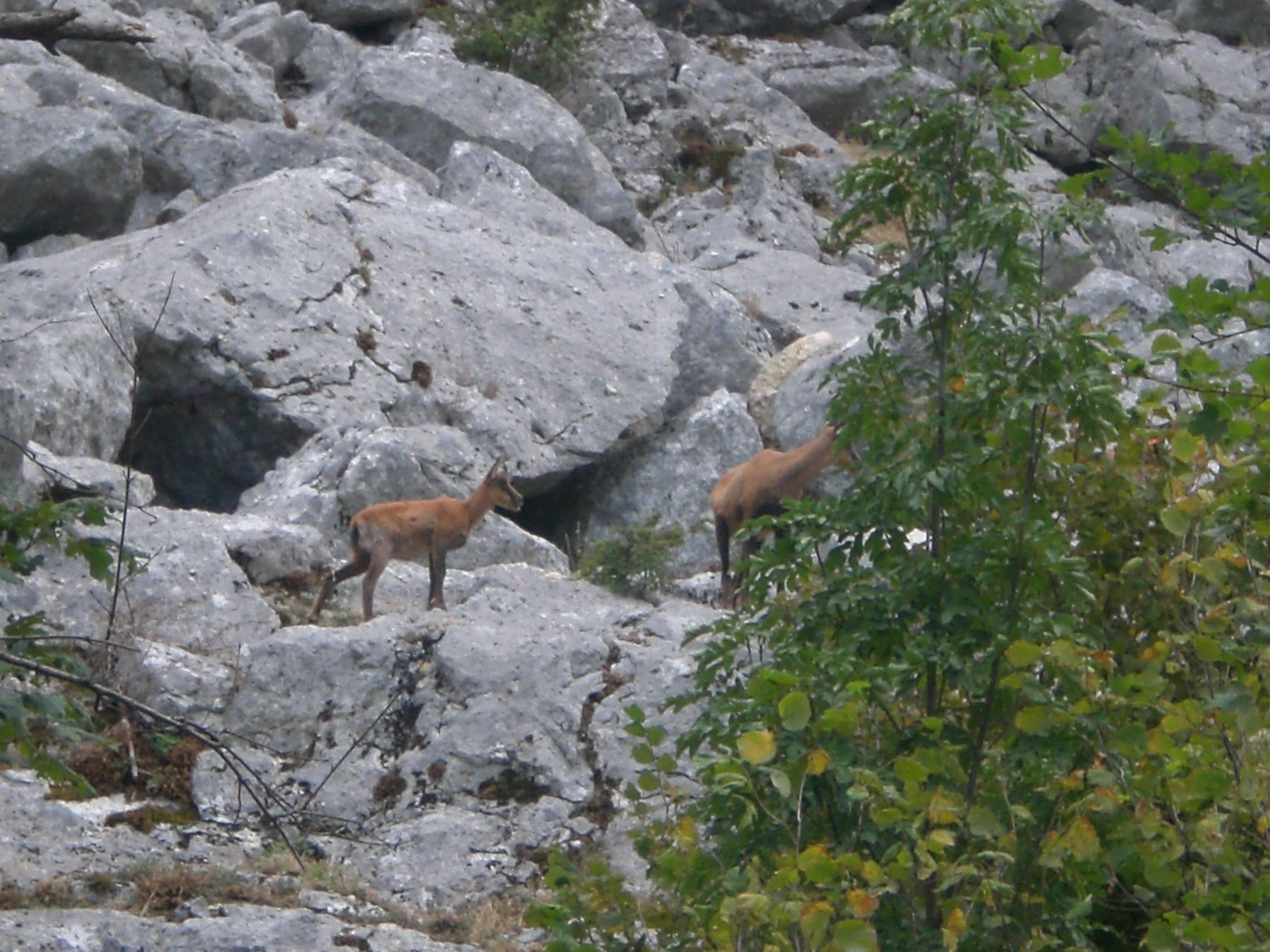
Abruzzo chamois

The mammal fauna is mainly composed of Italian wolves (endemic), Corsican hare, badgers, weasels, foxes, marmots, Etruscan shrew, Crested porcupine, European snow vole and Apennine shrews (endemic), Marsican brown bears (endemic), the European fallow deer, the European mouflon and the Pyrenean chamois.

There are also numerous birds such as the golden eagle, the Bonelli's eagle, the Eurasian goshawk, the hoopoe, the hawk, the European roller, the White-backed woodpecker, the European green woodpecker, the Alpine chough, the Egyptian vulture, the European nightjar, the Italian sparrow (endemic) and the Eurasian eagle-owl.

There are also numerous amphibians such as the Apennine yellow-bellied toad (endemic), the Italian cave salamander (endemic), the Italian newt (endemic), the Italian stream frog (endemic) and the Spectacled salamander (endemic), the Italian tree frog (endemic), the Agile frog, the Italian edible frog (endemic), the Common toad, the Balearic green toad, the Northern spectacled salamander (endemic), the Fire salamander, the Smooth newt, the Alpine newt, and the Italian crested newt.

The reptile fauna is mainly composed of such as the Italian Aesculapian snake (endemic), the Dice snake, the Green whip snake, the Aesculapian snake, the Smooth snake, the Vipera ursinii, the Vipera aspis, the Italian wall lizard (endemic), the Podarcis muralis, the European green lizard.

Notable Apennine freshwater fishes are the Brook lamprey (endemic), Lombardy lamprey, Italian bleak (endemic), Horse barbel (endemic), Eurasian carp, Scardola scardafa (endemic), European perch, Chubius Chub, Tench and Northern pike.

The Italian wolf is the national animal of Italy, while the national bird of the country is the Italian sparrow. The reasons for this choice are related to the fact that the Italian wolf, which inhabits the Apennine Mountains and the Western Alps, features prominently in Latin and Italian cultures, such as in the legend of the founding of Rome.

=== Transhumance ===
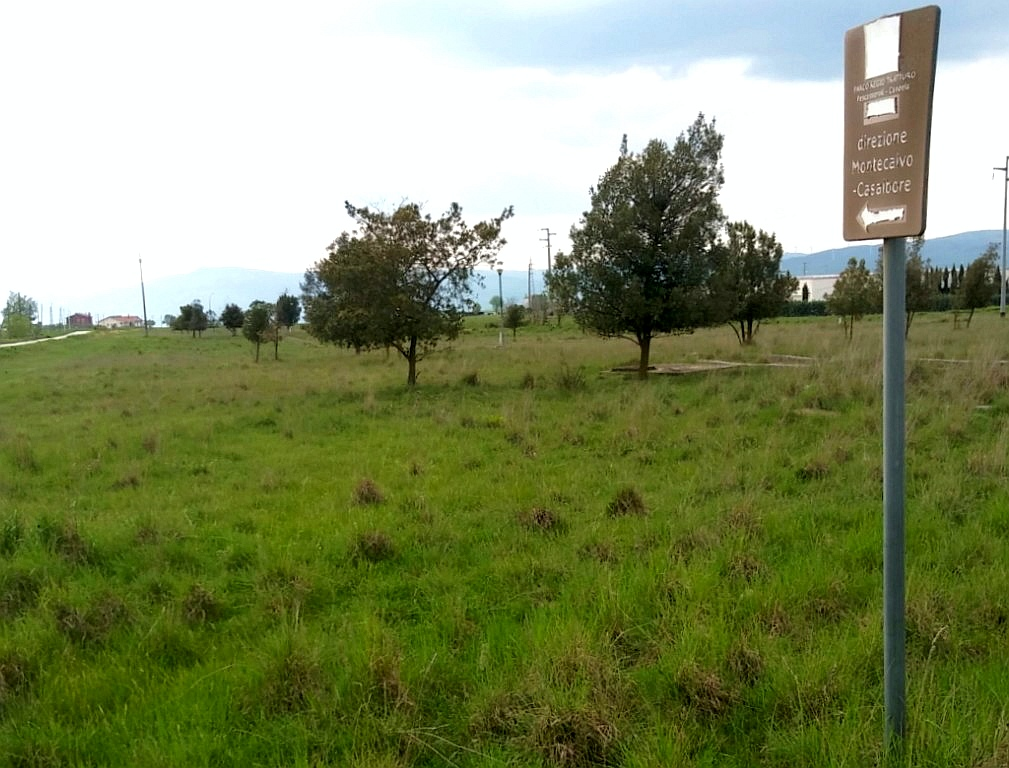
Sheep-track near to Ariano Irpino, Campanian Apennine

In Italy the transhumance took place mainly starting from the Abruzzi Apennines, moving both towards the Tuscan and Lazio Maremma and above all towards the Tavoliere delle Puglie. The Apennines are to some extent covered with forests, though these were probably more extensive in classical times (Pliny mentions especially pine, oak and beech woods, Hist. Nat. xvi. 177); they have indeed been greatly reduced in comparatively modern times by indiscriminate timber-felling, and though serious attempts at reforestation have been made by the government, much remains to be done.

They also furnish considerable summer pastures, especially in the Abruzzi: Pliny (Hist. Nat. xi. 240) praises the cheese of the Apennines. In the forests Italian wolves were frequent, and still are found, the flocks being protected against them by large sheep-dogs; Marsican brown bears, however, which were known in Roman times, have almost entirely disappeared. Nor are the wild goats called rotae, spoken of by Marcus Terentius Varro (Rerum rusticarum II. i. 5), which may have been either Pyrenean chamois or steinbock, to be found.

Brigandage appears to have been prevalent in Roman times in the more remote parts of the Apennines, as it was long later until 19th century, when post-unification Italian brigandage was eventually eradicated. An inscription found near the Furlo pass was set up in AD 246 by an evocatus Augusti (a member of a picked corps) on special police duty with a detachment of twenty men from the Ravenna fleet.

Snow lies on the highest peaks of the Apennines for almost the whole year. The range produces no minerals, but there are a considerable number of good mineral springs, some of which are thermal (such as Bagni di Lucca, Montecatini, Monsummano, Porretta, Telese), while others are cool (such as Nocera, Sangemini, Cinciano), the water of which is both drunk on the spot and sold as table water elsewhere.

=== National parks ===
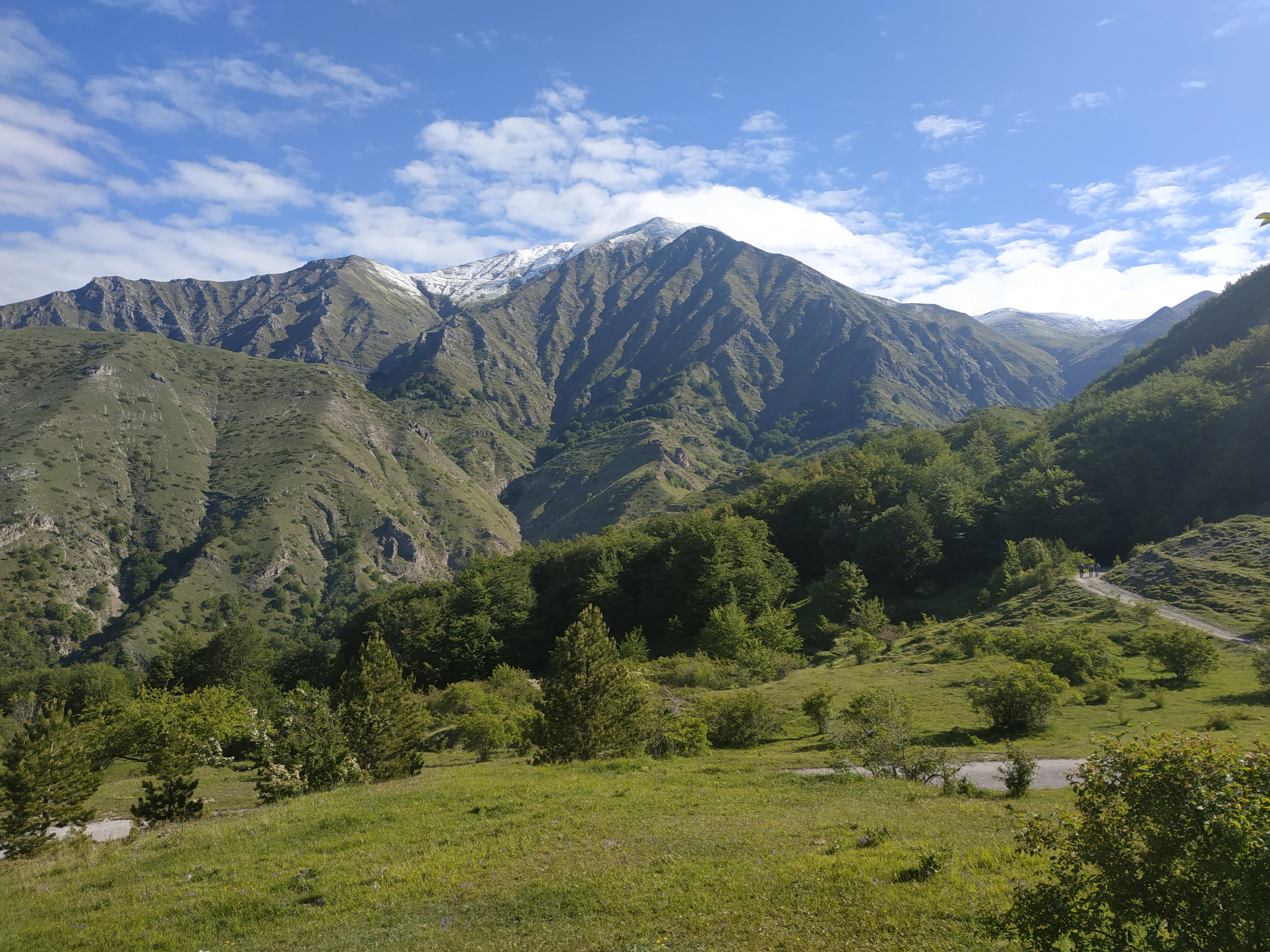
Abruzzo, Lazio and Molise National Park, the oldest Italian national park in the Apennine Mountains and the second oldest in Italy

The Apennines are home to twelve Italian national parks: the Appennino Tosco-Emiliano National Park, the Foreste Casentinesi, Monte Falterona, Campigna National Park, the Monti Sibillini National Park, the Gran Sasso e Monti della Laga National Park, the Abruzzo, Lazio and Molise National Park, the Maiella National Park, the Pollino National Park, the Vesuvius National Park, the Cilento, Vallo di Diano and Alburni National Park, the Appennino Lucano - Val d'Agri - Lagonegrese National Park, the Sila National Park, the Aspromonte National Park.

=== Hydrography ===
Important rivers originate from the Apennines are the Panaro, the Secchia, the Reno, the Marecchia, the Rubicon, the Metauro, the Arno, the Tiber, the Savio, the Nera, the Velino, the Tronto, the Aterno-Pescara, the Aniene, the Liri, the Sangro and the Volturno. Among the lakes of glacial origin of the Alpine type is Lago di Pilato.

== Geology ==
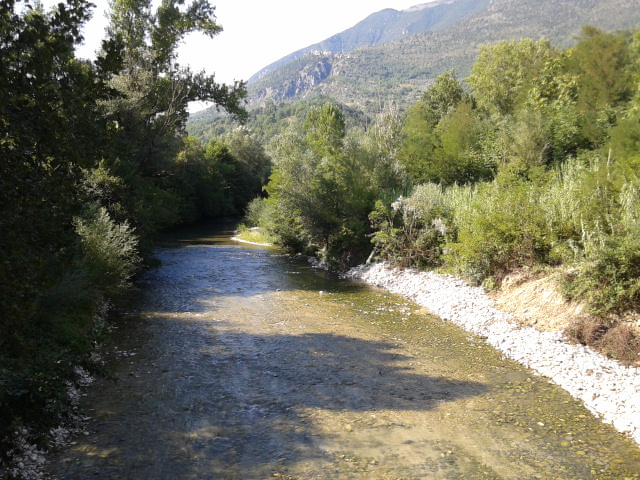
Liri river

The Apennines were created in the Apennine orogeny beginning in the early Neogene (about 20 mya, the middle Miocene) and continuing today. Geographically they are partially (or appear to be) continuous with the Alpine system. Prior to the explosion of data on the topic from about the year 2000, many authors took the approach that the Apennines had the same origin as the Alps. Even today, some authors use the term Alpine-Apennine system. They are not, however, the same system and did not have the same origin. The Alps were millions of years old before the Apennines rose from the sea.

The northward movement of the African Plate and its collision with the European Plate then caused the Alpine Orogeny, beginning in the late Mesozoic. The band of mountains created extends from Spain to Turkey in a roughly east–west direction and includes the Alps. The Apennines are much younger, extend from northwest to southeast, and are not a displacement of the Alpine chain.

The key evidence of the difference is the geologic behavior of the Po Valley in northern Italy. Compressional forces have been acting from north to south in the Alps and from south to north in the Apennines, but instead of being squeezed into mountains the valley has been subsiding at 1 to 4 mm (0.16 in) per year since about 25 mya, before the Apennines existed. It is now known to be not an erosional feature, but is a filled portion of the Adriatic Trench, called the Adriatic foredeep after its function as a subduction zone was discovered.

=== Apennine orogeny ===
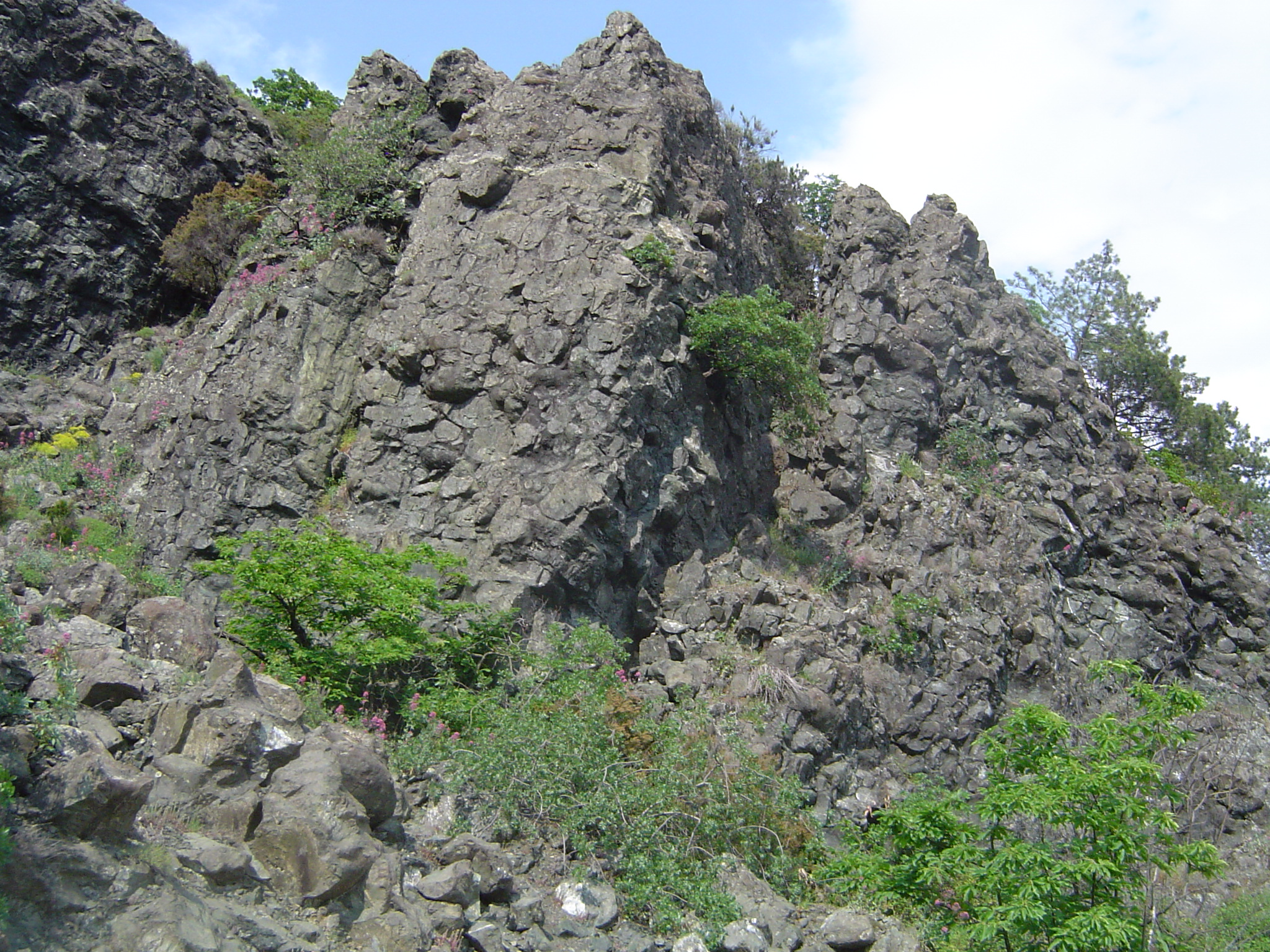
A pillow lava from an ophiolite sequence, Northern Apennines

The Apennine orogeny is a type of mountain-building in which two simpler types are combined in an apparently paradoxical configuration. Sometimes this is referred to as "syn-orogenic extension", but the term implies that the two processes occur simultaneously during time. Some scientists imagine that this is relatively rare but not unique in mountain building, whereas others imagine that this is fairly common in all mountain belts.

The RETREAT Project (Note: The Retreating-trench, extension and accretion (RETREAT) Project is a study conducted by a consortium of scientific organizations in different countries including in the US the National Science Foundation.) have this specific feature as one of their focus points In essence the east side of Italy features a fold and thrust belt raised by compressional forces acting under the Adriatic Sea. This side has been called the "Apennine-Adriatic Compressional Zone" or the "Apennines Convergence Zone." On the west side of Italy fault-block mountains prevail, created by a spreading or extension of the crust under the Tyrrhenian Sea. This side is called the "Tyrrhenian Extensional Zone." The mountains of Italy are of paradoxical provenience, having to derive from both compression and extension:

"The paradox of how contraction and extension can occur simultaneously in convergent mountain belts remains a fundamental and largely unresolved problem in continental dynamics."

Both the folded and the fault-block systems include parallel mountain chains. In the folded system anticlines erode into the highest and longest massifs of the Apennines.

According to the older theories (originating from the 1930s to 1970s) of Dutch geologists, including Van Bemmelen, compression and extension can and should occur simultaneously at different depths in a mountain belt. In these theories, these different levels are called Stockwerke. More recent work in geotectonics and geodynamics of the same school of geoscientists (Utrecht and Amsterdam University) by Vlaar, Wortel, and Cloetingh, and their disciples, extended these concepts even further into a temporal realm. They demonstrated that internal and external forces acting upon the mountain belt (e.g., slab pull and intra-plate stress field modulations due to large scale reorganisations of the tectonic plates) result in both longer episodes and shorter phases of general extension and compression acting both upon and inside mountain belts and tectonic arches (See e.g. for extensive reviews, bibliography and discussions on the literature: Van Dijk (1992), Van Dijk and Okkes (1991), Van Dijk & Scheepers (1995), and Van Dijk et al. (2000a)).

==== Compressional zone ====
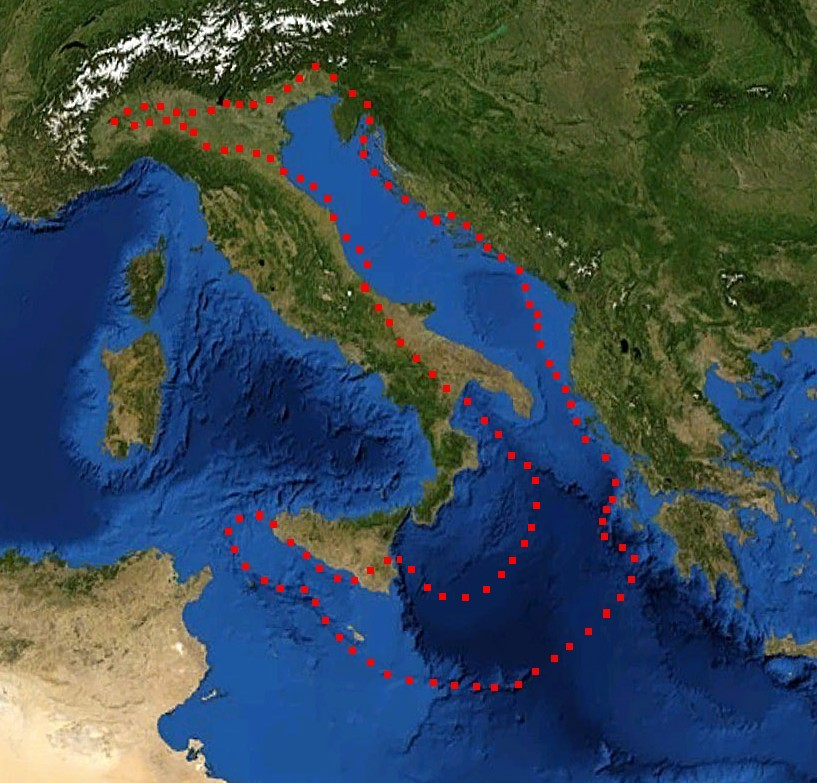
Boundaries of the Adriatic Plate

The gradual subsidence of the Po Valley (including that of Venice) and the folding of the mountains of eastern Italy have been investigated using seismic wave analysis of the "Apennine Subduction System." Along the Adriatic side of Italy the floor of the Adriatic Sea, referred to as the "Adriatic lithosphere" or the "Adriatic plate," terms whose precise meaning is the subject of ongoing research, is dipping under the slab on which the Apennines have been folded by compressional forces.

Subduction occurs along a fault, along which a hanging wall, or overriding slab is thrust over an overridden slab, also called the subducting slab. In north Italy the dip of this interface is 30° to 40° at a depth of 80–90 km.

The strike of the Apennine subduction zone forms a long, irregular arc with centers of curvature in the Tyrrhenian Sea following the hanging wall over which the mountains have been raised; i.e., the eastern wall of the mountains. It runs from near the base of the Ligurian Apennines in the Po Valley along the margin of the mountains to the Adriatic, along the coastal deeps of the Adriatic shore, strikes inland at Monte Gargano cutting off Apulia, out to sea again through the Gulf of Taranto, widely around the rest of Italy and Sicily and across inland north Africa. The upper mantle above 250 km (160 mi) deep is broken into the "Northern Apennines Arc" and the "Calabrian Arc", with compressional forces acting in different directions radially toward the arcs' centers of curvature.

==== Extensional zone ====
The west side of Italy is given to a fault-block system, where the crust – extended by the lengthening mantle below – thinned, broke along roughly parallel fault lines, and the blocks alternatively sank into grabens or were raised by isostasy into horsts. This system prevails from Corsica eastward to the valley of the Tiber River, the last rift valley in that direction. It runs approximately across the direction of extension. In the fault-block system, the ridges are lower and are more steep-sided, since the walls are formed by faults. Geographically they are not considered part of the Apennines proper but are termed Sub-Apennines (Subappennini) or Anti-Apennines (Antiappennini) or Pre-Apennines (Preappennini). These mountains are found mainly in Tuscany, Lazio and Campania.

=== Stability of terrain ===
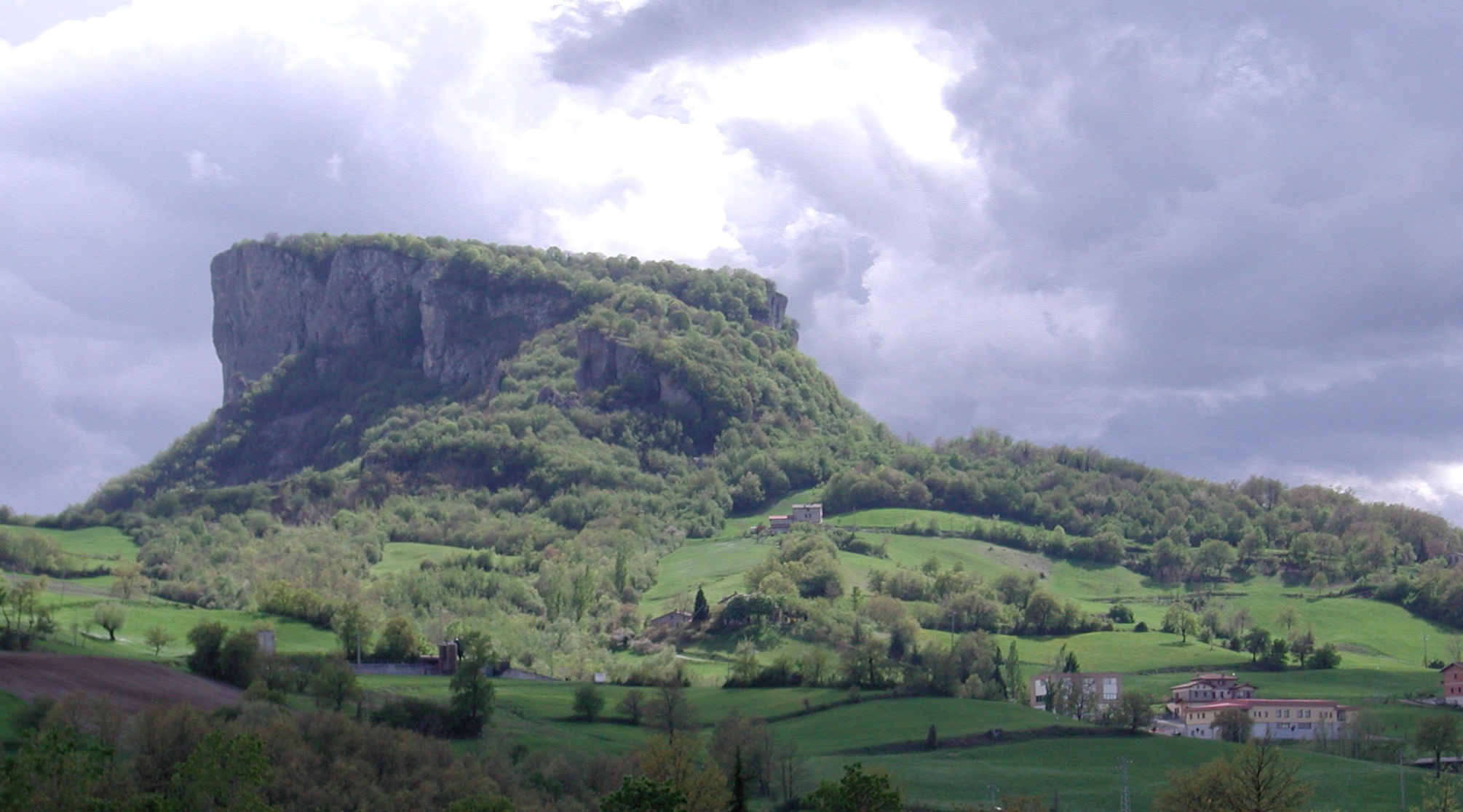
The Pietra di Bismantova, Emilian Apennines, Emilia-Romagna

The terrain of the Apennines (as well as that of the Alps) is to a large degree unstable due to various types of landslides, including falls and slides of rocks and debris, flows of earth and mud, and sink holes. The Institute for Environmental Protection and Research (Istituto Superiore per la Protezione e la Ricerca Ambientale), a government agency founded in 2008 by combining three older agencies, published in that year a special report, Landslides in Italy, summarizing the results of the IFFI Project (Il Progetto IFFI), the Italian Landslide Inventory (Inventario dei Fenomeni Franosi in Italia), an extensive survey of historical landslides in Italy undertaken by the government starting in 1997. By December 31, 2007, it had studied and mapped 482,272 landslides over 20,500 km^{2} (7,900 sq mi). Its major statistics are the Landslide Index (LI here), the ratio of the landslide area to the total area of a region, the Landslide Index in Mountainous-Hilly Areas (here LIMH) and the Density of Landslides, which is the number per 100 km^{2} (39 sq mi).

Italy as a whole has a LI of 6.8, a LIMH of 9.1 and a density of 160. Lombardy (LI of 13.9), Emilia-Romagna (11.4), Marches (19.4), Molise (14.0), Valle d'Aosta (16.0) and Piedmont (9.1) are significantly higher. The most unstable terrain in the Apennines when the landslide sites are plotted on the map are in order from most unstable the eastern flanks of the Tuscan–Emilian Apennines, the Central Apennines and the eastern flank of the southern Apennines. Instability there is comparable to the Alps bordering the Po Valley. The most stable terrain is on the western side: Liguria, Tuscany, Umbria and Lazio. The Apennines are slumping away to the northeast into the Po Valley and the Adriatic foredeep; that is, the zone where the Adriatic floor is being subducted under Italy. Slides with large translational or rotational surface movements are most common; e.g., a whole slope slumps into its valley, placing the population there at risk.

=== Glacial ice ===
Glaciers no longer exist in the Apennines outside the Gran Sasso d'Italia massif. However, post-Pliocene moraines have been observed in Basilicata.

== Major peaks ==
The Apennines include about 21 peaks over 1,900 m (6,200 ft), the approximate tree line (counting only the top peak in each massif). Most of these peaks are located in the Central Apennines.

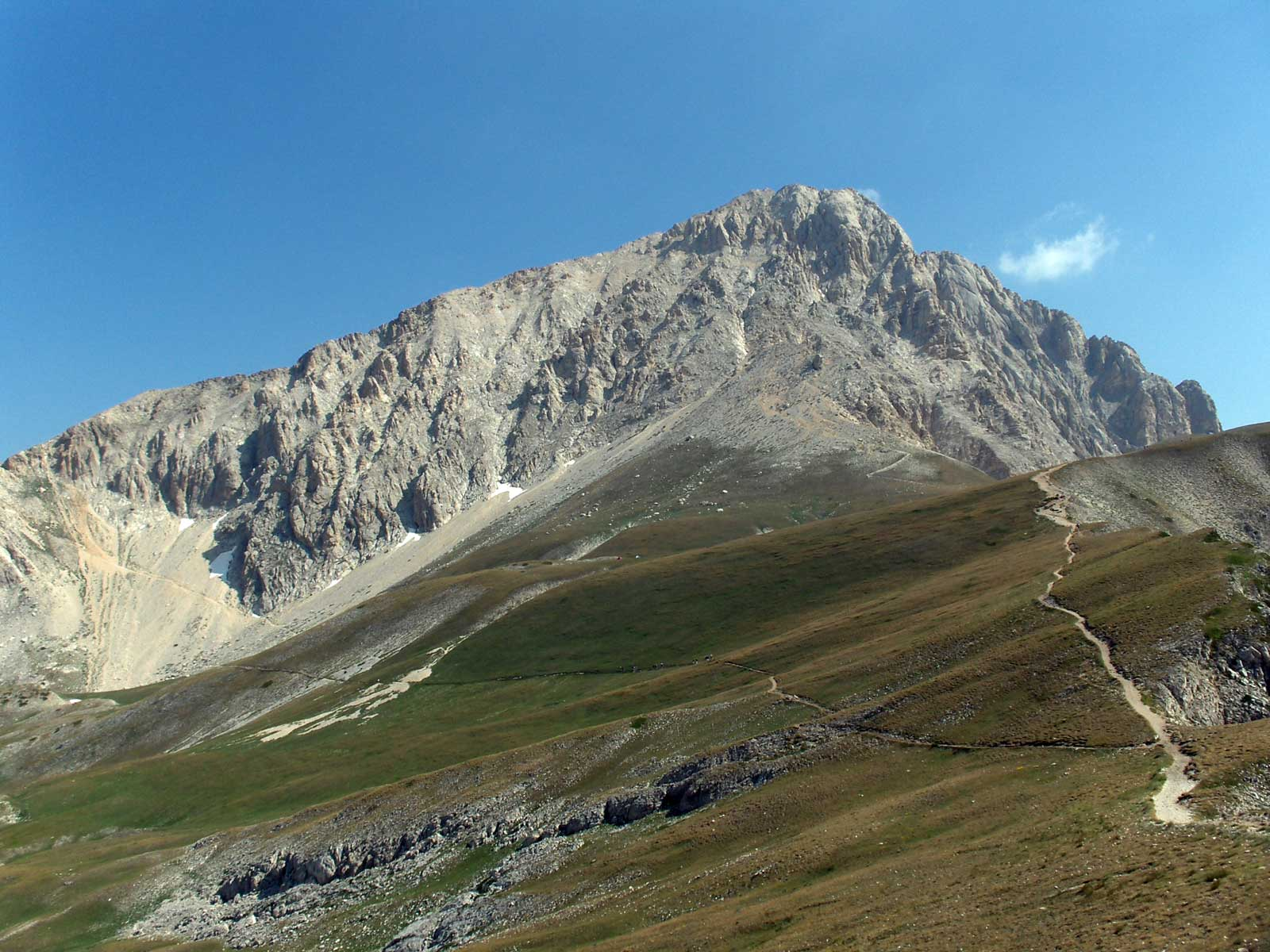
Corno Grande

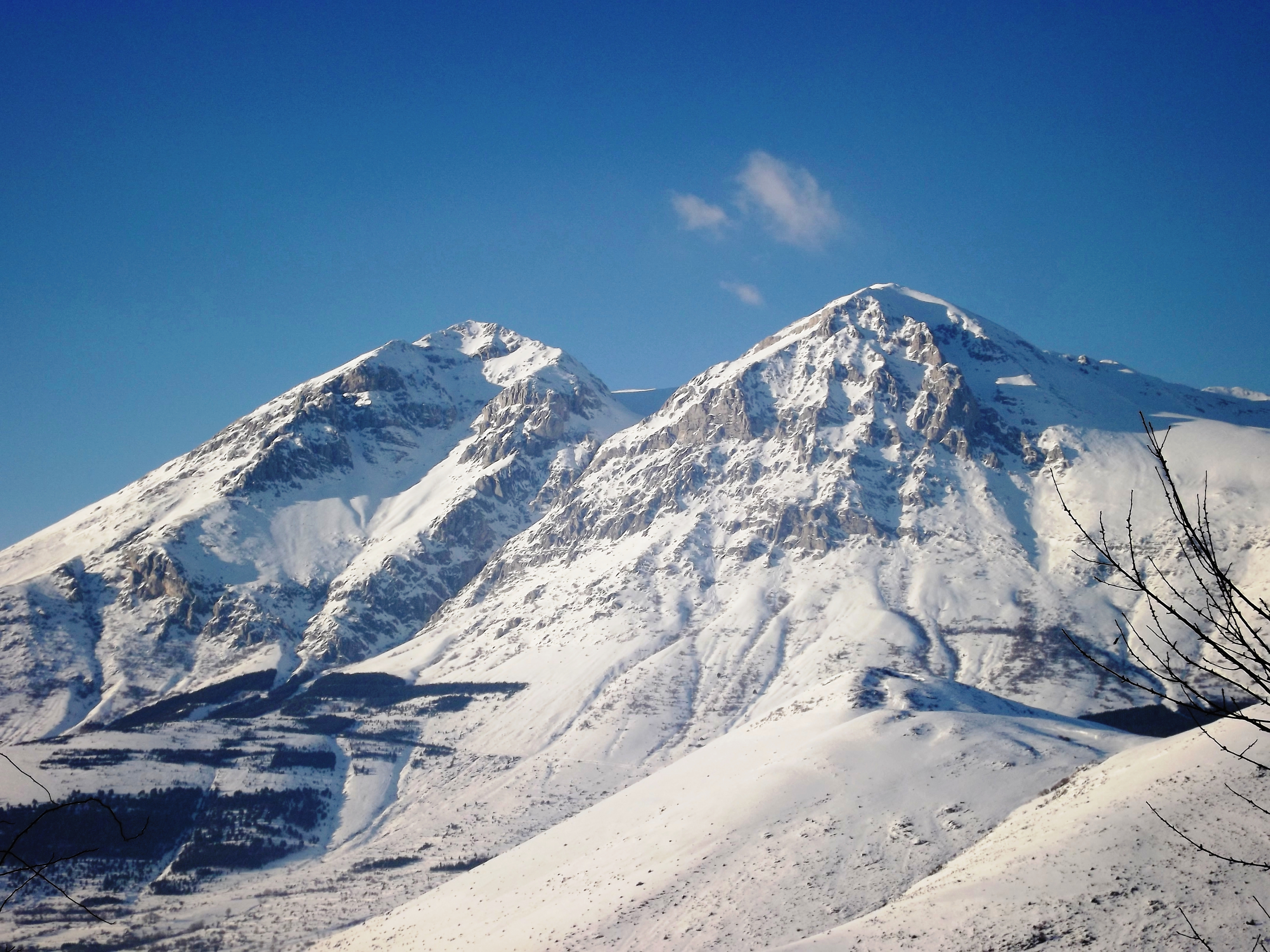
Monte Velino

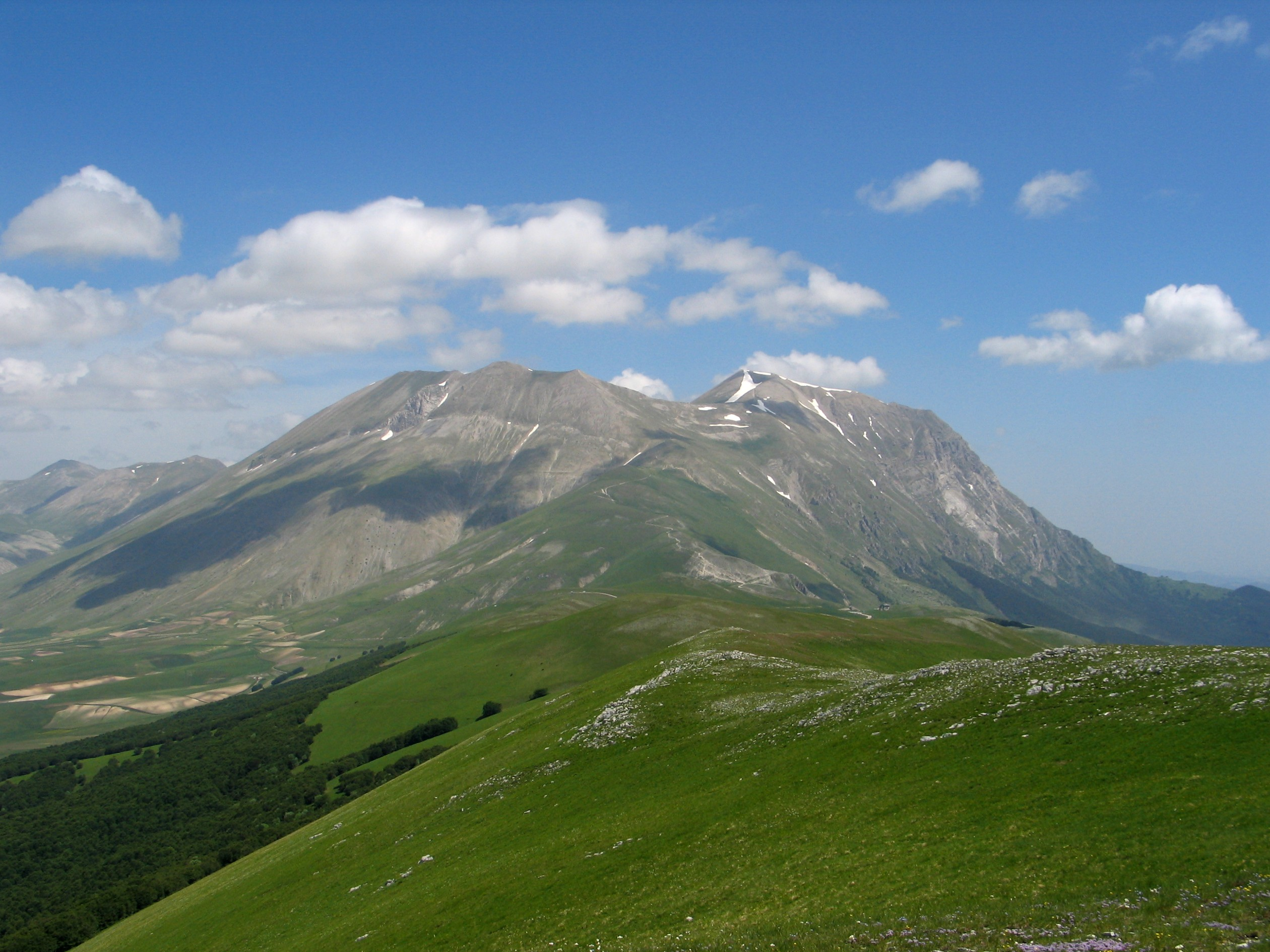
Monte Vettore

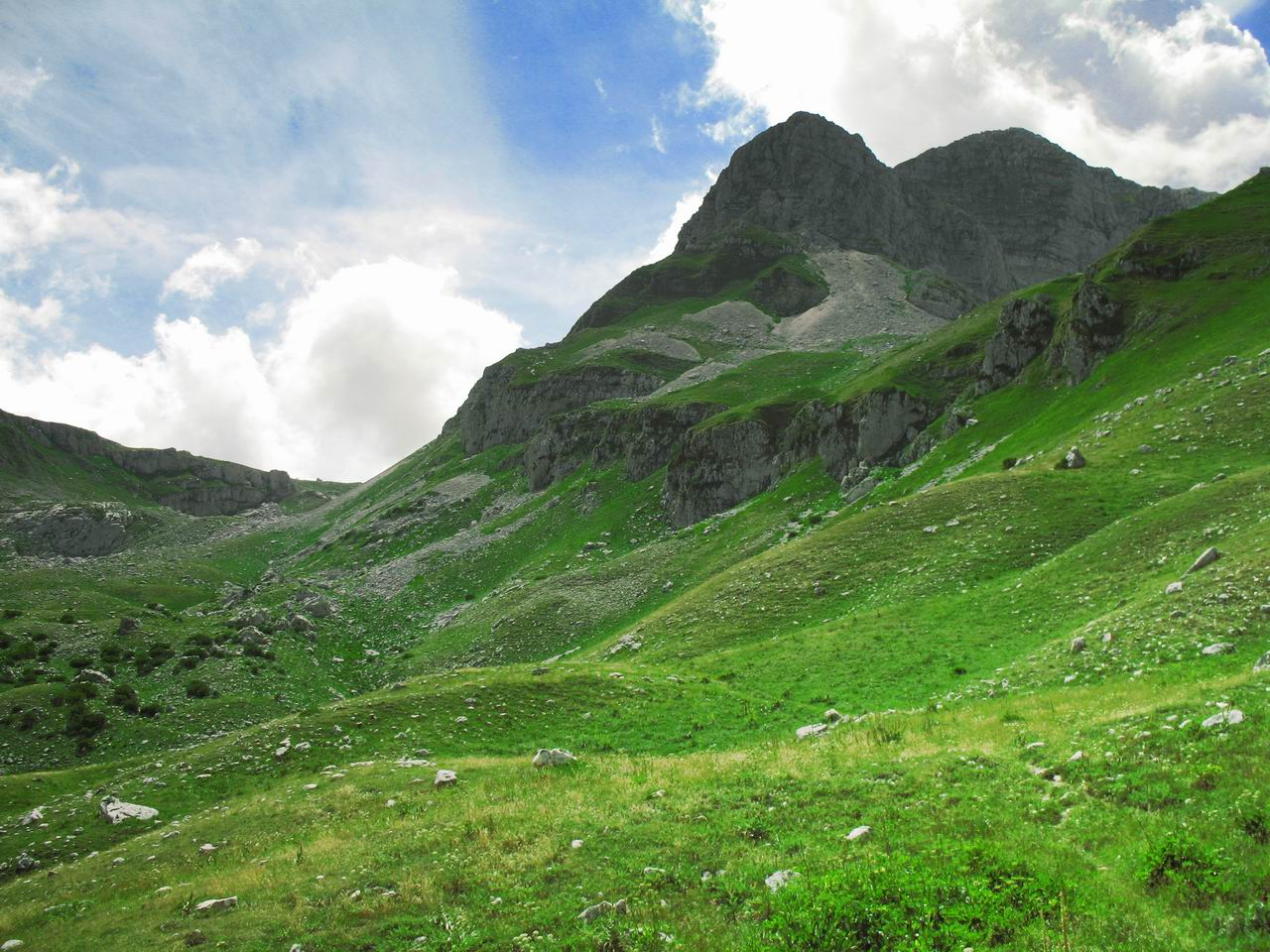
Monte Meta

| Name | Height |
|---|---|
| Corno Grande (Gran Sasso massif) | 2,912 m (9,554 ft) |
| Monte Amaro (Majella massif) | 2,793 m (9,163 ft) |
| Monte Velino | 2,486 m (8,156 ft) |
| Monte Vettore | 2,476 m (8,123 ft) |
| Pizzo di Sevo | 2,419 m (7,936 ft) |
| Serra Dolcedorme (Pollino massif) | 2,267 m (7,438 ft) |
| Monte Meta | 2,241 m (7,352 ft) |
| Monte Terminillo | 2,217 m (7,274 ft) |
| Monte Sibilla | 2,173 m (7,129 ft) |
| Monte Cimone | 2,165 m (7,103 ft) |
| Monte Viglio | 2,156 m (7,073 ft) |
| Monte Cusna | 2,121 m (6,959 ft) |
| Montagne del Morrone | 2,061 m (6,762 ft) |
| Monte Prado | 2,053 m (6,736 ft) |
| Monte Miletto (Matese massif) | 2,050 m (6,730 ft) |
| Alpe di Succiso | 2,017 m (6,617 ft) |
| Monte Cotento (Simbruini range) | 2,015 m (6,611 ft) |
| Monte Sirino | 2,005 m (6,578 ft) |
| Montalto (Aspromonte massif) | 1,955 m (6,414 ft) |
| Monte Pisanino | 1,946 m (6,385 ft) |
| Monte Botte Donato (Sila plateau) | 1,928 m (6,325 ft) |
| Corno alle Scale | 1,915 m (6,283 ft) |
| Monte Alto | 1,904 m (6,247 ft) |
| Monte Alpi | 1,900 m (6,200 ft) |
| Monte Cervati | 1,898 m (6,227 ft) |
| La Nuda | 1,894 m (6,214 ft) |
| Monte Maggio | 1,853 m (6,079 ft) |
| Monte Maggiorasca | 1,799 m (5,902 ft) |
| Monte Giovarello | 1,760 m (5,770 ft) |
| Monte Catria | 1,701 m (5,581 ft) |
| Monte Gottero | 1,640 m (5,380 ft) |
| Monte Pennino | 1,560 m (5,120 ft) |
| Monte Nerone | 1,525 m (5,003 ft) |
| Monte San Vicino | 1,480 m (4,860 ft) |
| Monte Fumaiolo | 1,407 m (4,616 ft) |

== See also ==
- Geography of Italy
- List of national parks of Italy
- List of longest tunnels
- List of highest paved roads in Europe
- List of mountain passes
- Lunar Apennine mountains

== Bibliography ==
- "Apennines". Merriam-Webster's Geographical Dictionary (3rd ed.). Merriam-Webster, Incorporated. 2001.
- Blackie, Christina; Blackie, John Stuart (1887). Geographical etymology, a dictionary of place-names giving their derivations. London: Murray.
- Deecke, W (1904). Italy; a popular account of the country, its people, and its institutions (including Malta and Sardinia). Translated by Nesbitt, H A. London; New York: Macmillan Co.; S. Sonnenschein & Co.
- Lunardi, Pietro (2008). Design and construction of tunnels: analysis of controlled deformation in rocks and soils (ADECO-RS). Berlin: Springer.
- Margheriti, Lucia; et al. (August–October 2006). "The subduction structure of the Northern Apennines: results for the RETREAT seismic deployment" (PDF). Annals of Geophysics. 49 (4/5). Archived from the original (PDF) on 19 June 2010.
- Martini, I. Peter; Vai, Gian Battista (2001). "Geomorphologic Setting". In Martini, I. Peter; Vai, Gian Battista (eds.). Anatomy of an orogen: the Apennines and adjacent Mediterranean basins. Dordrecht [u.a.]: Kluwer Academic Publishers. pp. 1–4..
- Barchi, Massimiliano; Landuzzi, Alberto; Minelli, Giorgio; Pialli, Giampaolo (2001). "Inner Northern Apennines". In Martini, I. Peter; Vai, Gian Battista (eds.). Anatomy of an orogen: the Apennines and adjacent Mediterranean basins. Dordrecht [u.a.]: Kluwer Academic Publishers. pp. 215–254..
- Pedrotti, F.; Gafta, D. (2003). "The High Mountain Flora and Vegetation of the Apennines and the Italian Alps". In Nagy, László; Grabherr, G.; Körner, Ch.; Thompson, D.B.A. (eds.). Alpine biodiversity in Europe. Ecological studies, 167. Berlin, Heidelberg [u.a.]: Springer-Verlag. pp. 73–84..

Attribution
