= San Ginesio =

Comune in Marche, Italy

- Comune
- Comune di San Ginesio
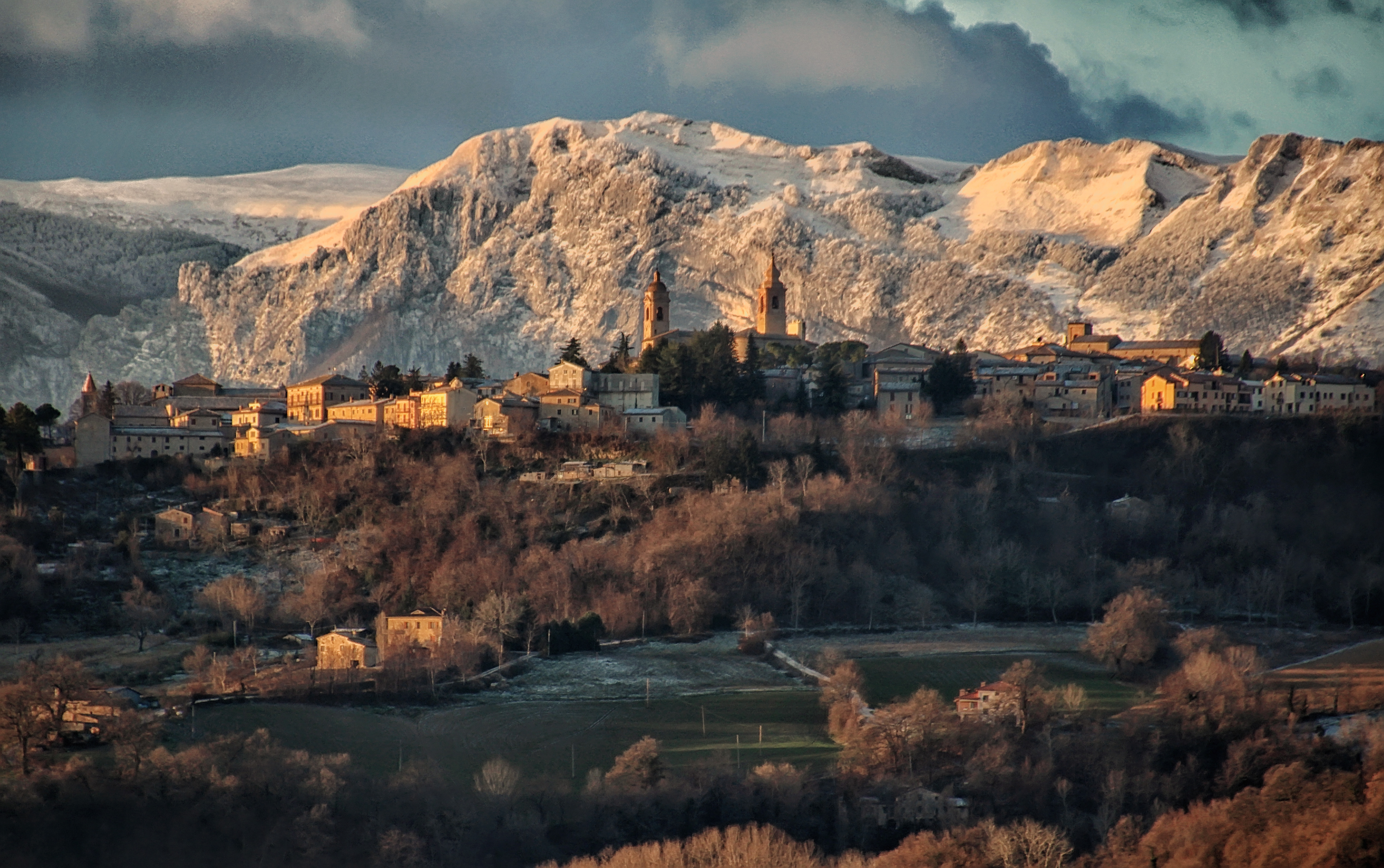
- View of San Ginesio

- Coat of arms

- Location within Italy Location within Marche
- Coordinates: 43°6′N 13°19′E
- Country: Italy
- Region: Marche
- Province: Macerata (MC)
- Frazioni: Botondolo, Campanelle, Cardarello, Casa Gatti, Cerqueto, Colle, Collina, Ficcardo, Fontepeschiera, Macchie, Maregnano, Morichella, Morico, Passo San Ginesio, Pian di Pieca (Pieca and Santa Maria di Pieca) Rocca Colonnalta, San Liberato, Santa Croce, Santa Maria in Alto Cielo, Torre di Morro, Vallato, Vallimestre

Government
  - Mayor: Giuliano Ciabocco

Area
  - Total: 78.02 km^{2} (30.12 sq mi)
- Elevation: 690 m (2,260 ft)

Population (December 31, 2024)
  - Total: 3,040
  - Density: 39.0/km^{2} (101/sq mi)
- Demonym: Ginesini
- Time zone: UTC+1 (CET)
  - Summer (DST): UTC+2 (CEST)
- Postal code: 62026
- Dialing code: 0733
- Patron saint: St. Genesius of Rome
- Saint day: August 25
- Website: Official website

San Ginesio is an Italian municipality with a population of 3,040 inhabitants located in the Province of Macerata within the Marche region. It is one of I Borghi più belli d'Italia ("The most beautiful villages of Italy").

== Physical geography ==
=== Territory ===
The municipality of San Ginesio is situated at an elevation of 680 metres (2,230 ft) above sea level, making it the fifth highest and the twelfth largest in terms of land area within the Province of Macerata. Positioned 60 kilometers (37 miles) from Ancona and 25 kilometers (16 miles) from Macerata, it borders the Via Picena, specifically the SS 78, which connects the Macerata territory to the Sibillini Mountains. The average minimum elevation of its territory is 196 meters (643 feet), while the maximum reaches 1,294 metres (4,245 ft). Nestled within the Sibillini Mountains National Park, its elevated position offers a sweeping panorama stretching from the Conero to the Umbrian-Marchean Apennines, encompassing views of Monte San Vicino, the entirety of the Sibillini Mountains (including Monte Vettore, Cima del Redentore, Monte Sibilla, Monte Porche, Monte Priora, Pizzo Berro, Pizzo Tre Vescovi, and Monte Rotondo), and extending as far as Monte Ascensione and the Gran Sasso. This scenic vantage point has earned San Ginesio the nickname "the balcony of the Sibillini". One of the highest inhabited points in the territory is the hamlet of San Liberato, located at approximately 800 meters (2,625 feet) above sea level.

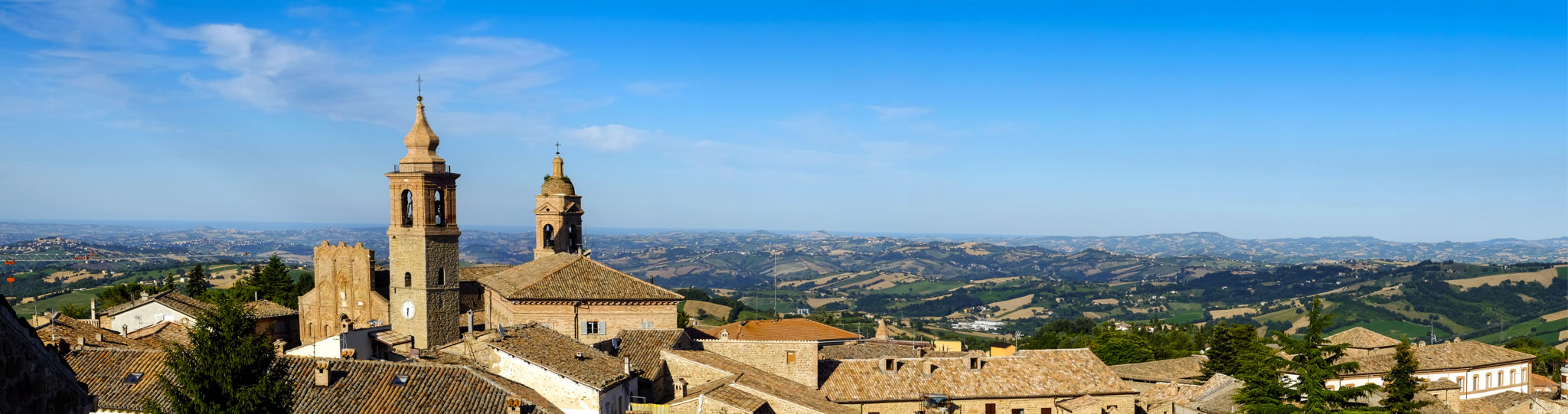
Panorama from San Ginesio facing northeast

The town, also affectionately dubbed "the town of 100 churches" due to its rich ecclesiastical heritage, occupies a privileged scenic site. From here, one can gaze upon the municipalities of Macerata, Falerone, Treia, Civitanova Marche, Gualdo, Ripe San Ginesio, Sant'Angelo in Pontano, Penna San Giovanni, and Monte San Martino, as well as the hamlets of Passo San Ginesio, Pian di Pieca, and Santa Croce (all within the municipality itself), the hamlet of Sassotetto (Sarnano), and even catch sight of the Adriatic Sea and the wind turbines of Serrapetrona. Within the municipal territory flows the Fiastra River, known in Roman times as Flussorius, which empties into the Chienti River, along with the Entogge stream, a tributary of the Fiastra, and the Fiastrone, which runs near the hamlets of Morico, Morichelli, and Pian di Pieca. To mitigate water distribution challenges, the town is equipped with a large reservoir that addresses shortages when necessary.

=== Climate ===
Spanning from high mountains to plains, the vast territory of San Ginesio experiences a diverse climate. Summers are pleasantly mild and breezy, while winters can be harsh and snowy. The transitional seasons of spring and autumn are typically temperate and rainy, a pattern common to areas within the Sibillini Mountains National Park. On average, temperatures in San Ginesio hover around 5–6°C (41–43°F) in January, climbing to 23–24°C (73–75°F) in July, though variations occur. According to studies by the Park Authority, San Ginesio has a snowfall coefficient of 20–25%, and data from the ERA-5 atmospheric reanalysis system, conducted by the European Centre for Medium-Range Weather Forecasts, indicate that between 1979 and 2021, the average temperature rose by approximately 2°C (3.6°F) due to global warming. The municipality also has a weather station in Pian di Pieca, situated at 468 meters (1,535 feet) above sea level.

Climate data for San Ginesio, Italy (2020 data)
Month	Jan	Feb	Mar	Apr	May	Jun	Jul	Aug	Sep	Oct	Nov	Dec	Year
Record high °C (°F)	7.5 (45.5)	8.2 (46.8)	12 (54)	15.7 (60.3)	19.9 (67.8)	24.7 (76.5)	27.6 (81.7)	27.7 (81.9)	22.5 (72.5)	18.1 (64.6)	13 (55)	8.6 (47.5)	27.7 (81.9)
Daily mean °C (°F)	3.1 (37.6)	3.5 (38.3)	7 (45)	10.8 (51.4)	15.1 (59.2)	19.7 (67.5)	22.4 (72.3)	22.3 (72.1)	17.3 (63.1)	13.4 (56.1)	8.7 (47.7)	4.3 (39.7)	12.3 (54.2)
Record low °C (°F)	−0.6 (30.9)	−1 (30)	2.1 (35.8)	5.6 (42.1)	9.7 (49.5)	13.8 (56.8)	16.2 (61.2)	16.5 (61.7)	12.5 (54.5)	9.3 (48.7)	5 (41)	0.5 (32.9)	−1 (30)
Average precipitation mm (inches)	76 (3.0)	75 (3.0)	93 (3.7)	114 (4.5)	113 (4.4)	91 (3.6)	69 (2.7)	69 (2.7)	92 (3.6)	81 (3.2)	103 (4.1)	97 (3.8)	1,073 (42.3)
Average precipitation days	8	8	9	11	10	8	7	8	9	8	9	9	104
Average relative humidity (%)	82	80	76	74	72	66	59	61	71	79	82	83	74

== Origin of the name ==
The earliest known reference to the name appears as "castrum Sancti Genesij" in a document from 995. It is likely that the site, previously called "Avia" (from "a-via," linked to paganism) or "Esculanum," adopted the name San Ginesio following the arrival of the Franks under Charlemagne. Historically, other names have been attributed to the area, such as "Castrum" or "Castra" (meaning "fortified castle" due to its elevated position), "Cupra Montana" (related to the worship of the goddess Cupra), "Gineta" (tied to the goddess Gineta), and "Caput Castri" or "Oppidum" (both meaning "fortified castle").

The town’s patron saint is not Genesius of Arles nor Genesius of Brescello, as claimed by Gaetano Moroni, but rather Genesius of Rome, a mime martyred in 303 under Emperor Diocletian for refusing to mock the Christian sacrament of baptism in a performance. This act led to his recognition as the patron saint of theatrical performers. In 1601, Pope Clement VIII granted San Ginesio a relic of the saint—his left arm. However, since Genesius and the martyr Eleuterius were buried together, two "holy left arms" were sent to avoid confusion. These relics have since been preserved in the town’s main church, known as the Collegiata.

Before the establishment of the Italian Republic, which formalized the name’s spelling via a Decree of the President of the Republic in 1952, the name was not always written as the modern San Ginesio but often appeared as a single word, Sanginesio. For instance, "San Ginesio" is found in Gaetano Moroni’s dictionary (1846), while "Sanginesio" appears in the first volume of the Touring Club Italiano’s guide to Central Italy (1924).

== History ==
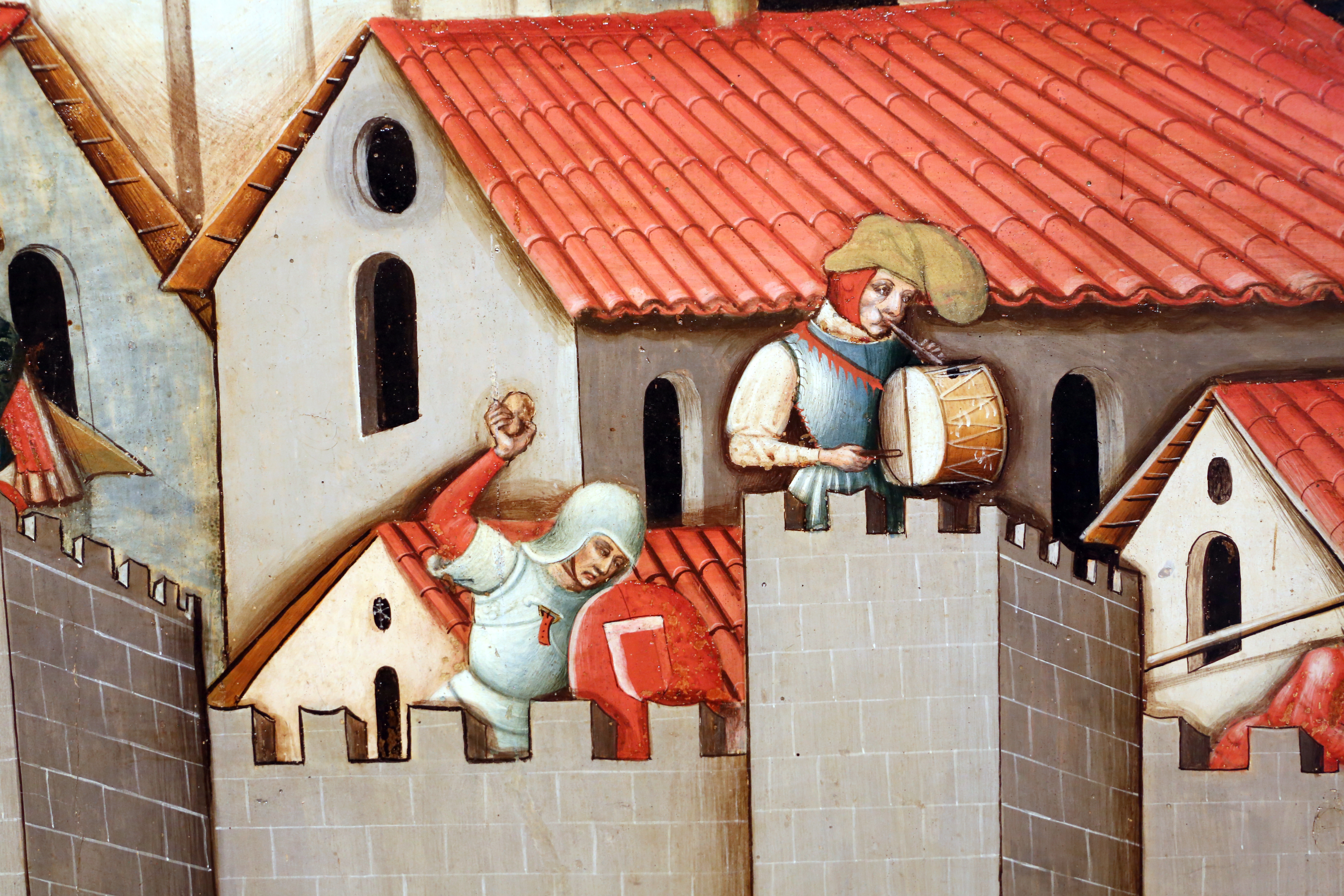
Detail of the Painting of Saint Andrew depicting San Ginesio soldiers during the Battle of Fornarina

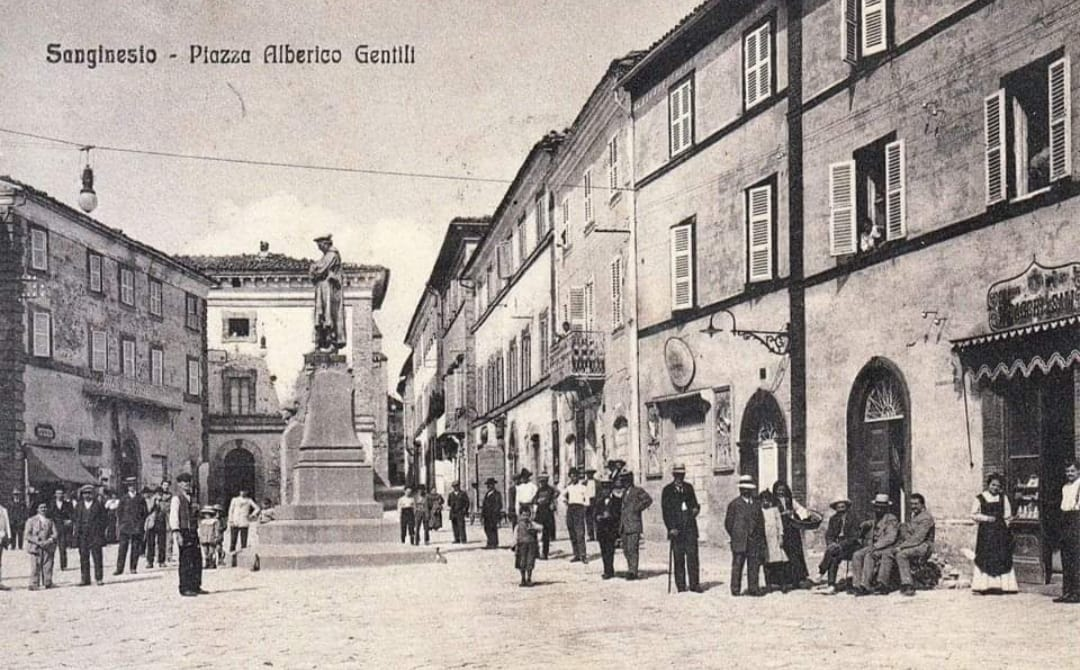
Piazza Alberico Gentili in the early 20th century

The history of San Ginesio begins around the 1st millennium BC, when the Senones settled in the region. With the arrival of the Romans, the Gallic Senones were defeated and subjugated between the 3rd century BC and the 1st century AD. San Ginesio features a Latin cross urban layout, encircled by an imposing set of castle walls still adorned with defensive features from that era, including battlements, archer slits, and towers. Following the fall of the Roman Empire, the Goths and Lombards—the latter ousted by Charlemagne—destroyed lowland settlements, forcing inhabitants to retreat to the inner hills, where nobles traditionally hunted. With the arrival of the Normans in the 10th century, the bourgeoisie decided to erect a fortification on the highest hill to control the valley passage below, thus giving rise to San Ginesio.

Managed as a Republic, the municipality became part of the Papal States under the Egidian Constitutions in the 14th century, authored by Cardinal Egidio Albornoz. It was governed by the Da Varano family of Camerino from 1355 to 1434. During this period, a significant rivalry emerged with the March of Fermo and Fermo, culminating in the Battle of Fornarina on 30 November 1377. The weakening of the Da Varano dynasty allowed the Milanese condottiero Francesco Sforza to subdue numerous Church territories in 1434, only for them to be liberated in 1443 by another mercenary captain, Niccolò Piccinino, in the service of the papacy. It was not until 1445 that San Ginesio peacefully acknowledged its allegiance to the Papal States.

Between 1450 and the election of Pope Pius II, three hundred Ginesians were exiled, accused of conspiring against the Pope. They sought refuge in Siena, where their exemplary conduct prompted Siena’s rulers to send ambassadors to San Ginesio to plead their case, securing their pardon. Accompanied by Sienese dignitaries, the exiles returned to the "Porta Picena," bearing a wooden crucifix as a peace offering and, as a gesture of harmony, the Sienese Statutes to guide the drafting of a new municipal code. Modeled on Siena’s framework and approved by Pope Pius II in 1458, the town council commissioned a Sienese painter to create the Painting of Saint Andrew, commemorating the historic battle.

In the 16th century, the Inquisition held several heresy trials in the town. The most notable involved Matteo Gentili, who fled with his son Alberico Gentili, later joined by his younger son Scipione Gentili. Both brothers gained renown as distinguished jurists.

During World War II, San Ginesio served as a strategic link in the Marche region due to its extensive territory along the SS 78. With the rise of the Italian Social Republic in 1943, the Vera Group, led by Girolamo Casà—who had escaped from Bari—began operating in the area, aiding local partisans. Numerous clashes occurred between Nazi-fascist forces, partisans, and civilians, resulting in skirmishes and summary trials. Notable incidents include the assault on an SS officer near Pian di Pieca on the night of 16–17 June, the killing of carabiniere Glorio Della Vecchia in Passo San Ginesio, and the murder of Father Sigismondo Damiani by the Brandenburgers at the San Liberato hermitage.

In 1969, San Ginesio was the site of a significant political agreement: Arnaldo Forlani and Ciriaco De Mita forged the "Pact of San Ginesio," aimed at revitalizing the Christian Democracy party and positioning them as its leaders. The pact emerged during a convention where Forlani became party secretary and De Mita his deputy, discussing a generational shift (from the second to the third generation) and the succession of Giuseppe Saragat. In 1972, following the agreement and approval for Giulio Andreotti’s centre-right government, Forlani was replaced by Amintore Fanfani as DC secretary at the subsequent congress, marking a victory for the older generation over the San Ginesio reformers. Amid the Tangentopoli scandals, the renewal the younger members envisioned proved unpredictable. The town suffered significant damage from the 1997 Umbria and Marche earthquake and the 2016–2017 Central Italy earthquakes.

=== Symbols ===
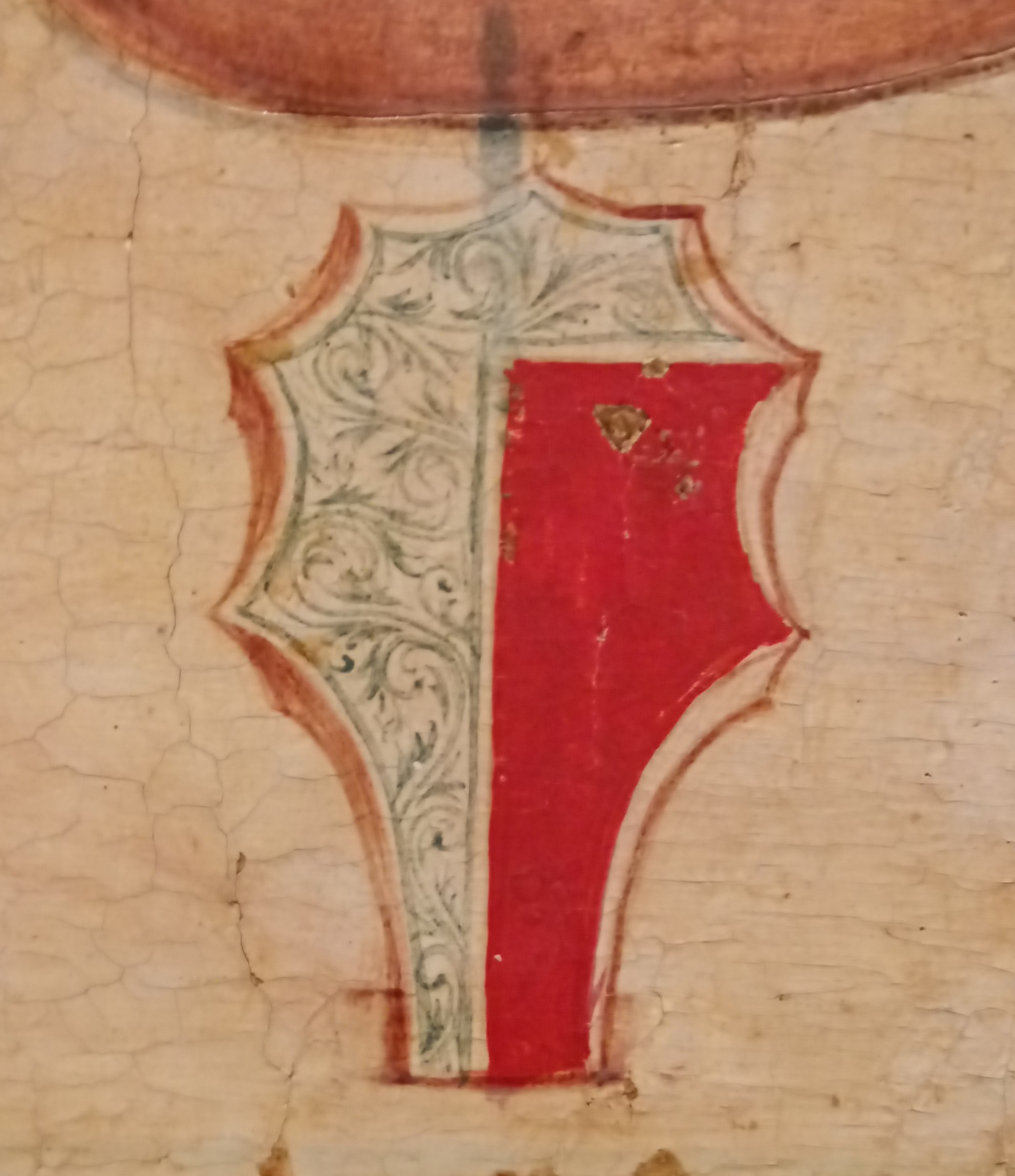
Coat of arms of San Ginesio in the 1498 painting Madonna Enthroned with Child, Saint Francis, and Blessed Liberato da Loro Piceno by Stefano Folchetti

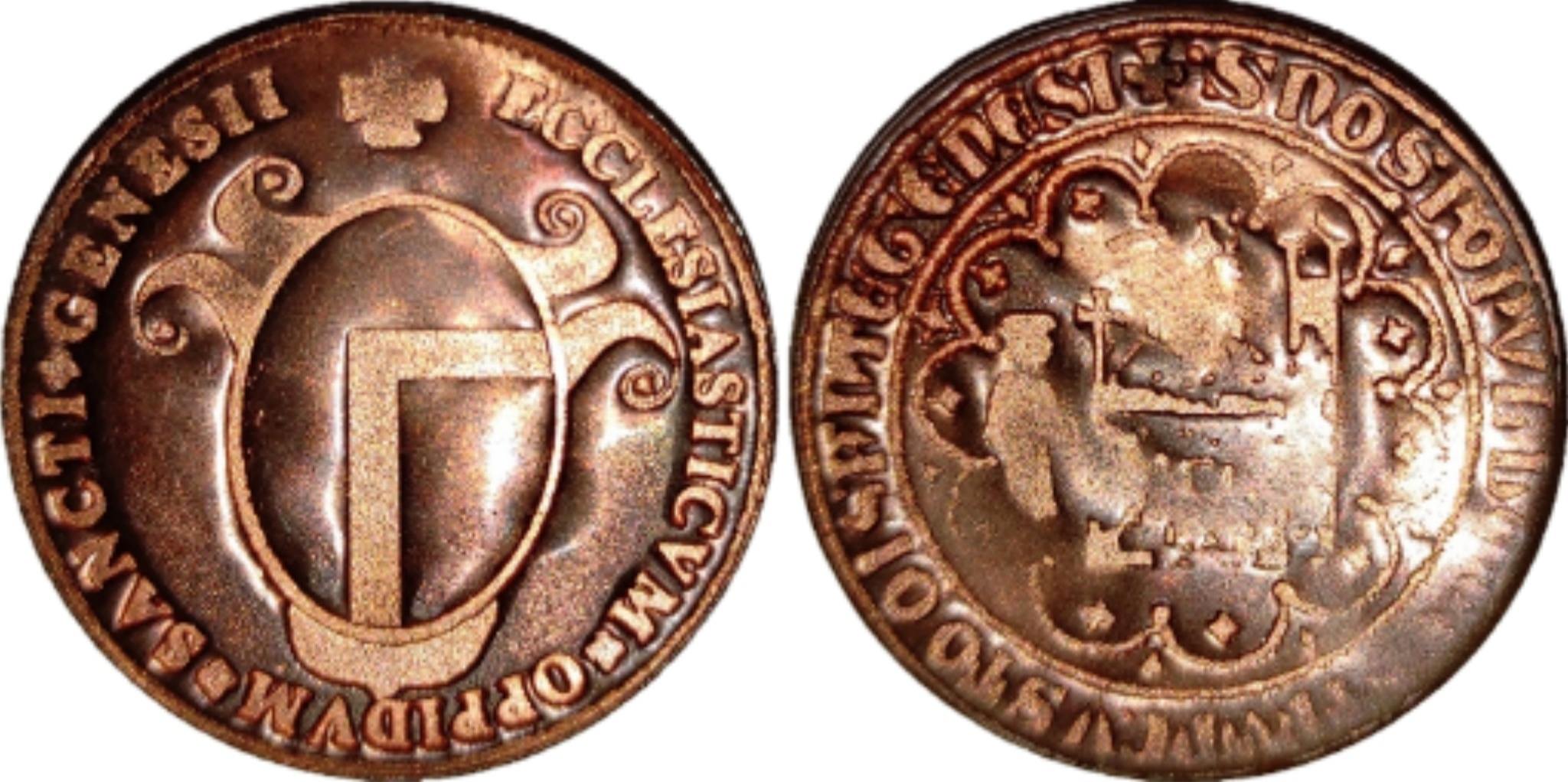
Modern copper reproduction of one of San Ginesio’s municipal seals, used until the 15th century

The current coat of arms of San Ginesio first appeared in the Middle Ages, with evidence preserved in three municipal seals. Local citizen Father Alfonzo Porzi of the T.O.R. from the Convent of San Francesco recounts an earlier emblem featuring a temple of Juno, later replaced with a cross symbolizing the triumph of Christianity over paganism.

In Volume XIX of Antichità Picene, edited by Giuseppe Colucci, Telesforo Benigni notes the existence of ancient circular seals, reproducing their images. One depicts a temple with a toga-clad figure beside it, possibly wearing a headpiece—interpreted by Benigni as the patron saint. Another shows the same temple with the figure to the left, topped by crossed keys, a symbol of papal authority. Both bear a Gothic inscription around the circular border: † S. Nos Populum vestrum custodi Sancte Genesi. Benigni translates this as "Saint Genesius, protect us, your people," interpreting "S." as an abbreviation for Sigillo (seal), while Morichelli Riccomanni reads it as Senatum (Senate), rendering it "Saint Genesius, protect our Senate, your people."

These were likely seals for official dispatches rather than a coat of arms. Intriguingly, some modern scholars suggest the toga-clad figure represents not the patron saint but Emperor Frederick II, a staunch ally of the Ginesians, who earned the title Defensores Imperii (Defenders of the Empire). This title persisted in municipal statutes to designate the highest officials—the four priors and the gonfalonier.

From the 15th century, possibly 1458, it is speculated that the populace ceased using these seals after Pope Pius II granted a coat of arms derived from his family emblem—a halved cross beneath Juno’s temple. This theory faltered, as the San Ginesio coat of arms, alongside those of Martin V, the Da Varano lords, the archpriest, and Bavarian master architect Enrico Alemanno, had already appeared in 1421 on the Pieve Collegiata’s façade and in significant 1464 parchments.

Further evidence lies in the Painting of Saint Andrew: the coat of arms is depicted twice—on the gate and porch of the castle walls framing the battle scene. It also appears in Stefano Folchetti’s 1498 painting Madonna Enthroned with Child, Saint Francis, and Blessed Liberato da Loro Piceno, commissioned by the Magistrate as an altarpiece for the San Liberato convent church.

Today, adhering to strict heraldic protocols, the emblem is recognized as a gamma cross, with its arms bent at different lengths to form the Greek letter "G," aligning with the initial of the patron saint.

During the Fascist era, the coat of arms was paired with a Samnite shield featuring the tricolor and fasces, or topped with the chief. The current design was submitted and approved by the Presidency of the Council of Ministers on 10 June 1951, and the modern gonfalon by the President of the Italian Republic on 1 July 1952. The blazon of the coat of arms reads:

Gules, a silver square reversed, issuing from the base. Exterior ornaments of a municipality.

— DPCM of 10.06.1951

The gonfalon’s blazon is:

Partitioned cloth of white and red, richly adorned with silver embroidery, charged with the municipal coat of arms and the centered silver inscription: Comune di San Ginesio. Metal parts and cords in silver. The vertical pole covered in velvet of white and red, with silver studs arranged spirally. The arrow bears the municipal coat of arms, and the shaft is inscribed with the name. Tricolor cravat and ribbons with national colors fringed in silver.

— DPR of 01.07.1952

== Monuments and places of interest ==
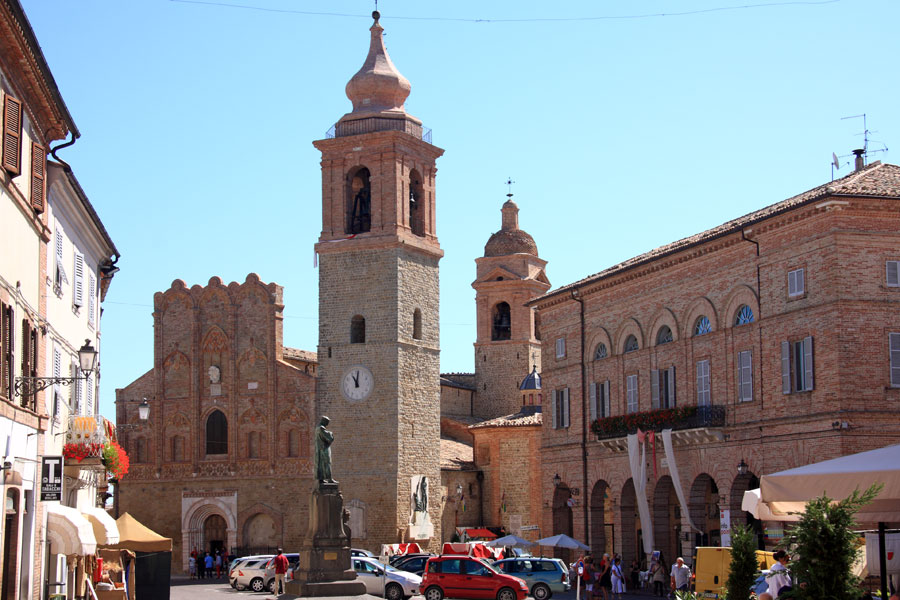
The central square with the Collegiata, loggia, and theater in the Defensorial Palace (right)

=== Religious architecture ===
==== Collegiate Church of Santa Maria Assunta ====
The Collegiate Church of Santa Maria Assunta stands as the town’s main church, located in Piazza Alberico Gentili. An initial structure was erected in the 11th century atop a Paleochristian chapel dedicated to Genesius of Rome, the town’s patron saint. As the settlement expanded eastward, the public administration ordered the construction of a larger church to accommodate the growing population. The building underwent numerous modifications and restorations, beginning in 1294 under Angelo Bussi and culminating in a significant enhancement of the façade’s upper section in 1421, commissioned to Enrico Alemanno. Thanks to Alemanno’s work, it remains the only example of Flamboyant Gothic architecture in the Marche region.

The interior, divided into three naves, retains the original Paleochristian crypt and features nine chapels along its sides—six on the right and three on the left. It houses various artworks, many by local artist Domenico Malpiedi, alongside paintings and frescoes by Pietro Alemanno, Cristoforo Roncalli, Federico Zuccari, Adolfo De Carolis, Simone De Magistris, and artists from the Perugino school. Other Ginesian contributors include Stefano Folchetti and Guglielmo Ciarlantini.

On September 8, 2017, the church was included in the "First Plan of Interventions on Artistic and Cultural Heritage," approved by then Commissioner for Reconstruction Vasco Errani just before his term ended. The structure sustained significant internal and external damage, particularly to its ceiling and masonry, from the earthquake, owing to its expansive layout and size.

Some scholars propose that beneath the church floor lie the remains of Pepin the Short and his wife Bertrada of Laon, while others suggest it is not the only building in San Ginesio bearing symbols and carvings linked to the Knights Templar.

==== Abbey of Santa Maria delle Macchie ====
The Abbey of Santa Maria delle Macchie, located in the hamlet of Macchie, is a former Benedictine monastery. Its construction date is uncertain, but extensive spolia from the nearby Roman city of Urbs Salvia suggests an origin between the 8th and 9th centuries. Construction techniques in the crypt from the 12th century indicate a foundation post-10th century. A document from 1171 mentions the abbey, with the earliest confirmed record dating to the 13th century.

==== Other religious buildings ====
- Auditorium Sant'Agostino (formerly Church of Sant’Agostino): The original Romanesque structure, dating to the 13th century, was dedicated to Mary Magdalene. Romanesque remnants are still visible in the walls despite continuous renovations. Restored in the 18th century between 1750 and 1756 by Carlo Antonio Sassi in Baroque style, the original façade was demolished and rebuilt. A 1799 earthquake damaged the structure, necessitating the demolition of its bell tower. After the unification of Italy, the convent and church, after the suppression of the Augustinian order, became property of the Kingdom of Italy.
- Church of the Madonna di Loreto: Built in the hamlet of Moline in the 18th century, specifically in 1625, it lies in ruins due to repeated earthquakes and is dedicated to the Madonna of Loreto.
- Church of the Nativity of Mary: Located in Poggio d’Acera, constructed between 1490 and 1510 in an isolated spot near the municipal borders, it was extensively rebuilt in the 20th century in the 16th-century architectural style. The exterior features rural decorations, such as windows near the entrance, with a façade marked by pilasters in brick and cornices accentuating the roofline. Painted with a late 16th-century work attributed to local artisans, its interior walls are plastered, and oval windows allow natural sunlight to illuminate the space.
- Church of Collina di Lagua
- Church of San Fabiano
- Church of San Francesco: Dating to the 11th century.
- Church of Santa Maria della Pietà, known as "della Scopa," now privately owned
- Church of San Giovanni Battista: Situated in the hamlet of Campanelle, constructed in 1936 in Romanesque style using materials from civil ruins, primarily bricks. Its pink stone rose window with a central cross displays the symbols of the Four Evangelists. The façade is adorned with numerous corbels above a terracotta cornice. The right side features a semicircular chapel and a bell tower with a cusp, while the left houses a sacristy built from varied materials. A stone above the sacristy entrance may originate from an earlier 19th-century church dedicated to John the Baptist. Though designed with a Latin cross plan, its arms are asymmetrical—the sacristy is square, and the chapel semicircular. The interior includes a vaulted crossing with three brick archivolts opening onto the nave and a fourth onto the raised presbytery, floored in marble. A second altar is located in the side chapel. After the Second Vatican Council in 1969, the church was renovated.
- Church of San Giacomo
- Church of San Gregorio Magno: Erected in late 13th century Romanesque style on land granted by the municipality, construction began officially on 4 June 1296 and concluded by the mid-14th century. During the Middle Ages, it was owned by the Benedictine Order of Piobbico-Sarnano. Before the 20th century, it underwent multiple restorations due to natural degradation—first in 1599, then in 1612, and again in 1898. In the 20th century, parts were demolished and rebuilt, such as the façade, reconstructed in Neo-Gothic style in 1905. The 1997 Umbria and Marche earthquake on 26 September 1997 caused minor damage, left unrestored due to lack of funding.

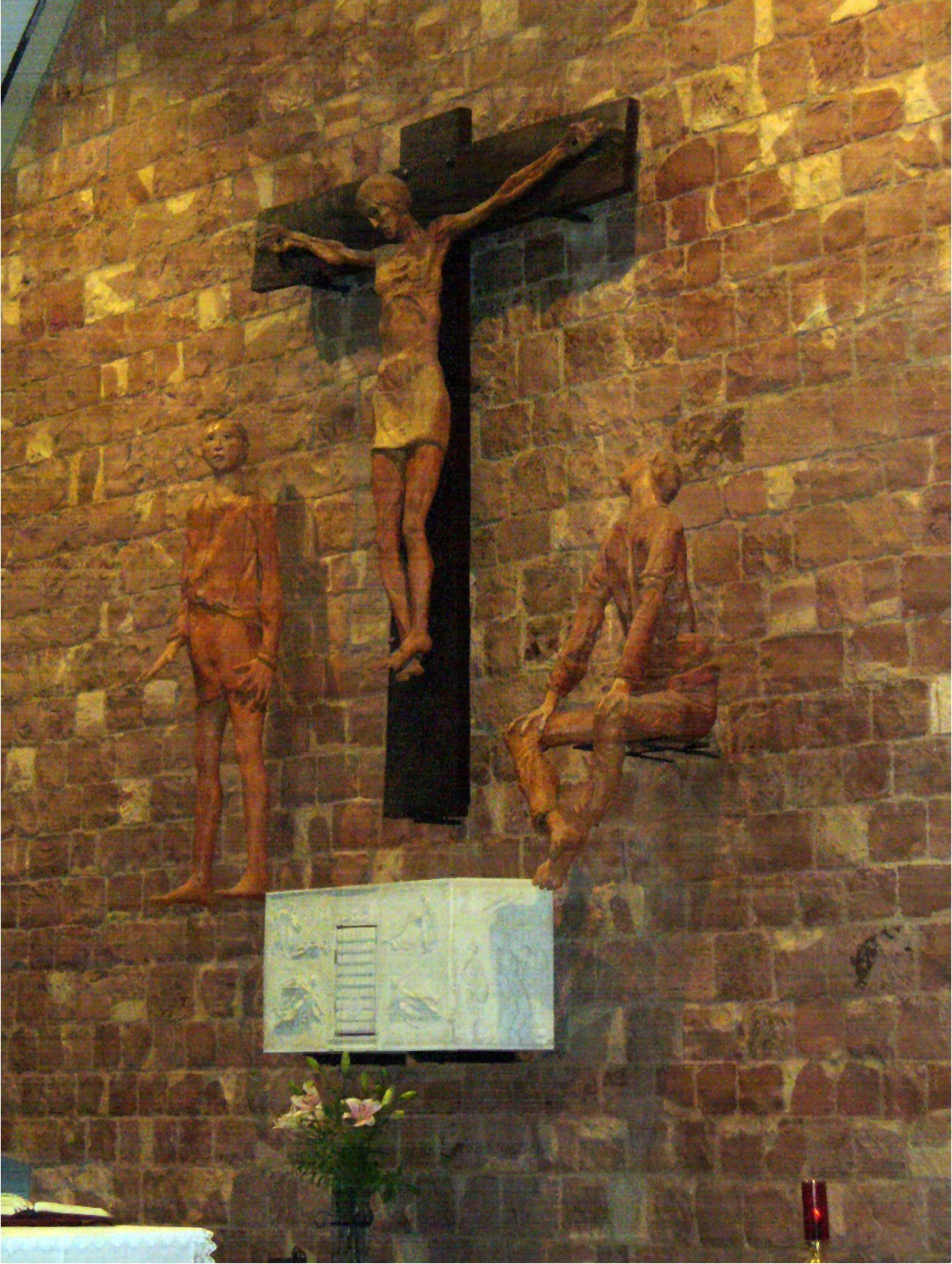
Arnaldo Mazzanti, Christ Crucified with Worshippers and Sacred Stories

- Church of San Michele Arcangelo: Built between 1958 and 1962 in the hamlet of Passo San Ginesio, consecrated in 1965, it is located between other buildings. The right side includes the parish house with facilities for the parish priest, linked to the church via a sacristy corridor. Constructed on a pink stone base with a hexagonal plan, it features a large triangular stained glass window tracing its perimeter. The interior showcases works by Milanese artist Arnaldo Mazzanti:
  - Christ Crucified with Worshippers, a terracotta sculpture, main altar;
  - Sacred Stories, 1970, tabernacle;
  - Madonna with Child, painting on wood;
  - Baptismal Font, 1970, reinforced concrete slabs.
- Church of San Quirico
- Church of San Savino
- Church of Santa Chiara
- Church of Santa Croce: Also known as the Church of the Holy Cross, its earliest record dates to 1069, making it the second-oldest church in the municipal territory. The current structure, from the 15th century, features a 1500 fresco attributed to Stefano Folchetti. The gabled façade includes a sandstone portal and a brick rose window; the bell tower, destroyed by an earthquake, is missing. The plastered interior and window placement allow natural light to illuminate the space. Restored in the 1980s and after the 1997 Umbria and Marche earthquake.
- Church of Santa Maria della Consolazione
- Church of Santa Maria in Selva
- Church of Santa Maria in Vepretis: A Roman Catholic church in Baroque style, built with simple bricks and decorated internally.
- Church of Torre di Morro
- Monumental Complex of Saints Thomas and Barnabas
- Aedicule of the Madonnetta della Fornarina
- Hermitage of San Liberato: Also known as the Sanctuary of San Liberato, built atop the Soffiano hermitage on the border between San Ginesio and Sarnano, dedicated to Saint Liberato da Loro Piceno, from whom it takes its name.
- Former Church of San Filippo Neri: Constructed in 1630 along the current Corso Scipione Gentili, it belonged to the Oratorians, though it was later transferred to the Order of Friars Minor before it was deconsecrated.
- Former Church of San Girolamo: Built in the late 16th century, only ruins remain.
- Former Church of San Michele
- Former Church of Sant’Anna
- Former Augustinian Convent: Dating to the 13th century, the current buildings stem from 1615 onward. The cloister contains frescoes depicting scenes from Augustine’s life, painted between 1630 and 1640 by Domenico Malpiedi.

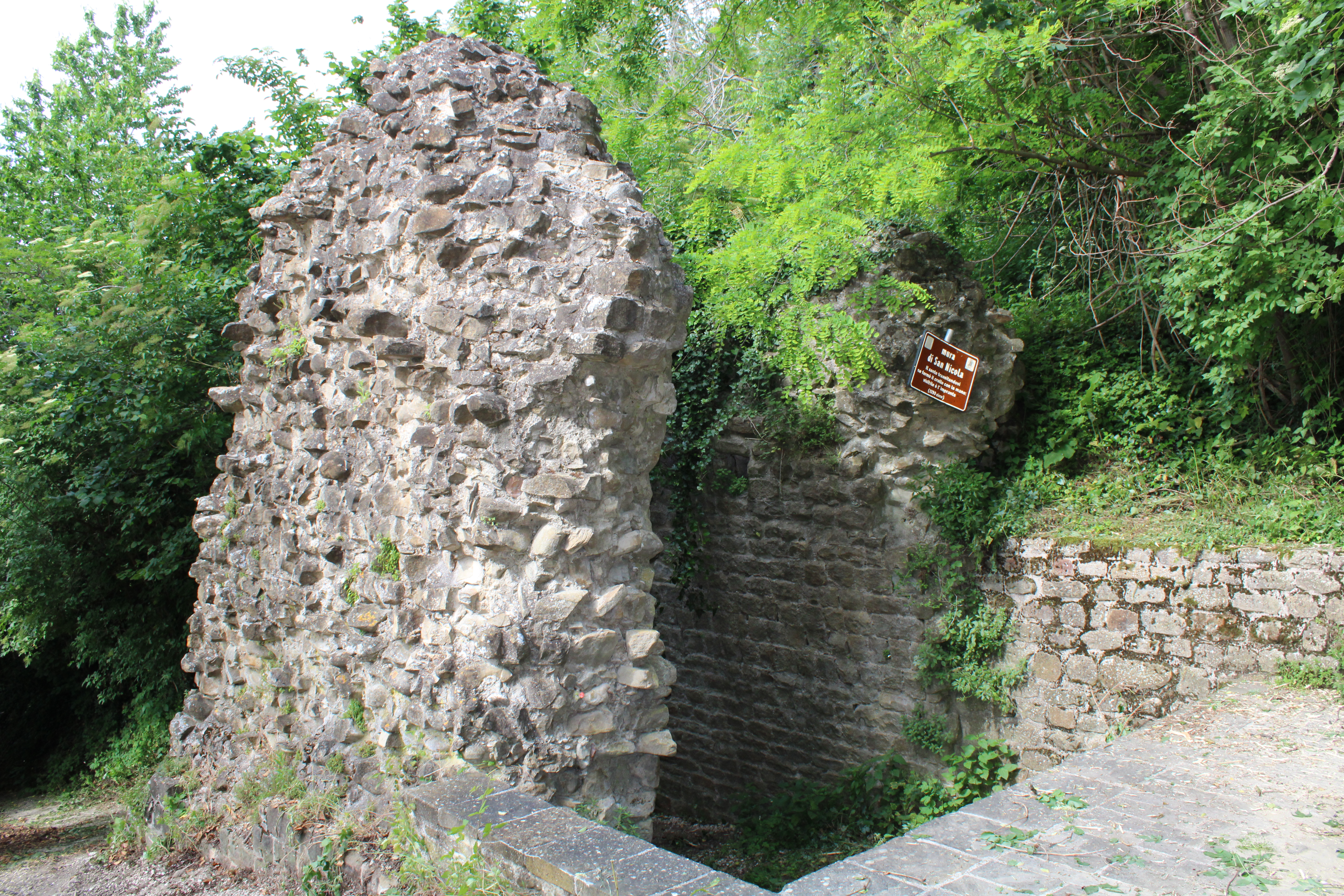
Walls of St. Nicholas

- Walls of St. Nicholas: Part of the town’s current castle walls, named after Saint Nicholas of Tolentino, who, legend has it, prevented their collapse by kneeling down.

=== Civil and military architecture ===
- Castle of Roccacolonnalta: A medieval castle once owned by the noble Brunforte family, now in ruins, located in the hamlet of Rocca. It may have housed a small chapel. Some hypothesize it was built by Crusaders of the Knights Hospitaller, given its resemblance to the Krak des Chevaliers in Syria.

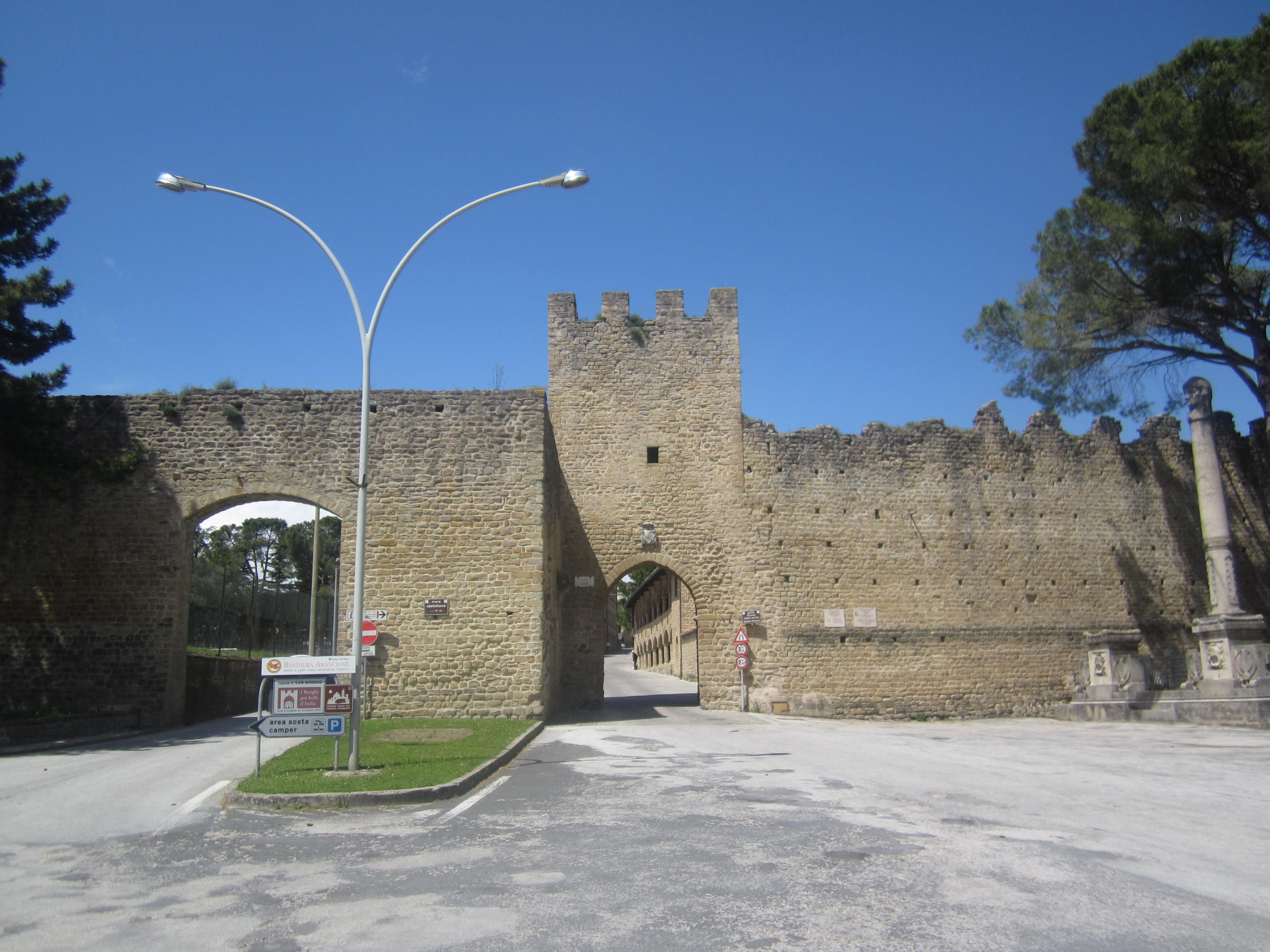
Mura castellane, Porta Picena, and a glimpse of the Ospedale dei Pellegrini

- Walls of San Ginesio: Among the most prominent monuments, construction of the San Ginesio walls began in 1308 (14th century) and took 150 years to complete. Built from sandstone, they nearly encircle the town, equipped with towers, turrets, and four city gates ("Porta Picena," "Porta Offuna," "Porta Ascarana," and "Porta Alvaneto"). Erected to defend against attacks, particularly from the Fermani.
- Pilgrims' Hospital: The Pilgrims’ Hospital, or San Paolo, built in 1295 (13th century) in Romanesque style, features a portico with low circular sandstone columns topped with leaf-clad capitals, a single row of polygonal loggias in terracotta doubled in 1457, and an upper brick arcade. An example of a domus hospitales, it was designed to shelter pilgrims traveling to Rome.
- Portella di Piazza
- Giacomo Leopardi Municipal Theater
- Civic Tower: Structurally joined to the Collegiata, a bulbous roof was added to this Romanesque civic tower in the 17th century. Municipally owned, it houses the Campana dell’Impero, a bronze bell designed by Guglielmo Ciarlantini, cast by the Campane Pasqualini foundry in 1937, and signed by Benito Mussolini. It commemorates Italy’s colonial success in Ethiopia (Italian Ethiopia) in 1935 and 1936. Damaged by the 1997 Umbria and Marche earthquake, it underwent safety measures following the 2016–2017 Central Italy earthquakes.
- Villa Piersanti

==== Palaces ====
- Palazzo Costantini: Featuring a private Baroque chapel and a canvas, its construction likely dates to the 17th century. Restored in the 19th century by the Costantini family, after whom it is named, and again in the 20th century by the Monti Azzurri Mountain Community. Damaged in the 1997 Umbria and Marche earthquake but not restored.
- Palazzo Cucchiari: Expanded in the 19th century, originally built by local artisans in the 11th or 13th century. Birthplace of Giovanni Cucchiari, a military gold medal recipient, commemorated with a plaque.
- Palazzo Galeotti (19th century)
- Palazzo Mazzabufi: Dating to the 18th century, it hosted notable figures including Giovanni Devoti (late 18th century), Sir Thomas E. Holland (1875 and 1888), Luigi Rava (September 1908), and Umberto II of Italy (August 1944).
- Palazzo Mazzabufi di Morichella (18th century)
- Palazzo Morichelli d’Altemps: Owned by the noble Morichelli-d’Altemps family, it contains an anonymous watercolor painting depicting the square of San Ginesio before 1850.
- Palazzo Olivieri: A modestly proportioned building from the early 19th century, commissioned by the Onofri family. Its exterior features numerous terracotta-framed windows and a portal with a papal wrought iron blazon requested by Pius VII, while the interior boasts Pompeian floral motifs or allegorical designs by local painter Galassi.
- Palazzo Onofri (19th century)
- Palazzo Onofri-Olivieri: A noble palace from the 18th century, designed by Giuseppe Lucatelli for the Onofri family, adorned with decorations by Ginesian painter Gaetano Galassi. Partially rebuilt in 1964, it sustained damage in the 1997 earthquake.
- Palazzo Ragoni (1169)
- Palazzo Tamburelli-Gilberti (17th–18th century)

=== Parks and monuments ===
- Colle Ascarano: Near Porta Ascarana, this park lacked decoration, vegetation, or structures in the early 20th century, as evidenced by historical photos. This was intentional, as it once hosted the Ascarano family’s castle. After their failed attempt to restore Da Varano rule by opening the town’s gates, the castle was razed, and a decree banned construction on the site. Today, it offers views from the Gran Sasso to the Monte Conero, including the Sibillini Mountains. The Nuova Rivista Misena of Arcevia described the panorama in April 1889:

A hundred pleasant hills and a hundred views of cities and castles smiling down at you, and villas and winding roads to be seen again and again.

- Remembrance Park: Also called the "Park of Remembrance," located outside Porta Picena, it honors those fallen in World War I and World War II. Built between 1925 and 1930 by Guglielmo Ciarlantini, it retains Fascist-era entrance decorations. Designed as a basilica, Its maritime pines have a symbolic meaning: the outer pines represent war deaths, the inner and apse pines represent combat deaths, those around the altar represent decorated soldiers, and its two cypresses symbolize San Ginesio’s two gold medals of military valor.

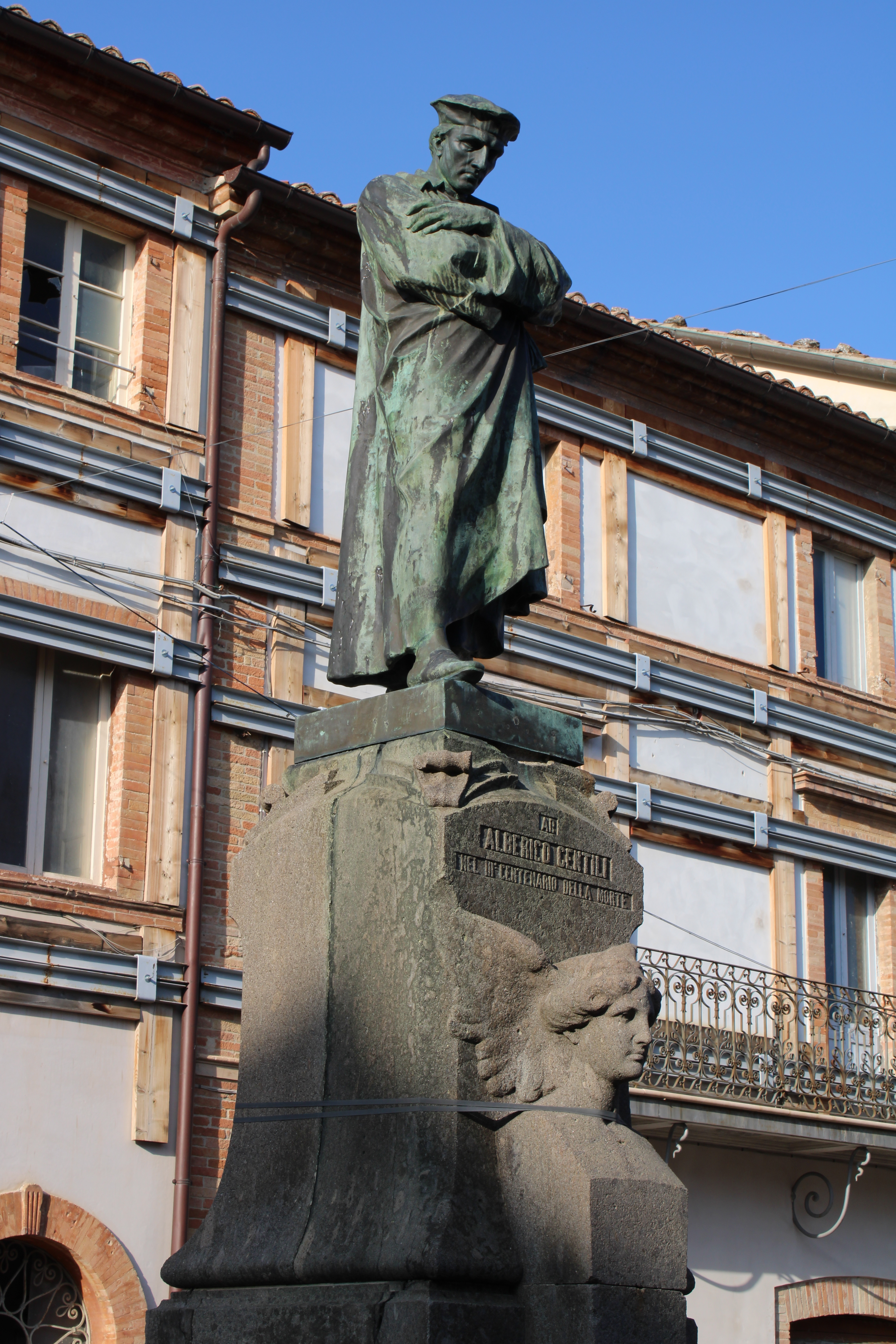
Statue of Alberico Gentili

- Statue of Alberico Gentili: A bronze statue by sculptor Giuseppe Guastalla from 1905, located in the town square, dedicated to Alberico Gentili and facing Corso Scipione Gentili.
- Plaque to the Martyrs of Liberty: In Piazza Alberico Gentili, this marble plaque with raised borders honors the Vera Group, partisans active during World War II who resisted Nazi-fascist atrocities. Erected for the 60th anniversary of the town’s liberation on 20 June 1944.
- Plaque to the Martyrs of San Ginesio: Mounted on the castle walls and unveiled on 9 August 1964, it commemorates World War II Ginesian martyrs.
- Plaque to Sigismondo Damiani: Dedicated to the military friar who preached at the sanctuary in San Liberato during the world wars, this travertine plaque with iron supports features a bronze relief of his profile bust.
- Slab to Concetto Focaccetti: A marble slab honoring the lieutenant of the Alpini, killed in the Balkans during World War II.
- Slab to Glorio della Vecchia: Located on Via Raffaele Merelli, this slab commemorates the killing of the soldier in Passo San Ginesio in 1944.

== Society ==
=== Demographic evolution ===
Historical population

Year	Pop.	±%
1861	6,050	—
1871	6,418	+6.1%
1881	6,567	+2.3%
1901	7,250	+10.4%
1911	6,838	−5.7%
1921	7,377	+7.9%
1931	7,674	+4.0%
1936	7,939	+3.5%

Year	Pop.	±%
1951	7,801	−1.7%
1961	6,707	−14.0%
1971	5,071	−24.4%
1981	4,280	−15.6%
1991	4,031	−5.8%
2001	3,799	−5.8%
2011	3,644	−4.1%
2021	3,114	−14.5%

Source: ISTAT

Due to the 2016–2017 Central Italy earthquakes, some Ginesians, from both the town and its hamlets, were forced to abandon their homes and relocate elsewhere.

=== Ethnicities and foreign minorities ===
As of 31 December 2019, according to ISTAT data, San Ginesio had 269 foreign residents, comprising 8.2% of the population. The largest group (68.40%) hailed from Europe, with the smallest (6.69%) from the Americas. The most represented nationalities were:

- United Kingdom – 63 (23.4%)
- Romania – 47 (17.5%)
- India – 36 (13.4%)

=== Traditions and folklore ===
- The "Battle of Fornarina" is an annual medieval reenactment held in August, commemorating the thwarted surprise attack by the Fermani on 30 November 1377, foiled by a baker’s warning.
- The "Fornarina Prize," established in 1998 by the Confraternity of the Sacred Heart of Jesus, is an annual award honoring a woman distinguished in society, named after the baker who averted the 1377 assault. Recipients include Laura Boldrini (2003), Teresa Petrangolini (2006), Renata Pisu (2010), Franca Bimbi (2013), and Roberta Preziotti (2016).
- The "Ginesio Fest" coincides with Medievalia, celebrating the patron saint, locally known as Lucio Ginesio. Initiated in 2020 by the Promoting Committee, with Remo Girone as president, Vinicio Marchioni and Milena Mancini as artistic directors, and Mayor Giuliano Ciabocco, it awards a national prize for acting (San Ginesio Award). Organized as a sign of hope after the 2016–2017 Central Italy earthquakes and the COVID-19 crisis, it honors the best actress and actor, selected by a jury. Since the 12th century, festivities honored the Roman saint, but with Andrew of Perugia, additional feast days were added.
- The "Return of the Exiles" is a triennial medieval reenactment recounting the exile of three hundred Ginesians between 1450 and 1460, accused of sedition to restore the monarchy. Finding refuge in Siena and serving in its civic guard with distinction, they prompted Sienese ambassadors to plead their case. Accompanied by Sienese dignitaries, the three hundred citizens returned to their homeland and donated to the town the crucifix, still venerated today in the collegiate church, as a testimony to the commitment to peace and to the statutes in force in Siena, in order to re-establish the law.
- The "Medievalia", which takes place during Ferragosto, begins with the re-enactment of the "Battle of Fornarina". The village revives the medieval atmosphere with elaborate decorations and taverns. The Palio, held almost every evening, pits athletes from the four Ginesian districts against each other in contests such as archery, crossbow shooting, running and sword fighting, the Ring Palio (nocturnal joust on August 13) and the Pacca Palio (joust on the afternoon of August 15).

=== Institutions, entities, and associations ===
- Civil Hospital: This structure, originally inhabited by the Cistercians before the 15th century, was expanded in the 17th century for military purposes. It began as one of the possessions of the Catholic clergy, specifically the convent associated with the Church of Santa Maria in Vepretis. Before the dawn of the 19th century, during the Roman Republic, the convent received new endowments, a practice continued by the Papal States following the Napoleonic liberation. However, with the establishment of the Kingdom of Italy and the state’s appropriation of ecclesiastical properties, the convent was stripped of its assets and repurposed into a hospital, complete with a school and an orphanage, while the religious order residing there was dissolved. Throughout the 20th century, it underwent significant renovations, including new flooring and the addition of new wings. In 1972, the hospital merged with the civil hospital of Sarnano through the creation of the Sarnano and San Ginesio Hospital Consortium. The official unification of the two facilities occurred under regional law no. 36 of May 19, 1975, though it became operational in 1976. From that point, the two hospitals were collectively known as the "United Hospitals of Sarnano and San Ginesio." From 1981 to 1988, it was managed by the ASUR no. 19 of Tolentino, after which it was closed and transformed into a Residential Healthcare Facility (RSA). Some departments and outpatient clinics continued to operate under the supervision of the regional ASUR.

== Culture ==
=== Education ===
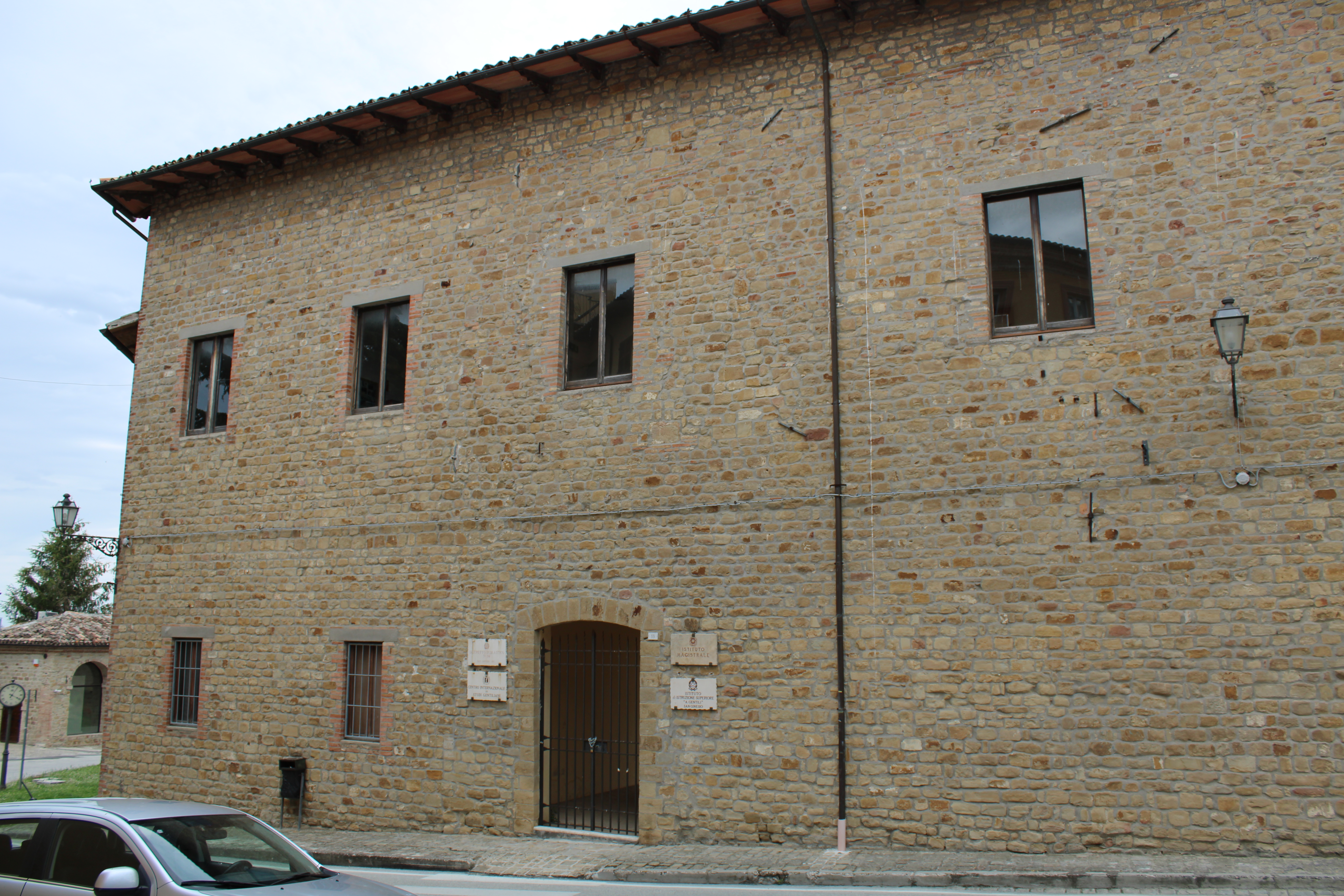
Convent of the Augustinians, the main seat of the IIS Alberico Gentili and the CISG.

In San Ginesio, the International Center for Gentilian Studies was founded in 1981, a center of legal and humanistic culture that celebrates the memory of the jurist Alberico Gentili, whose statue stands in the center of the city's main square.

==== Libraries ====
The Scipione Gentili Municipal Library, with 12,000 volumes, is located in the north wing of the Town Hall and is managed by volunteers and the municipality itself.

==== Schools ====
The municipality serves as the primary location for the "Vincenzo Tortoreto" Comprehensive Institute. This institute encompasses four kindergartens, four primary schools, and two lower secondary schools, distributed across the municipalities of San Ginesio, Sant'Angelo in Pontano, and Ripe San Ginesio. The area also hosts the Alberico Gentili Institute of Higher Education, named after the jurist Alberico Gentili. This institute includes a scientific high school located in Sarnano. Additionally, the municipality is home to a branch of the Renzo Frau State Professional Institute for Industry and Handicraft, which focuses on furniture design and mechanics.

=== Museums ===
- The town features the Scipione Gentili Museum and Art Gallery, housed in the former Church of San Sebastiano. Inside, alongside a variety of artistic and architectural works, is the altarpiece of the Battle of Fornarina, now known as the Saint Andrew Painting. After the earthquakes of 2016 and 2017, the structure remains unusable.
- The Latin phrase Hoc Opus refers to an art exhibition titled Hoc Opus. Return to Beauty, featuring works retrieved after the earthquake from the municipal art gallery and local Ginesian churches, returned to the municipality after four years.

=== Media ===
==== Radio ====
Around 1970, after the municipality installed the first free radio antenna in its territory, the inaugural radio station, Radio Zona L (RZL), was established, though it was later discontinued. The station’s name reflects that of the Monti Azzurri Mountain Community, which oversees the "Zone L" area of the region.

=== Music ===
In 1989, the Giulio Bonagiunta Choir was founded, named after the 16th-century Ginesian musician Giulio Bonagiunta.

=== Cuisine ===
- The wine "San Ginesio" holds a Denominazione di Origine Controllata (DOC) designation: "San Ginesio Rosso" is crafted from Sangiovese, Grenache, Cabernet Franc, Cabernet Sauvignon, Merlot, and Ciliegiolo grapes. "San Ginesio Spumante" is made solely from Grenache. This DOC wine category was established by a decree issued on July 25, 2007.
- A traditional Christmas dessert is pizza with walnuts or figs.
- A signature dish, especially during the Palio, is the polenta, officially named "Polentone di San Ginesio." This polenta is officially registered with the CCIAA of Macerata.
- A typical salami of the area and the hinterland of Macerata is the ciauscolo.

== Anthropic geography ==
=== Hamlets ===
The municipality comprises 23 hamlets: Botondolo, Campanelle, Cardarello, Casa Gatti, Cerqueto, Colle, Collina, Ficcardo, Fontepeschiera, Macchie, Maregnano, Morichella, Morico, Passo San Ginesio, Pian di Pieca (Pieca and Santa Maria di Pieca), Rocca Colonnalta, San Liberato, Santa Croce, Santa Maria in Alto Cielo, Torre di Morro, Vallato, and Vallimestre.

==== Passo San Ginesio ====
Passo San Ginesio emerged in 1911 with the founding of the Autolinee SASP company, which built its offices and vehicle depot along the SS 78. During World War II, the hamlet was a site of roundups, and in 1944, it witnessed the deaths of three partisans. Since 1970, the residents of Passo (Ginesians from this hamlet) have been engaged in an indirect feud with the inhabitants of the historic village.

== Economy ==
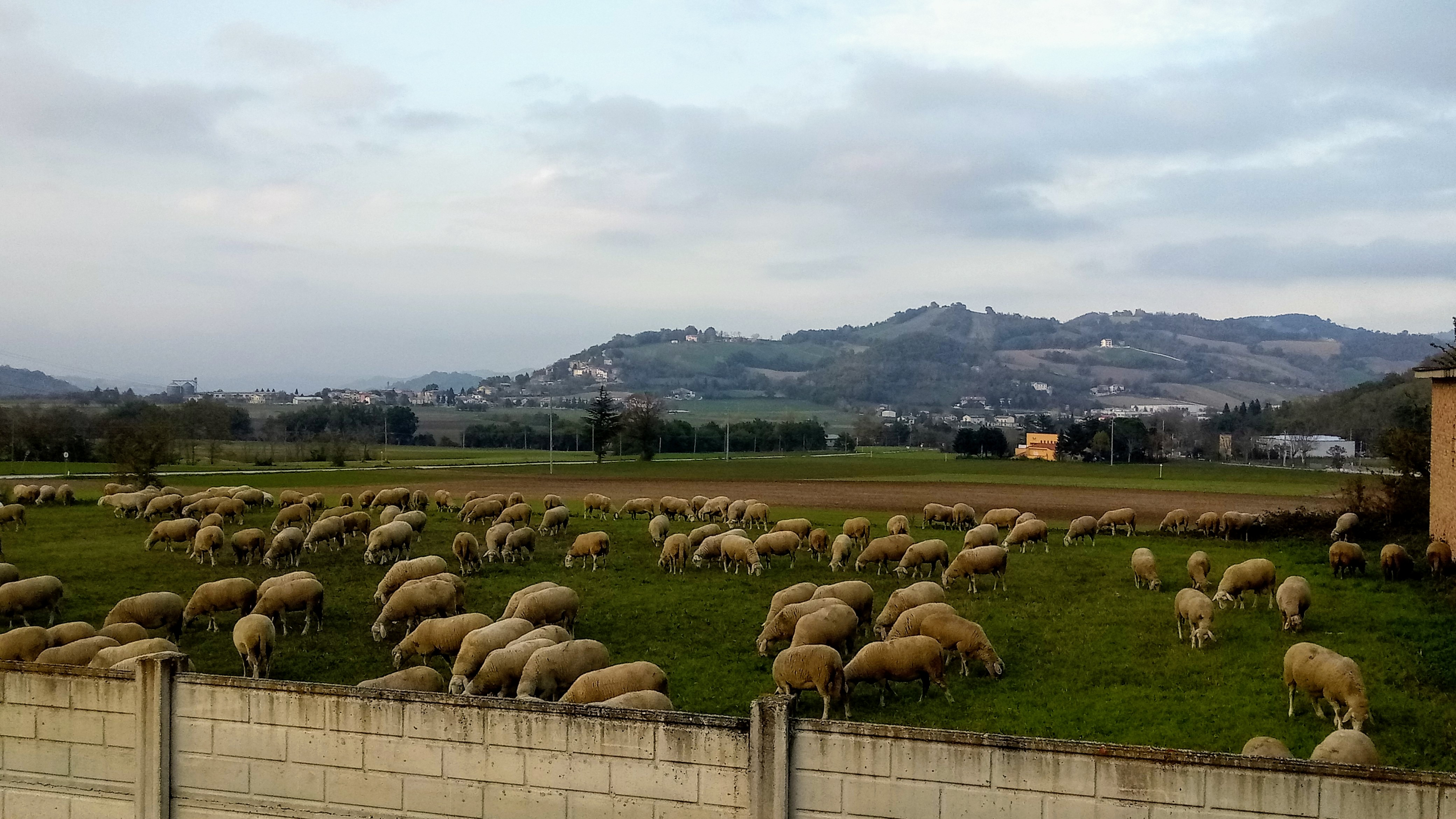
Sheep grazing near Pian di Pieca

=== Agriculture ===
In the municipality of San Ginesio, particularly in its hilly and flat zones, it is common to find plantations of barley, wheat, sunflowers, alfalfa, maize, vineyards, and olive groves.

=== Crafts ===
Among the most traditional, widespread, and active economic activities are artisanal crafts, such as the renowned art of weaving aimed at producing rugs and other items of high artistic value. In antiquity, the municipality was celebrated, even at a European level, for its thriving trade.

=== Industry ===
Industries within the municipality are primarily located in the PIP Zone (Plan for Production Facilities) of the Pian di Pieca hamlet and along the SS 78. This includes the food, textile and plastics industries. Elsewhere in the municipal territory, various mining industries can be found. Numerous companies, situated on the outskirts of the historic town and in the hamlets of Passo San Ginesio and Pian di Pieca, have either closed or gone into bankruptcy due to the Great Recession.

=== Tourism ===
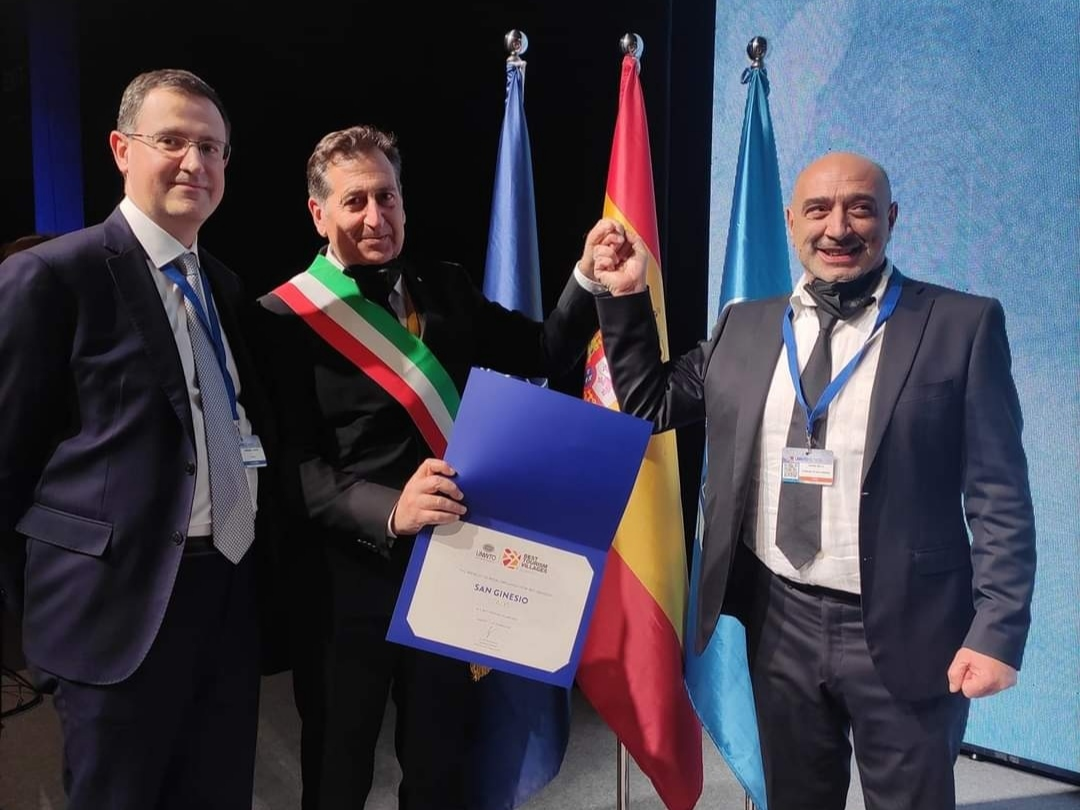
Mayor Ciabocco and Deputy Mayor Belli receive the World Tourism Organization award

Located near the Sibillini Mountains, San Ginesio is part of the Most Beautiful Villages in Italy association and has been awarded the Orange Flag by the Touring Club Italiano, the Yellow Flag by the Italian Touring Campers Association, and is one of the municipalities adhering to the Municipality Friendly to Itinerant Tourism. On December 2, 2021, it was recognized as Italy’s "Best Tourist Village of 2021" in Madrid by the World Tourism Organization (UNWTO) of the United Nations. During the 1980s and 1990s, San Ginesio was a highly sought-after destination for tennis professionals as a location for summer retreats and training.

== Infrastructure and transport ==
San Ginesio lies along the Provincial Road 45 Faleriense, which connects it, including the Pian di Pieca hamlet, to the Provincial Road 502 of Cingoli. Outside the town, the SP 45 intersects with the Provincial Road 126, linking it to Tolentino. The Passo San Ginesio hamlet marks the junction of the SP 45 and the SS 78, and it is where Autolinee SASP—a member of the Contram union, an Italian public transport company—has its administrative headquarters, workshop, and warehouses.

== Administration ==
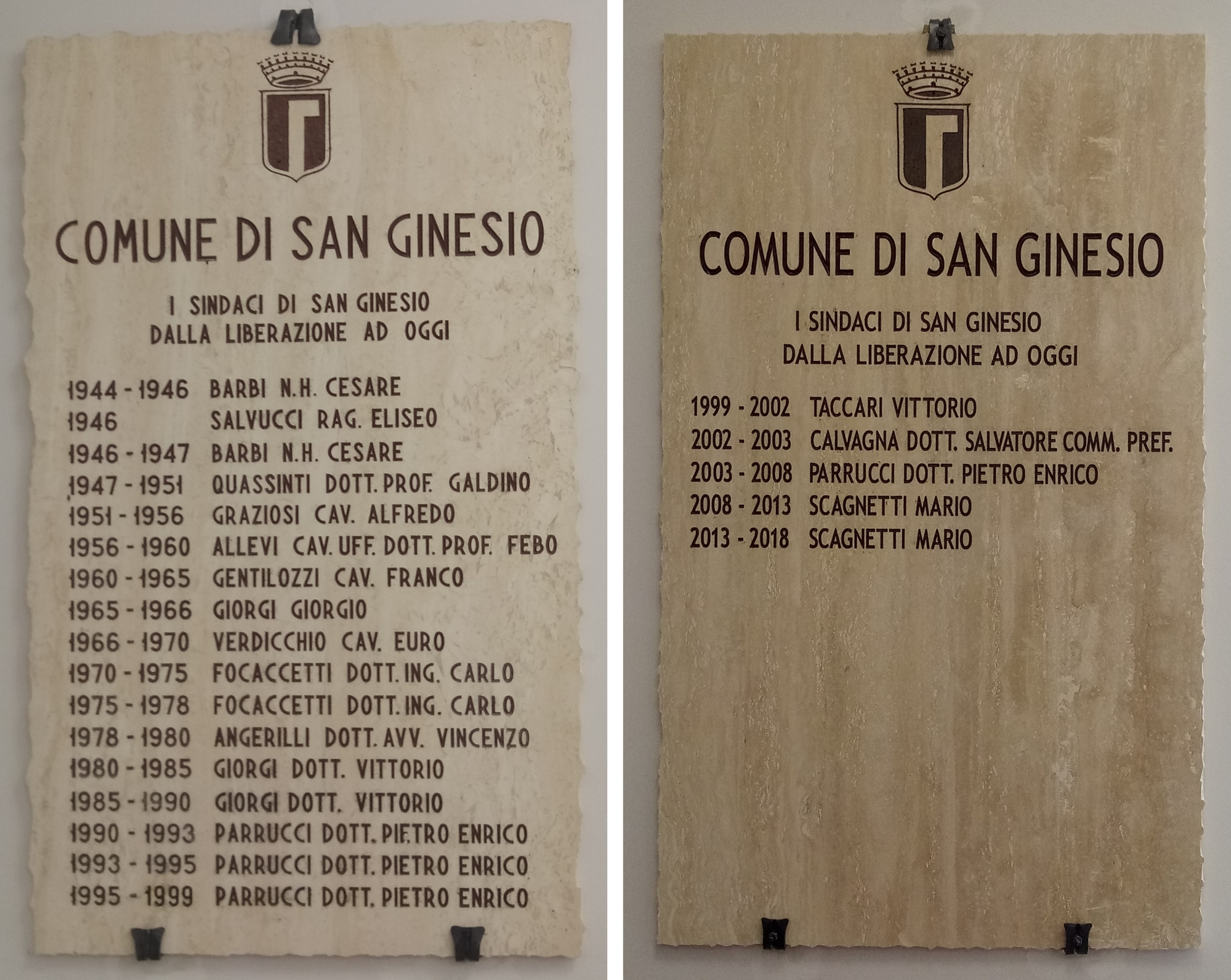
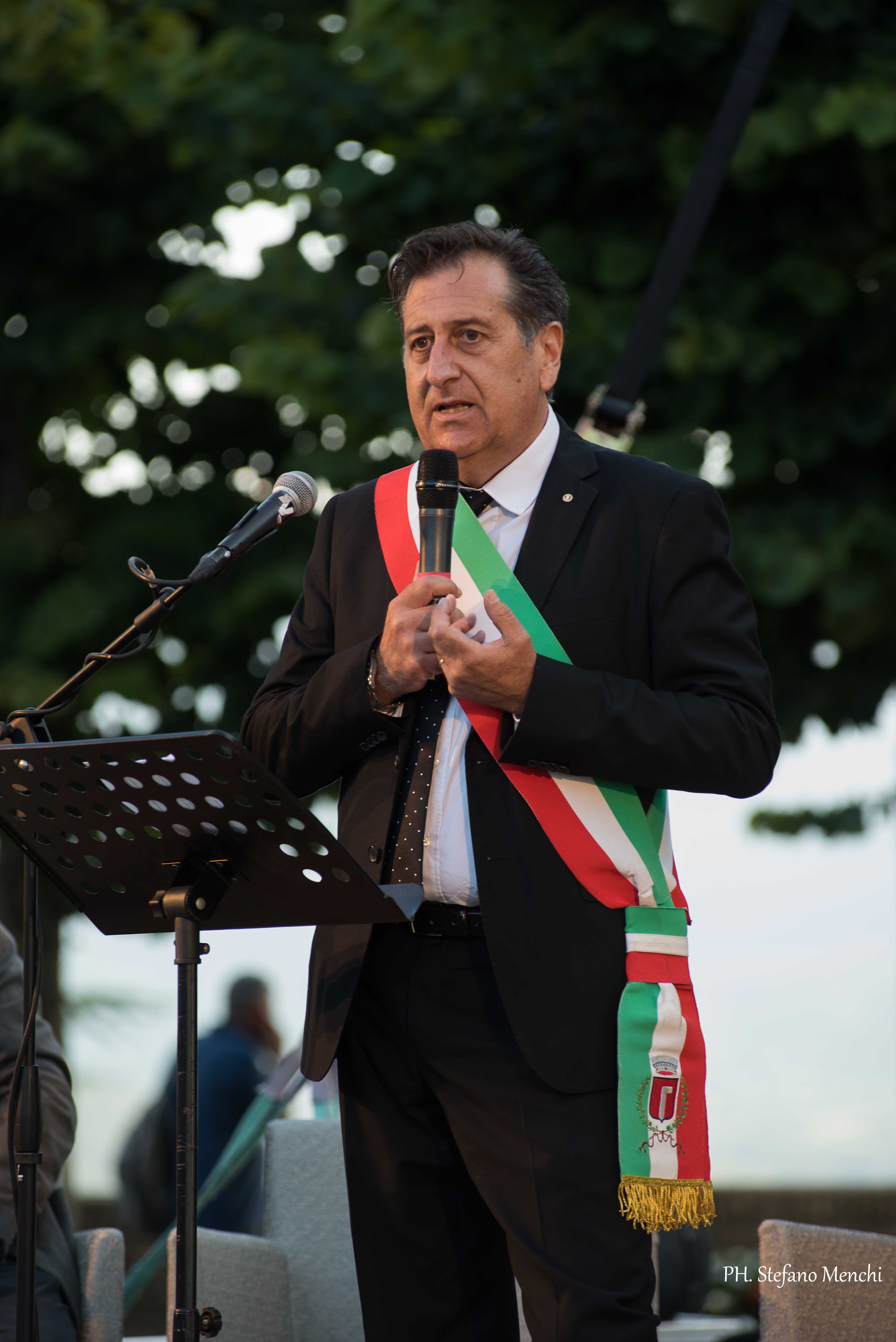
Mayors of San Ginesio and the current mayor, Giuliano Ciabocco
- The municipality is part of the Most Beautiful Villages in Italy network and holds the tourism-environmental Orange Flag designation awarded by the Touring Club Italiano. In addition to these accolades, it bears the Yellow Flag from the Italian Touring Campers Association, is a member of the Municipality Friendly to Itinerant Tourism, and has been named one of the "Best Tourist Villages" by the UNWTO.
- The municipal territory hosts the headquarters of the current Unione Montana dei Monti Azzurri (formerly Comunità montana Monti Azzurri), a community that supports elderly and disabled individuals in need of assistance.
- In the Pian di Pieca hamlet, the municipality maintains a helipad operated by the Italian Civil Protection Department.
- The municipal territory features an ultra-high voltage electrical grid (380 kV).
- In terms of healthcare, San Ginesio was part of District 9 of Territorial Zone no. 3 of Macerata under the Local Health Authority of Marche (abbreviated Z.T. no. 3 - A.S.U.R. Marche). Following regional law no. 19 of August 8, 2022, which dissolved the ASUR and established Local Health Authorities (AST), it has been part of the AST of Macerata since January 1, 2023.
- Ecclesiastically, San Ginesio is one of the six vicariates of the Archdiocese of Camerino-San Severino Marche, encompassing the municipalities of Belforte del Chienti, Caldarola, Camporotondo di Fiastrone, Cessapalombo, Ripe San Ginesio, Sarnano, and Serrapetrona.

== Sister cities ==
- Siena
- Koper
- Carpenedolo
- Changshu
- Chieve

== Sports ==
The municipality is home to the San Ginesio Calcio football club, which has competed in regional amateur leagues.

== See also ==
- Stefano Folchetti

== Bibliography ==
- Gazzera, Ermelinda (1915). Santo Ginesio et lo suo antiquo archivio, sec. XII-sec. XVIII [Saint Ginesio and Its Ancient Archive, 12th–18th Centuries] (in Italian). Stab. tipografico "Francesco Filelfo".
- Allevi, Febo; Crispini, Giuseppe (1969). San Ginesio [San Ginesio] (in Italian). Ravenna: Angelo Longo Editore.
- Porzi, Alfonso (1986a). San Ginesio terrazza delle Marche, potente castello medievale piceno [San Ginesio, Terrace of the Marche, Mighty Medieval Picene Castle] (in Italian). Vol. 1.
- Istituto comprensivo Vincenzo Tortoreto (1997). Sanginesio et lo suo antiquo archivio [Sanginesio and Its Ancient Archive] (in Italian). San Ginesio: Comune di San Ginesio.
- Salvi, G. Can. (1889). Memorie storiche di Sanginesio (Marche) in relazione con le terre circonvicine [Historical Memories of Sanginesio (Marche) in Relation to the Surrounding Lands] (in Italian). Camerino: Tipografia Savini.
- Severini, Marinangelo (1581) [16th century]. Historiae Genesinae [Histories of Ginesio] (in Latin). Translated by Francesco Ciampaglia. Municipal Historical Archive.
