= Colmurano =

- Comune
- Comune di Colmurano
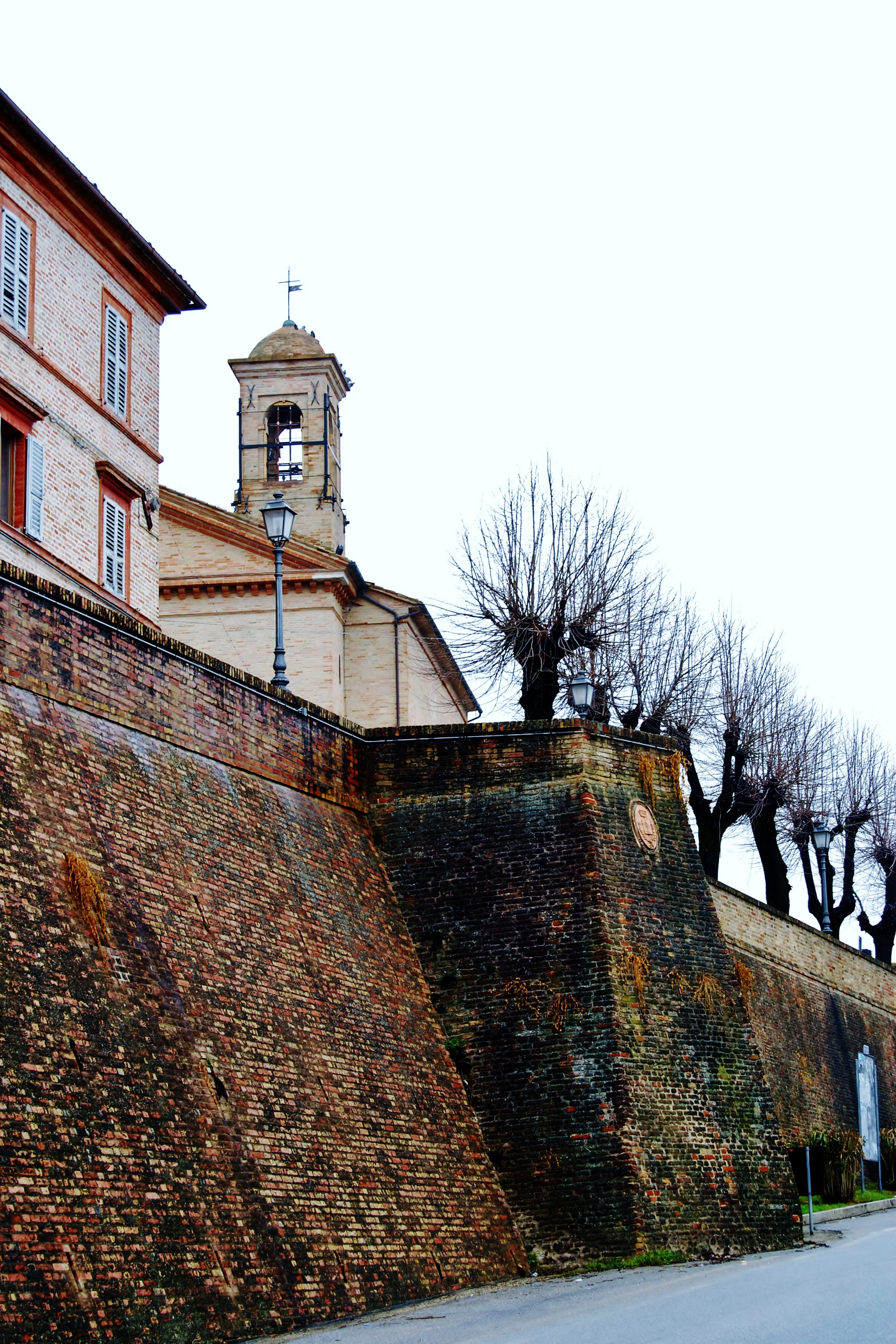

- Location within Italy Location within Marche
- Coordinates: 43°10′N 13°21′E
- Country: Italy
- Region: Marche
- Province: Macerata (MC)

Government
  - Mayor: Ornella Formica

Area
  - Total: 11.2 km^{2} (4.3 sq mi)
- Elevation: 414 m (1,358 ft)

Population (Dec. 2004)
  - Total: 1,255
  - Density: 112/km^{2} (290/sq mi)
- Demonym: Colmuranesi
- Time zone: UTC+1 (CET)
  - Summer (DST): UTC+2 (CEST)
- Postal code: 62020
- Dialing code: 0733

Colmurano is a comune (municipality) in the Province of Macerata in the Italian region of Marche, located about 50 kilometres (31 mi) southwest of Ancona and about 15 kilometres (9 mi) southwest of Macerata.

Colmurano borders the following municipalities: Loro Piceno, Ripe San Ginesio, San Ginesio, Tolentino, Urbisaglia.
