= Monte Priora =

Mountain in Italy

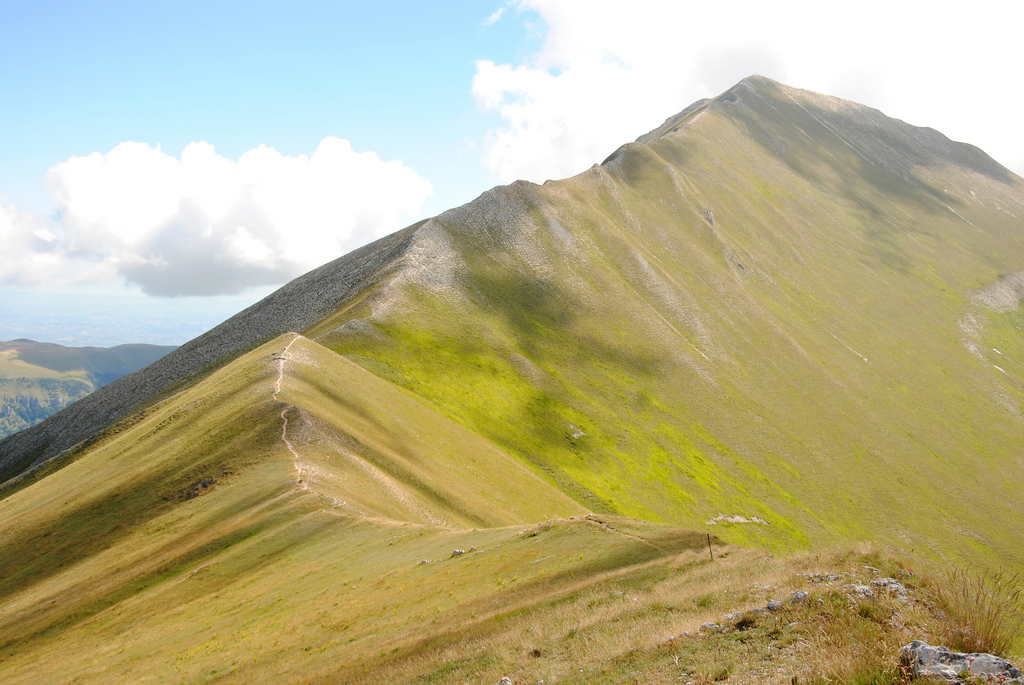

Highest point
- Elevation: 2,333 m (7,654 ft)
- Prominence: 447 m (1,467 ft)
- Coordinates: 42°56′01″N 13°14′28″E

Geography
- Location within Italy
- Location: Marche, Italy
- Parent range: Apennines

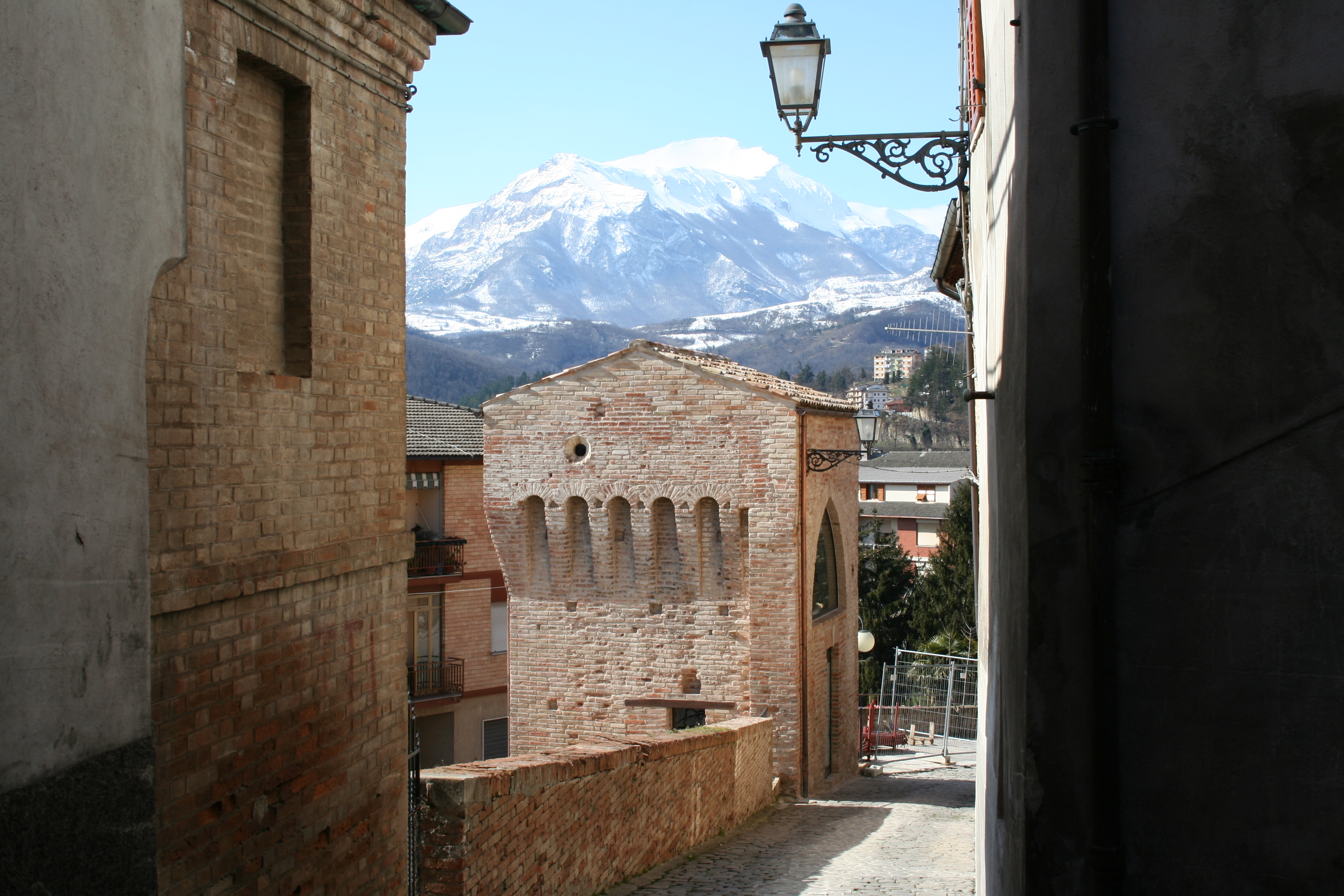
View of Monte Priora

Monte Priora is a mountain of Marche, Italy, representing the third highest peak in the group of Sibillini Mountains, after Mount Vettore and Cima del Redentore. Mount Priora's summit is also known as Pizzo della Regina (Italian for Peak of the Queen).
