= Ripe San Ginesio =

- Comune
- Comune di Ripe San Ginesio
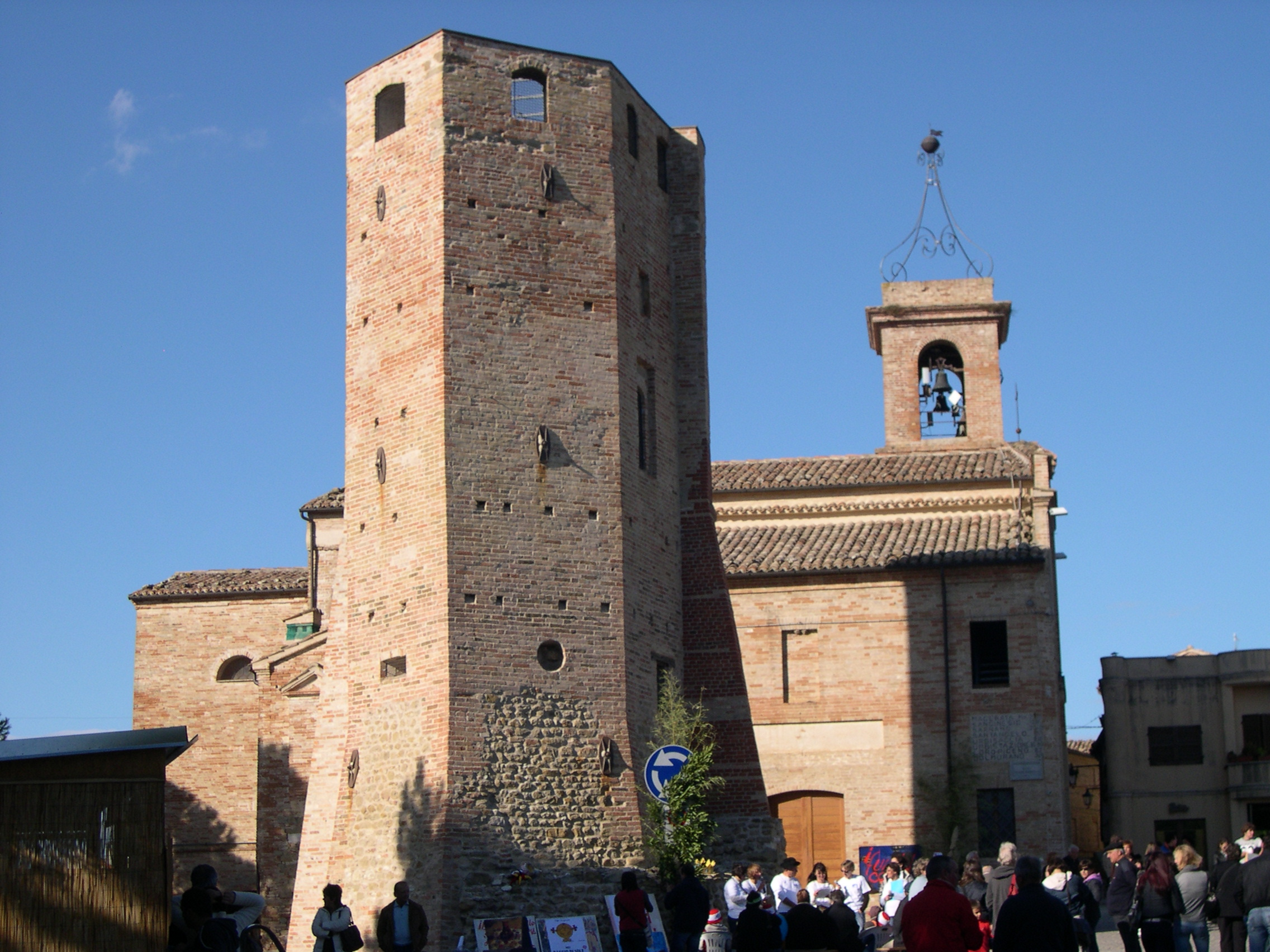

- Coat of arms

- Location within Italy Location within Marche
- Coordinates: 43°9′N 13°22′E
- Country: Italy
- Region: Marche
- Province: Macerata (MC)

Government
  - Mayor: Paolo Teodori

Area
  - Total: 10.1 km^{2} (3.9 sq mi)
- Elevation: 430 m (1,410 ft)

Population (30 June 2011)
  - Total: 871
  - Density: 86.2/km^{2} (223/sq mi)
- Demonym: Ripani
- Time zone: UTC+1 (CET)
  - Summer (DST): UTC+2 (CEST)
- Postal code: 62020
- Dialing code: 0733
- Patron saint: St. Michael Archangel
- Saint day: May 8
- Website: Official website

Ripe San Ginesio is a comune (municipality) in the Province of Macerata in the Italian region Marche, located about 50 kilometres (31 mi) south of Ancona and about 20 kilometres (12 mi) southwest of Macerata.

Ripe San Ginesio borders the following municipalities: Colmurano, Loro Piceno, San Ginesio, Sant'Angelo in Pontano.
