= Stefano Folchetti =

Italian painter

Stefano Folchetti (active in 15th-century through early 16th-century) was an Italian painter active in the Quattrocento period, mainly in the region of Marche.

He was born in San Ginesio. His triptych depicting St Lawrence on left, St Catherine of Alexandria with Virgin and child and angelic musicians at center, and papal saint on right (1507) was painted for the Collegiata di San Lorenzo at Urbisaglia. One of his works is a heavily gilded Adoration of the Magi at the Philadelphia Museum of Art. There are two works on display in the Pinacoteca Civica of San Ginesio in the Marche.

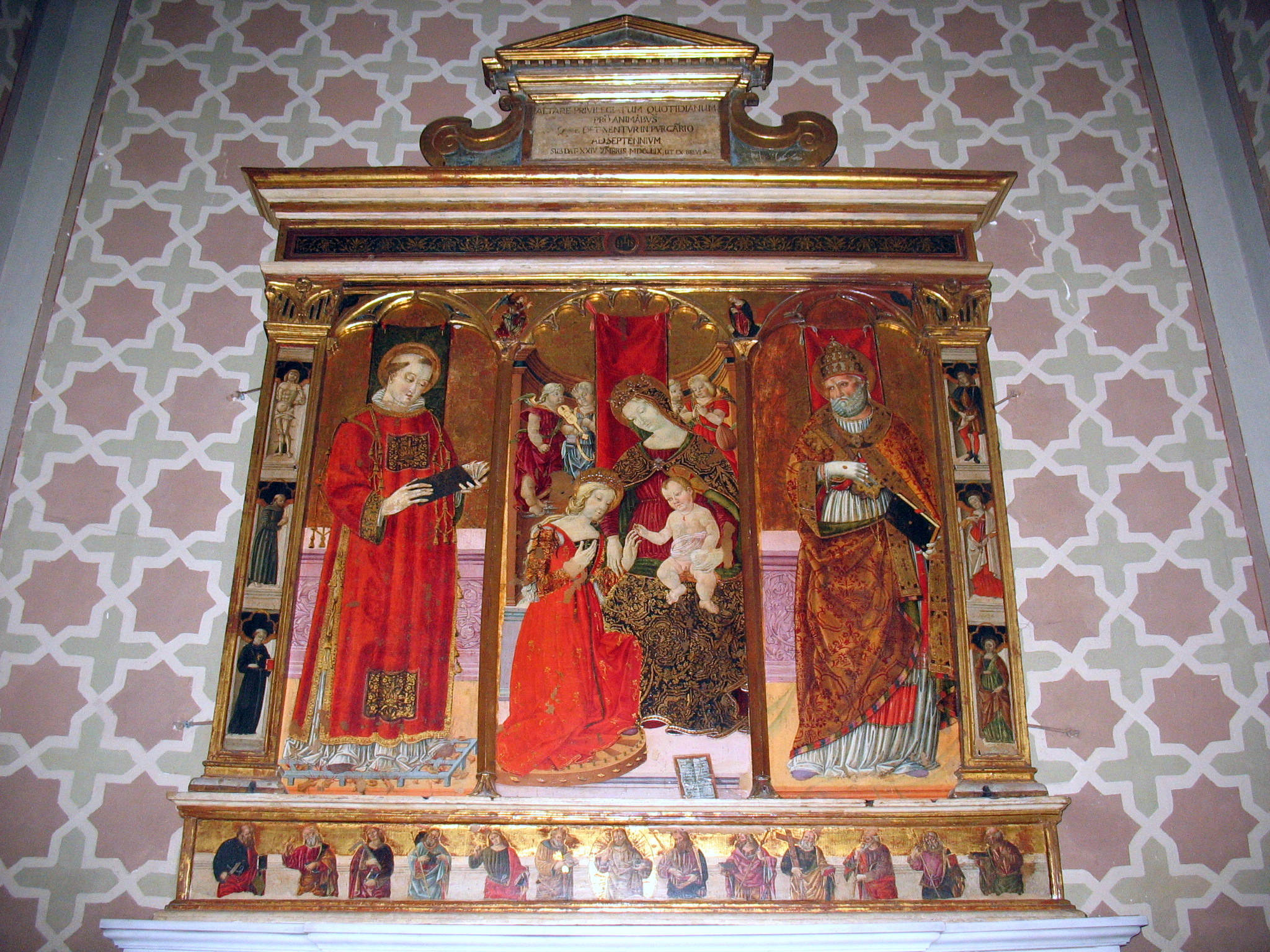
Triptych of San Lorenzo, Urbisaglia
