= Scipione Gentili =

Italian legal scholar (1563–1616)

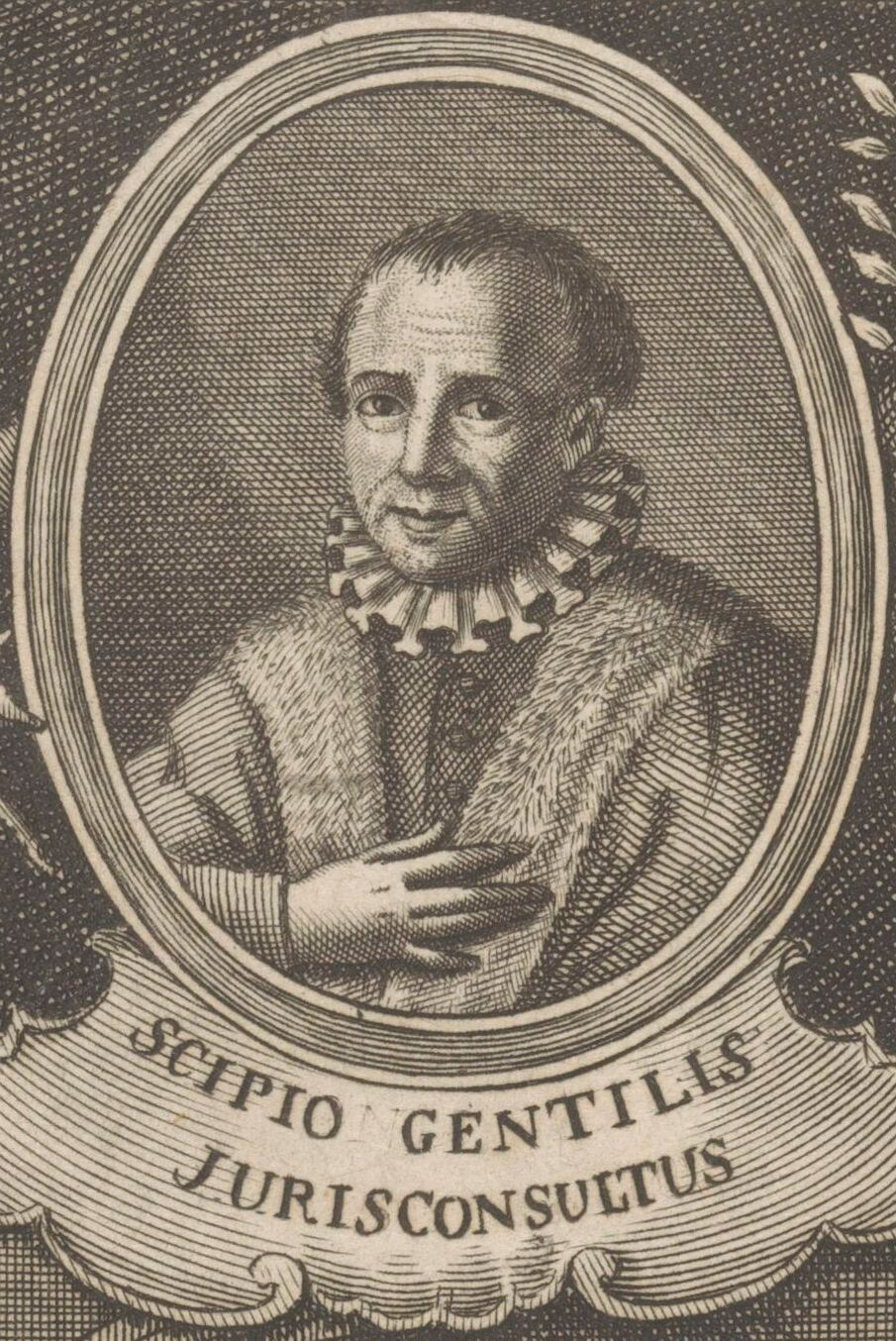
- Engraved portrait of Gentili
- Born: 1563; San Ginesio, Macerata, Italy
- Died: 7 August 1616 (aged 52–53); London, England
- Employer: University of Heidelberg
- Parent(s): Dr Matteo Gentili; Lucrezia Petrelli
- Relatives: Alberico Gentili (brother)

Academic background
- Education: University of Heidelberg

Scipione Gentili (Latin: Scipio Gentilis; 1563 – August 7, 1616) was an Italian law professor and a legal writer. One of his six brothers was Alberico Gentili, one of the fathers of international law.

== Biography ==
Born at San Ginesio, Scipione Gentili left Italy at the age of 16 when he had to emigrate together with his father and his brother Alberico because of their Protestant beliefs. Together with his brother and his father, he settled in England, and, in the early 1580s, published several books with the London printer John Wolfe, all dedicated to Sir Philip Sidney. Of them, the most important was a partial Latin translation of Torquato Tasso's Jerusalem Delivered. Scipione spent his life in Germany. He studied law at the universities of Tübingen, Wittenberg, Leiden, Heidelberg and Basel.

He reached the doctorate in 1589 and started to teach law at the university of Heidelberg. Quarrels with his Italian compatriot Giulio Pace made him leave Heidelberg and go to the German university in Altdorf bei Nürnberg. There, the famous jurist Hugues Doneau (Hugo Donellus, 1527–1591), who had been among his teachers at Leiden, procured him a professorship, which Scipione kept until his death.

While Alberico Gentili was, at least at the outset of his career, a staunch supporter of the traditional bartolist method of legal interpretation, Scipione was influenced by French jurists like Doneau and Jacques Cujas, who applied the methods of humanist philology to legal texts. Gentili's works, which fills eight quarto volumes in the 1763 edition, have not only legal writings but also wrote commentaries on St. Paul's Epistle to Philemon and on the Apologia of Lucius Apuleius as well as a translation into Latin of and Annotazioni (in Italian) on Torquato Tasso's epic Jerusalem Delivered. Among his legal works are two voluminous treatises De donationibus inter virum et uxorem (on donations between husband and wife, which were illegal and void under Roman law) and De jurisdictione (on jurisdiction). Gentili also edited the final part of Doneau's Commentarii de Iure Civili, thereby securing the completion of the influential work, which the author had not been able to finish before his death. Gentili rendered a similar service to his brother Alberico, whose Hispanica Advocatio he edited in 1613.

During his lifetime, Scipione Gentili was held in high esteem all over Europe. His fame probably even surpassed that of his brother. Pope Clement VIII is said to have offered him the possibility to return to Italy and to teach at Bologna without having to give up his Protestant beliefs, an offer that Gentili did not accept. However, after his death, Scipione Gentili was quickly forgotten. Unlike his brother Alberico, who was rediscovered in the 19th century, Scipione Gentili is still waiting for a re-evaluation of his work.
