= Santa Maria in Vepretis, San Ginesio =

Catholic church in Macerata province, Italy

Coordinates: 43°06′23.1″N 13°19′17.9″E

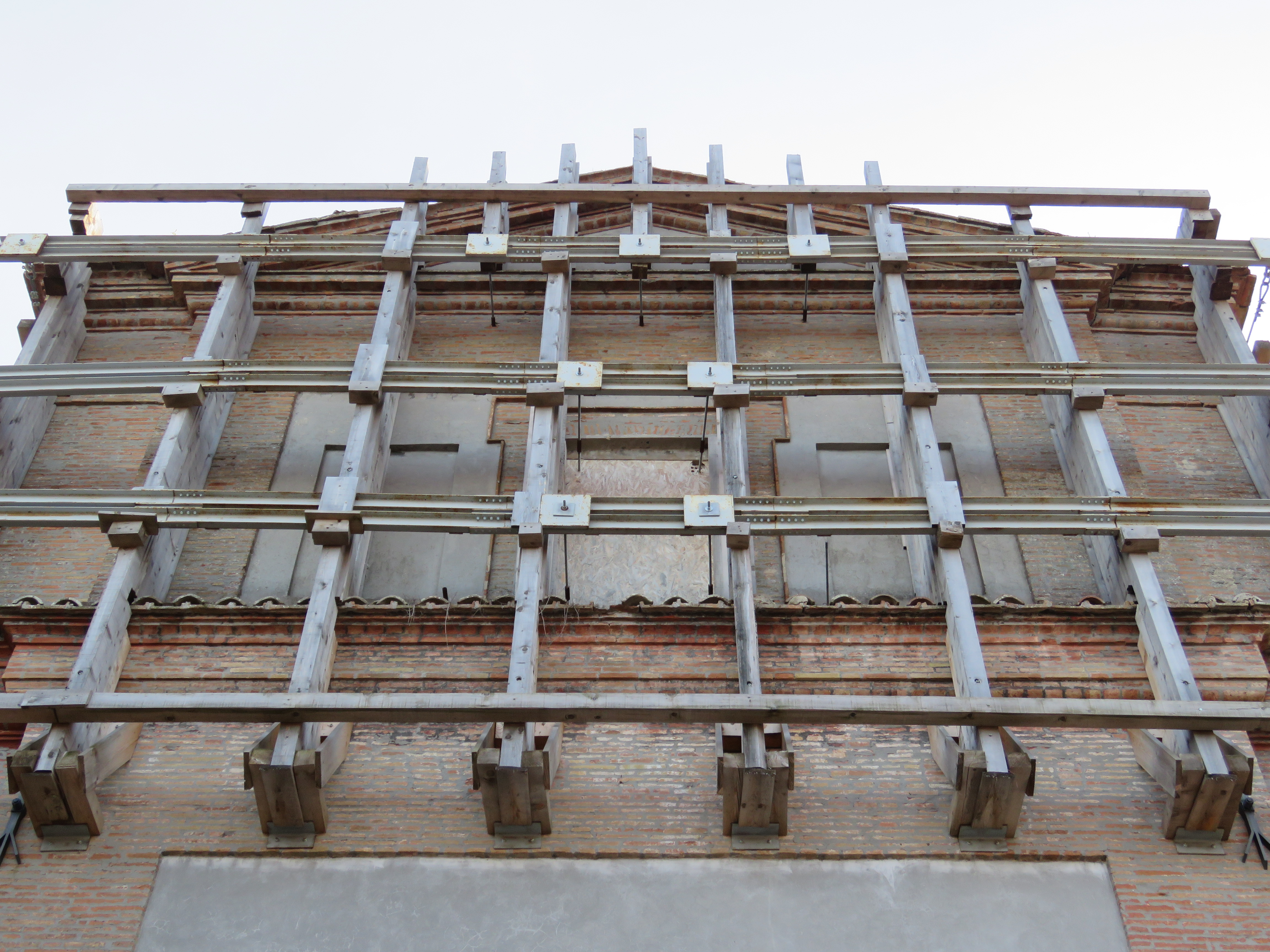
Facade of the Church of Santa Maria in Vepretis

Santa Maria in Vepretis is a Baroque-style, Roman Catholic church located in the town of San Ginesio, province of Macerata, region of Marche, Italy.

== History ==
A church had been here since medieval era, and it was rebuilt in the 18th century. The exterior is plain and brick, but the interior is highly decorated in baroque fashion. A single nave opens to six side chapels. In front of the presbytery are wooden choir seats. The main altar is framed by columns with gilded Corinthian capitals and suffused with stucco sculptures and decorations. It frames a small icon of the Virgin and a larger altarpiece depicting a somewhat archaic Assumption of an Enthroned Virgin attributed to Carlo Maratta. The stucco sculptures were created by Cipriano Morelli.
