= Abbey of Santa Maria delle Macchie, San Ginesio =

Monastery in San Ginesio, Italy

The Abbazia di Santa Maria delle Macchie (Santa Maria Macularum) was a Roman Catholic Benedictine monastery in a rural hamlet of Macchie, a few kilometers from the town of San Ginesio, in the province of Macerata, region of Marche, Italy.

== History ==
In 1658, Cardinal Giovanni Battista Pallotta promoted restoration of the entire complex: church and monastery. The well-preserved Romanesque-style crypt retains some of the few original elements. The 17th-century Baroque brick facade has a curved pediment roofline, and the facade has eliminated a prior rose window, replaced with four awkward rectangular windows. The original round arch terracotta portal had some spolia fragments of marble friezes and volutes. The church layout now has a single nave. The presbytery is elevated to accommodate the crypt, and the apse has two large chapels.

The crypt is the jewel of the site, with seven naves densely populated by columns and pilasters. The columns have some romanesque capitals with decorative plant and animal motifs, others are ancient Roman ionic capitals and marble shaft columns.

== See also ==
- Catholic Church in Italy
