= Monte Vettore =

Mountain in Italy

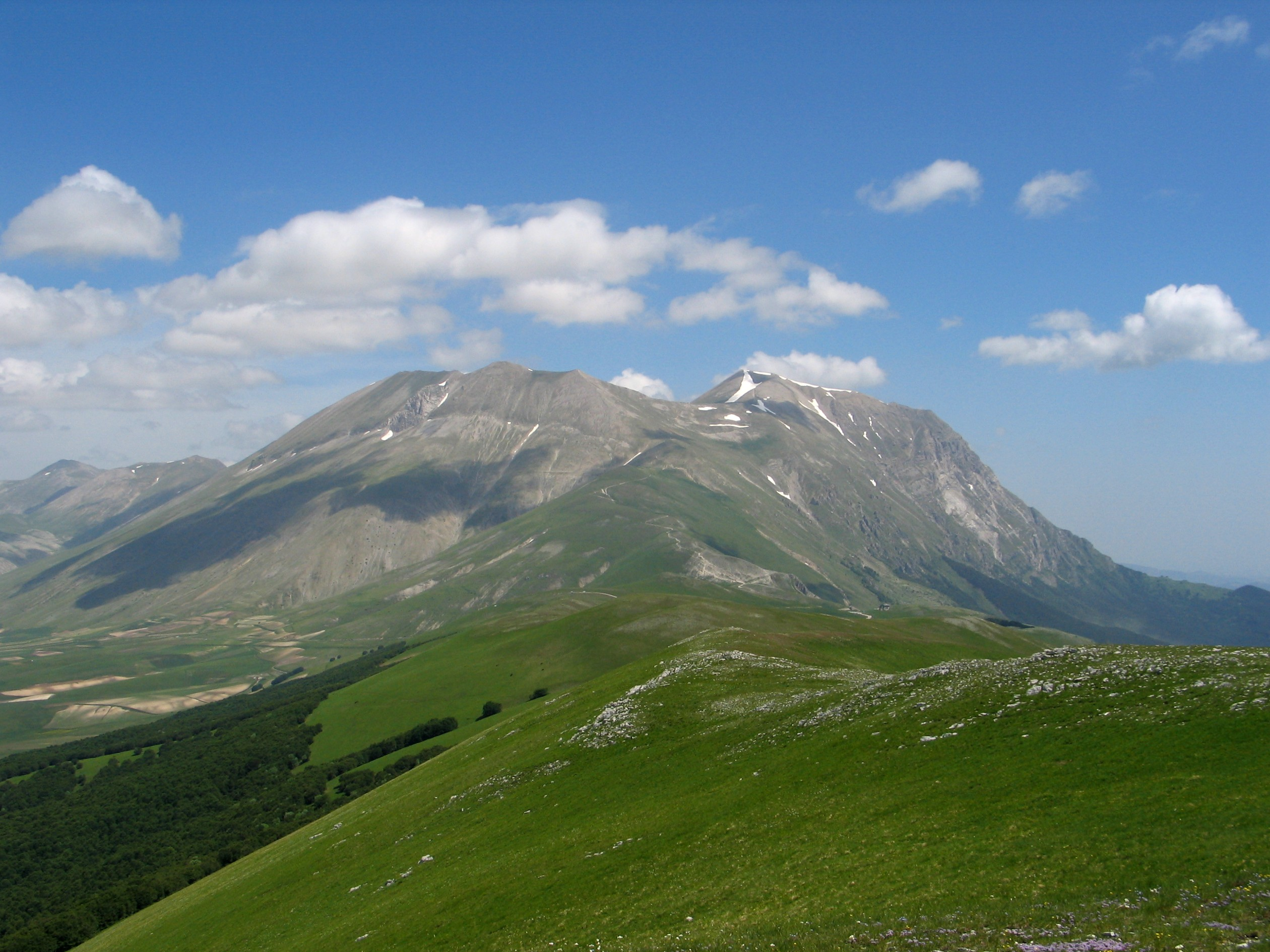
- Southwest ridge

Highest point
- Elevation: 2,476 m (8,123 ft)
- Prominence: 1,463 m (4,800 ft)
- Isolation: 41.56 km (25.82 mi)
- Listing: Ribu
- Coordinates: 42°49′N 13°16′E

Geography
- Location within Italy
- Location: Italy
- Parent range: Apennines

Climbing
- Easiest route: Hike

Monte Vettore (from Latin Vector, "carrier", "leader") is a mountain of the Umbro-marchigiano Apennine Mountains in Italy. It is the highest peak of the Sibillini massif. It is located in the Ascoli Piceno province, Marche, Italy.

== Geology ==
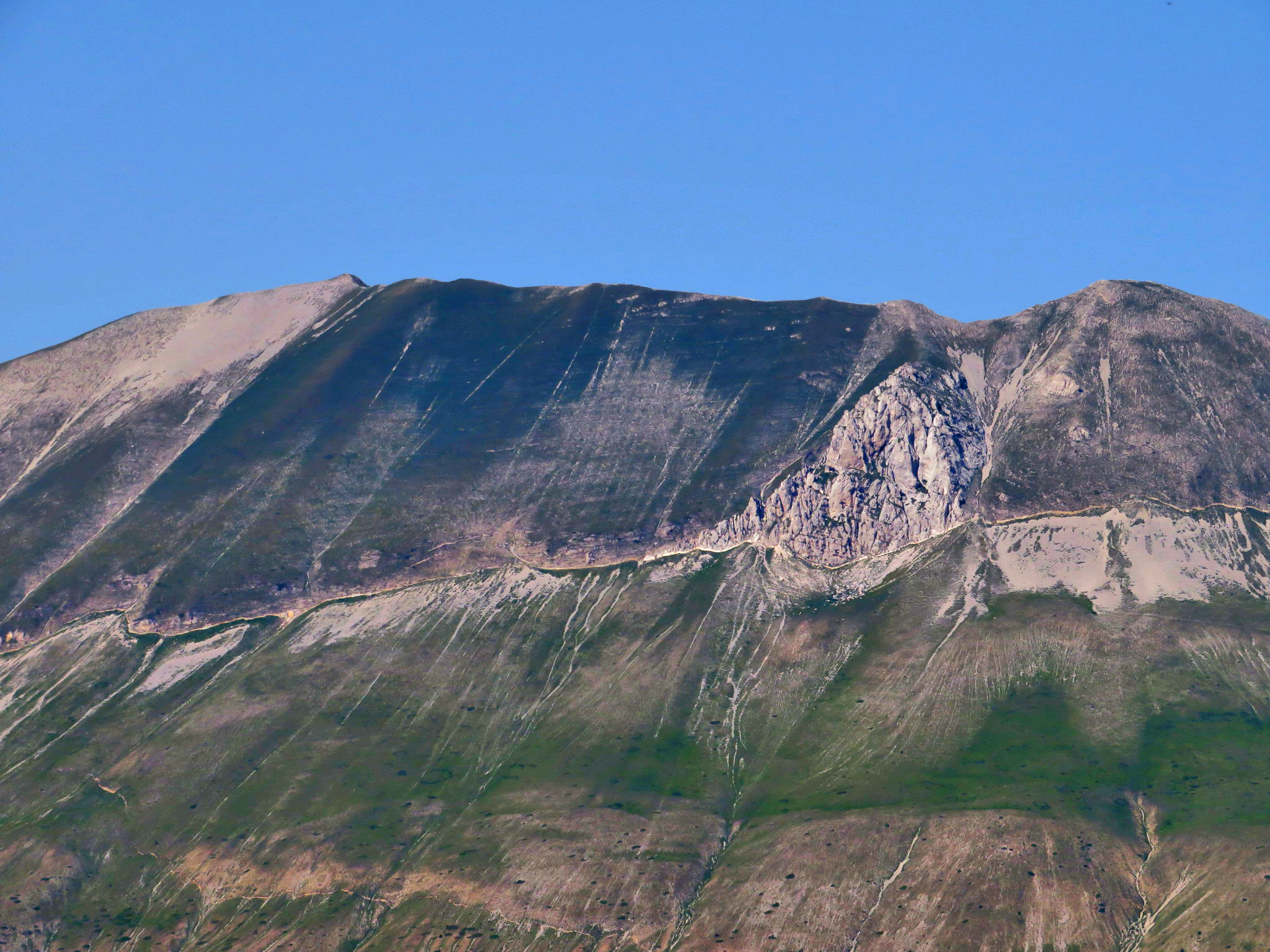
The Cordone del Vettore fault scarp

Monte Vettore is a calcareous mountain, which rocks belong to the umbro-marchigiana succession and that formed mostly during the Jurassic period, with a fossil record consisting mostly of ammonites and gastropods. Structurally, Vettore represents the highest portion of the Sibillini mountains overthrust, which was active during the Miocene. During the Quaternary period, after the uplift of the Apennine Mountains, ice age glaciers eroded the northern slopes of the mountain, while on the western side normal faults created intermontane plateaus, like the Piani di Castelluccio. Extensional tectonic activity is showed by structures like the Cordone del Vettore, a fault scarp that reactivated after the 2016–17 Central Italy earthquakes.

== Geography ==
The southwestern side of Sibillini massif, including the Vettore peak, is in Sibillini Mountains National Park. Below the summit of Vettore lies a small glacial lake in a small enclosed valley between Redeemer Peak.

== History ==
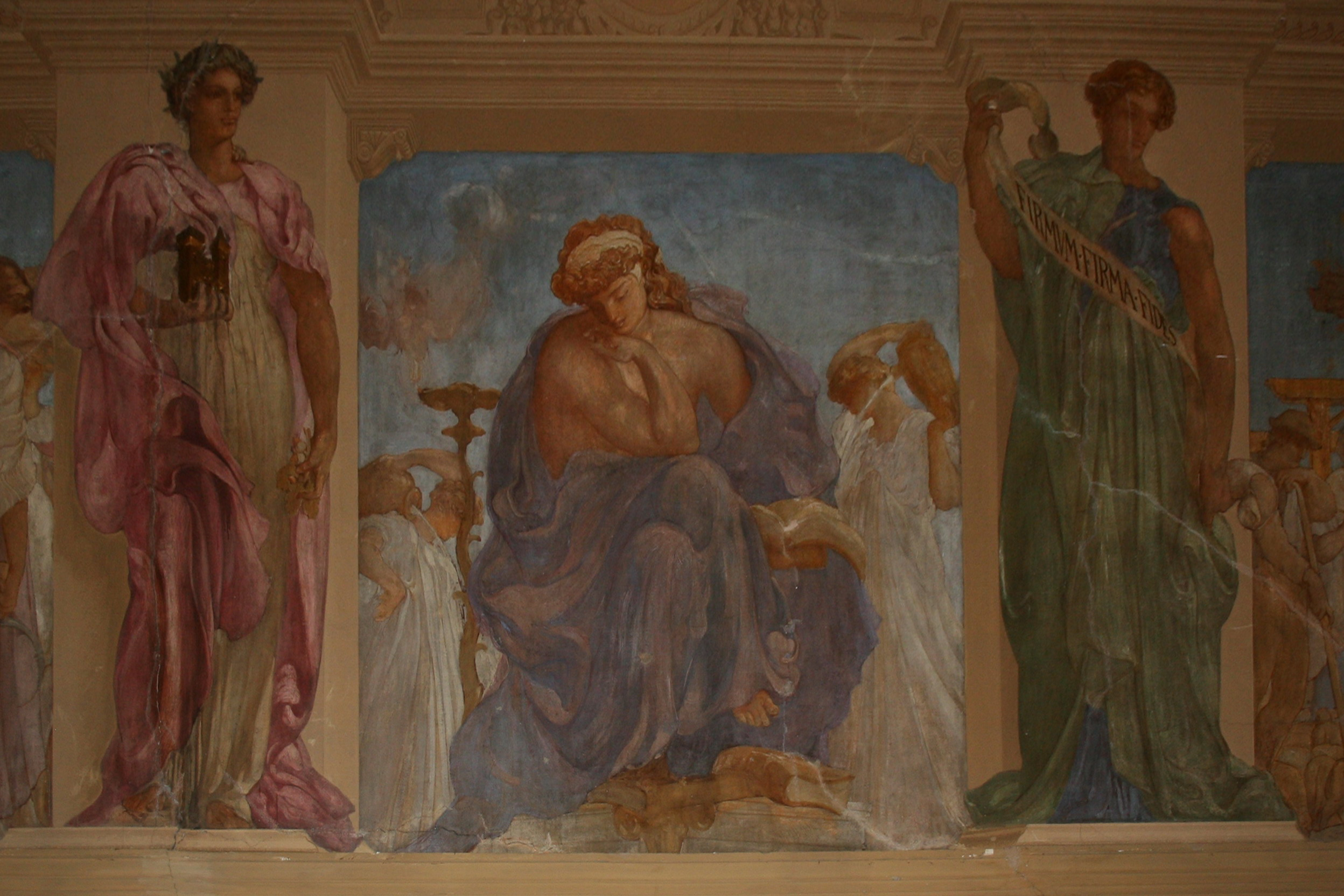
Apennine Sibyl by Adolfo de Carolis

The local medieval tradition was that the Apennine Sibyl, a mysterious prophetess not counted among the Sibyls of Classical Antiquity, was condemned by God to dwell in a mountain cavern and await Judgement Day, having rebelled at the news that she had not been chosen Mother of God, but that some humble Judaean virgin had been favored. The peak of Monte Vettore, surrounded by reddish cliffs was recognized as the crown of Regina Sibilla.

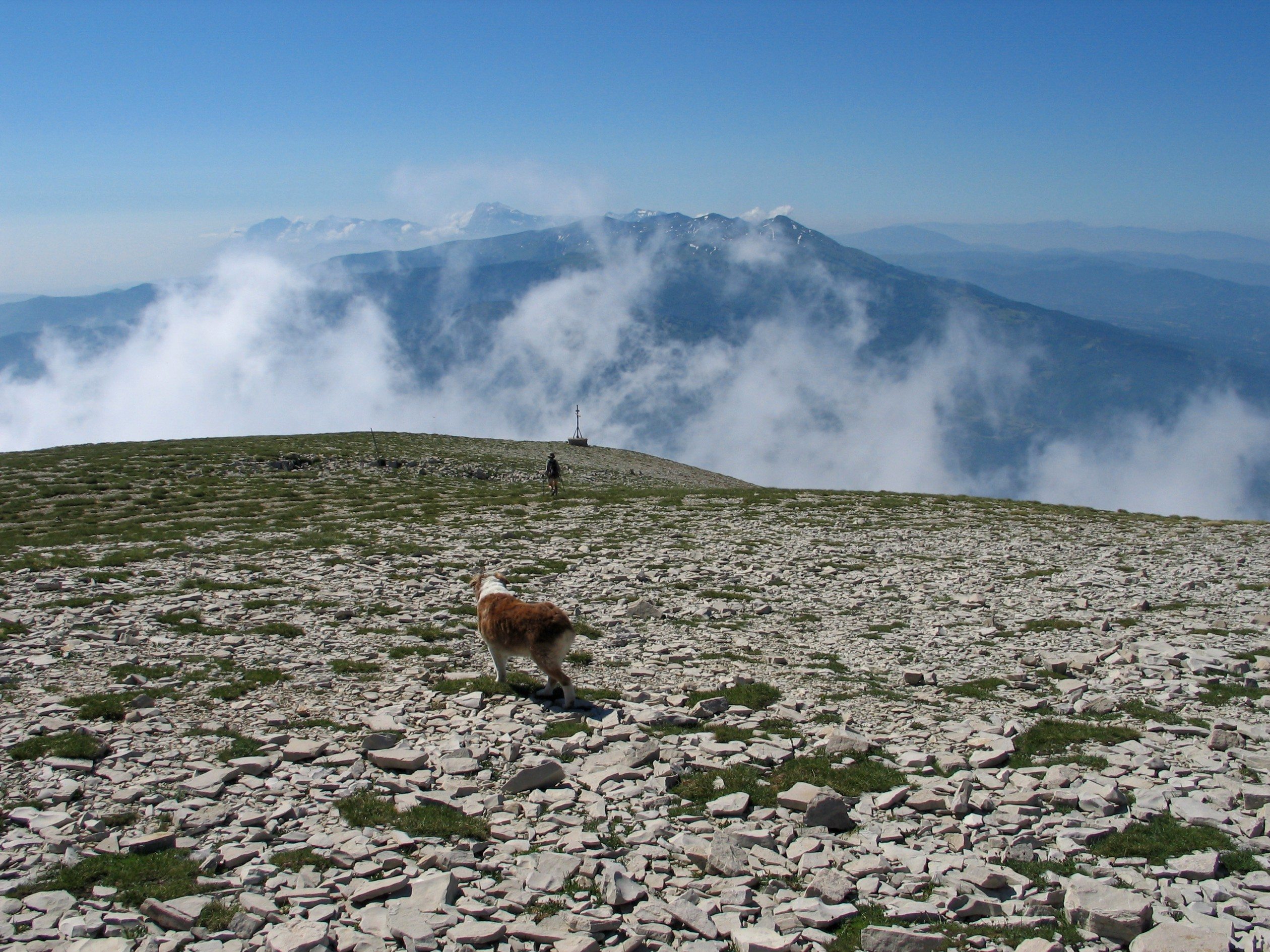
Monte Vettore summit view with Maile

Less stringently Christian legend set her in an underworld paradise entered through a grotto in the mountains of Norcia. Nearby the magical lake is fed by water from the cavern. Whoever stayed longer than a year could no longer leave, but remained deathless and ageless, feasting in abundance, amid revelry and voluptuous delights.

== In popular culture ==
In Il Guerrin Meschino, written by Andrea da Barberino about 1410, the central episode of the sixth part (Canto V) contains the "prodigious adventures" of Guerrino with this enchantress, the "Fata" Alcina, whom he seeks out, against all advice. He locates her cavern in the mountains of central Italy with the aid of Macco, a speaking serpent. She shows him the delights and horrors of her cavern, where sinners have been changed to the appropriate animals, but where sin is the only path to the knowledge of his real parents that he seeks, and Guerrin has to flee.

The long informative captions in the maps of Ortelius' 16th-century atlas, Cartographia Neerlandica, offer some detail about this Apennine Sybil:

The Mountain Apennine here looms over the country with exceedingly high cragged tops, in which one finds that huge cave called Sibylla's cave, (in their language Grotta della Sibylla) and which the poets would have the Elysian Fields. For the common people dream about a certain Sibylla [supposed] to be in this cave, who [is claimed to] possess a large kingdom full of gorgeous buildings and Princely palaces, covered with pleasant gardens, abounding with many fine lecherous wenches and all kinds of pleasures and delights. All of these she will bestow on those who through this cave (which is always open) will come to her. And after they have been there for the period of one whole year, they have the freedom and liberty given to them by Sibylla to depart (if they please) and from that moment, having returned to us, they state that they live a most blessed and happy life ever after. This cave is also known to our countrymen by the name of VROU VENUS BERGH, that is, The Lady Venus mount.

Locally the Sibilla was in some sense a beneficent fata whose retinue would descend from her mountain at times to teach the village girls all the secrets of spinning and weaving (see Weaving (mythology) for other European weaving goddesses), and perhaps to dance the saltarello with the best of the young men. But if they were not back in their mountain fastness by sunrise, they would be denied access and would become mere mortals. On one occasion, what with dancing and pleasure, the faterelle had not noticed the approach of dawn. Scrambling up the Vettore, their goatlike feet crushed the rock to fragments. They reached the safety of their grotto just before dawn, but the long slope of talus is still pointed out as the Path of the Fata.

== See also ==
- Monti Sibillini
- Venusberg (mythology)
- List of Italian regions by highest point
