= 2016–17 Central Italy earthquakes =

2016–2017 Central Italy earthquakes may refer to:

- August 2016 Central Italy earthquake
- October 2016 Central Italy earthquakes
- January 2017 Central Italy earthquakes
