= Cima del Redentore =

Mountain in Italy

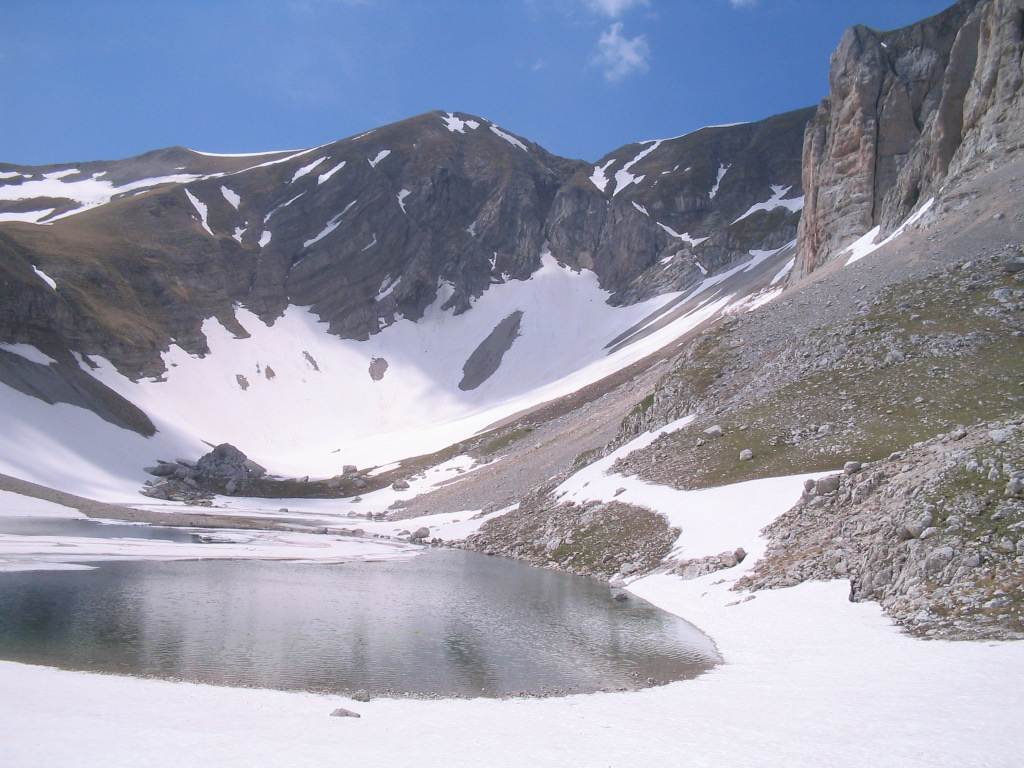

Highest point
- Elevation: 2,448 m (8,031 ft)
- Prominence: 208 m (682 ft)
- Isolation: 1.64 km (1.02 mi)
- Coordinates: 42°51′N 13°14′E

Geography
- Location within Italy
- Location: Marche/Umbria, Italy
- Parent range: Monti Sibillini

Cima del Redentore ("The Redeemer's Peak") is a mountain of the Sibillini Mountains of Apennines, Central Italy.

Located on the regional border between Umbria and Marche, its peak reaches an elevation of 2448 mt above sea level, and links Vettore and Sibilla. Pilate Lake is located beneath the base.

It is accessible from trails in the Monti Sibillini National Park.

== See also ==
- List of Italian regions by highest point
