= Macchie, Castelsantangelo sul Nera =

Macchie
- Frazione
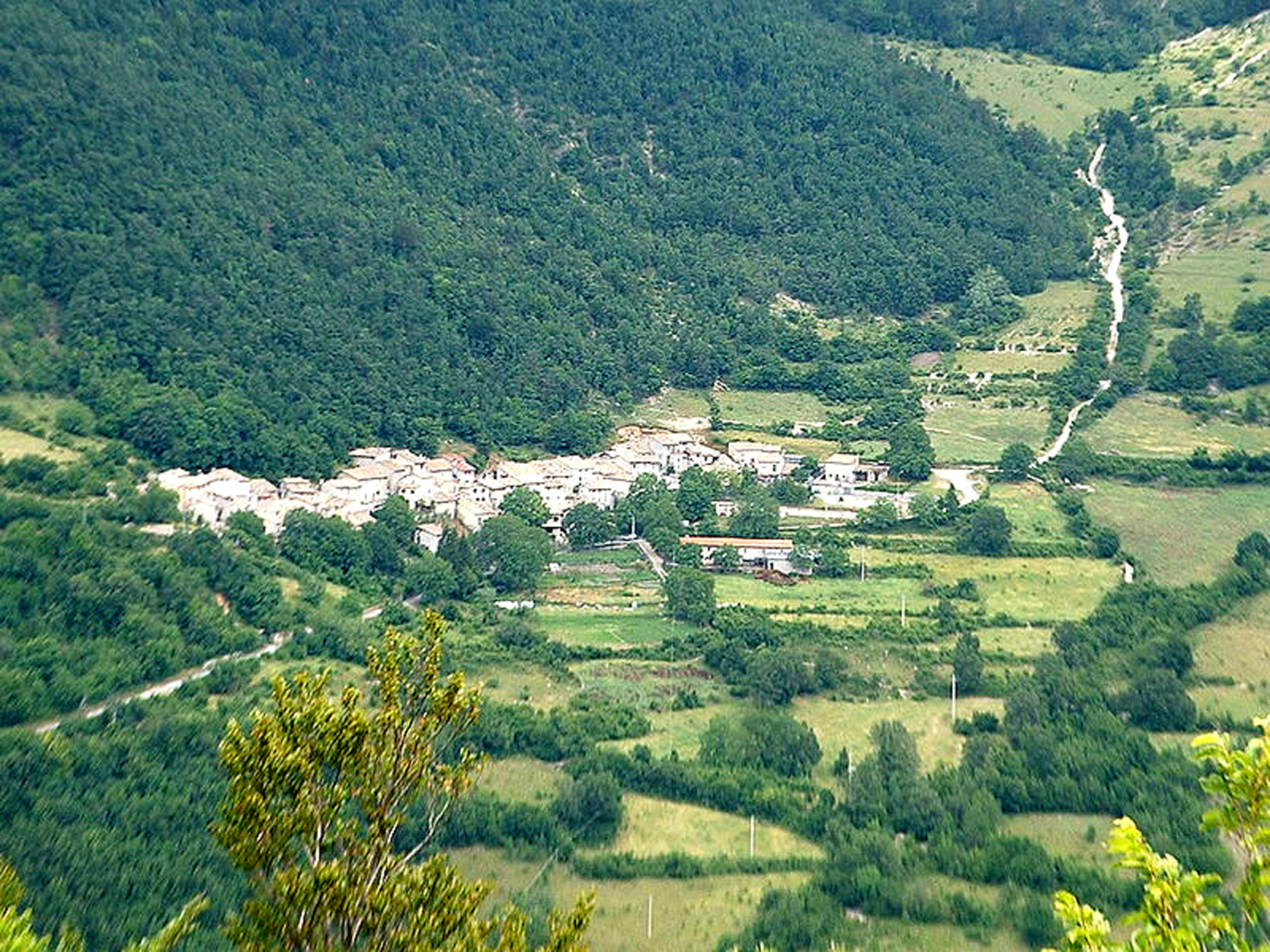
- Macchie from Spina di Gualdo

- Location of Macchie in Italy
- Coordinates: 42°53′50″N 13°10′58″E
- Country: Italy
- Region: Marche
- Province: Macerata (MC)
- Comune: Castelsantangelo sul Nera
- Elevation: 1,078 m (3,537 ft)

Population (2001)
  - Total: 16
- Demonym: Macchiani
- Time zone: UTC+1 (CET)
  - Summer (DST): UTC+2 (CEST)
- Postal code: 62039
- Dialing code: (+39) 0737
- Patron saint: St. John the Baptist
- Saint day: 24 June

Macchie is an Italian village and hamlet (frazione) of the municipality of Castelsantangelo sul Nera, in the Province of Macerata, Marche. For ISTAT 2001 census, it had a population of 16.

== Geography ==
The village is placed at 1078 metres in the middle of the Monti Sibillini National Park.

The name "Macchie" derives from the woods (in Italian: macchie) that surround the village. It is a mountainous area in the national park of the Sibillini mountains. Below the village one can admire the Vallinfante valley and nearby the Passo Cattivo, Porche di Vallinfante, Colle La Croce, Monte Pagliano, Monte Prata and Monte Cardosa. The village is also at the foot of Monte Cornaccione which, however, cannot be seen entirely from the village.

== Places of interest ==
There are two churches in Macchie: St. Anthony's (in Italian: Chiesa di Sant'Antonio) and St. John's(in Italian: Chiesa di San Giovanni Battista). At about 100 metres below the village there is a chapel: The Little Virgin (in Italian: La Madonnella), dedicated to the latter. It was restored and consecrated again in August 2007.

Likewise another chapel, along a nearby mountain: The Virgin of Forcella's Chapel (in Italian: Cappella della Madonna della Forcella), was completely rebuilt in the summer of 2008 by a group of volunteers.

== Photo gallery ==
Passo Cattivo dominates Macchie

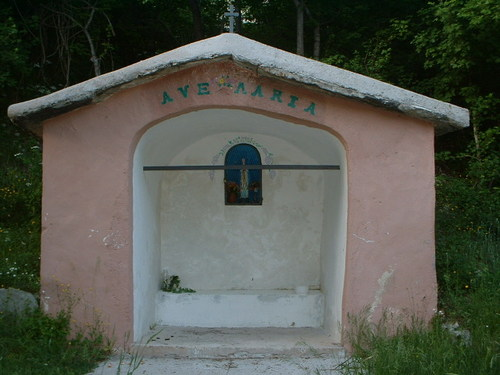
The Little Virgin is placed on the old way to Vallinfante

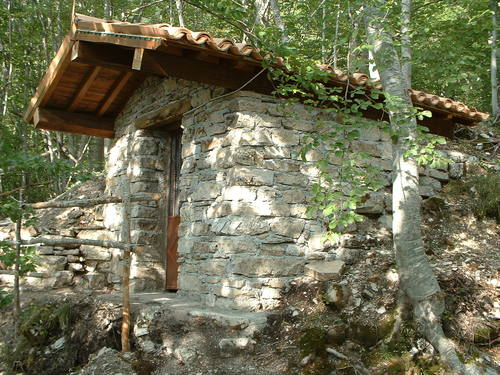
The Virgin of Forcella's Chapel is placed along a nearby mountain

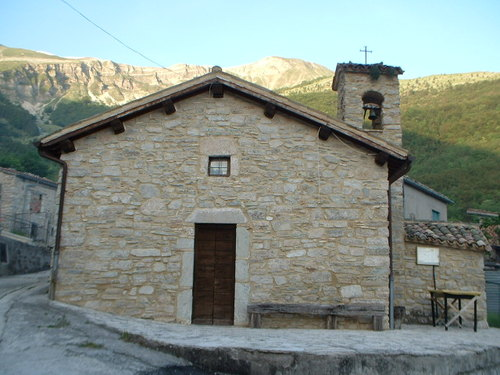
The St. John's Church is in the plaza

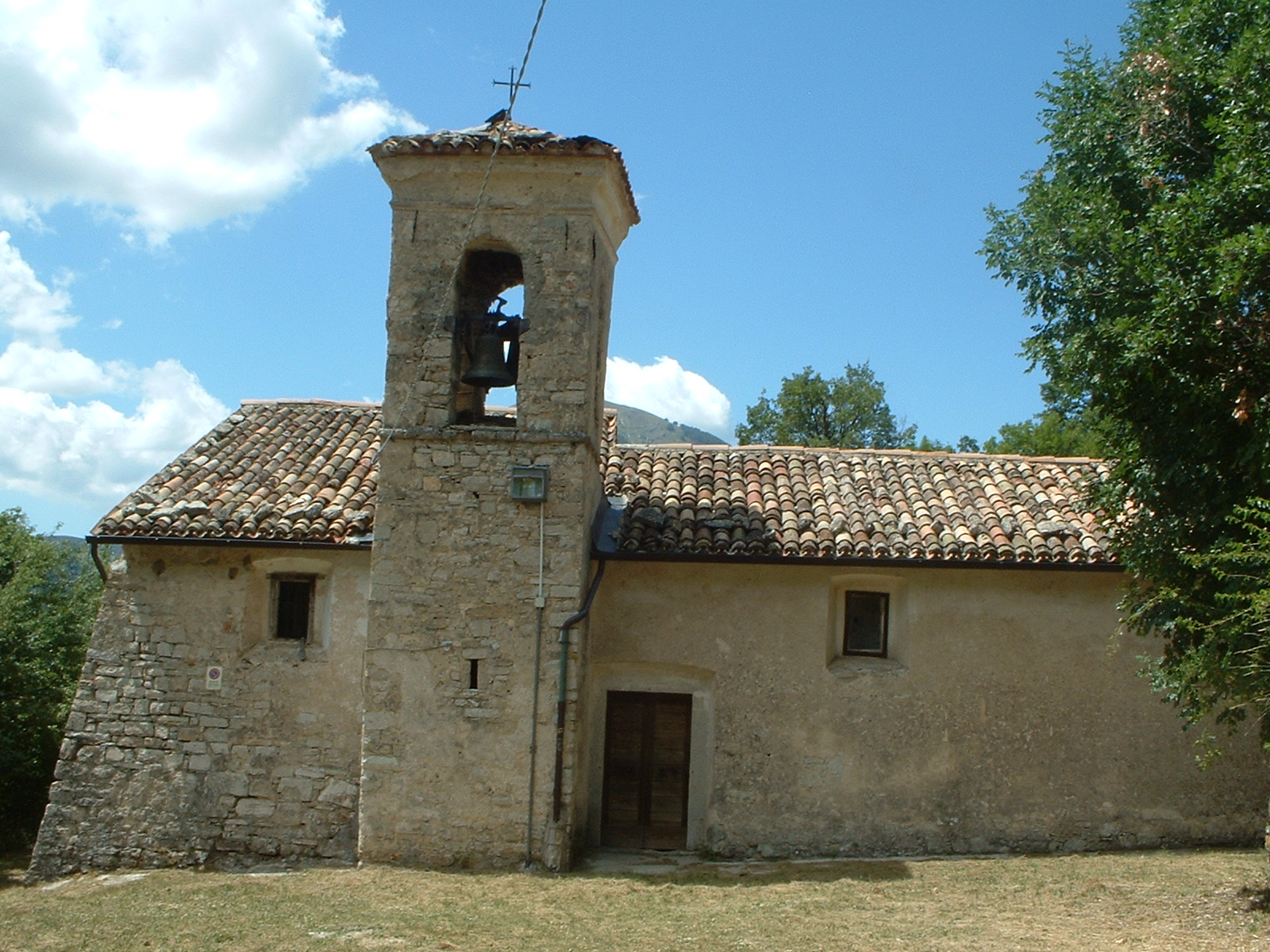
The St. Anthony's Church is placed at the end of Macchie

== Bibliography ==
- Sonia Pierangeli. Castelsantangelo sul Nera La Storia I Simboli Le Emozioni. Piediripa, Grafica Maceratese, 2009.
