= Punta di Valloprare =

Mountain in Italy

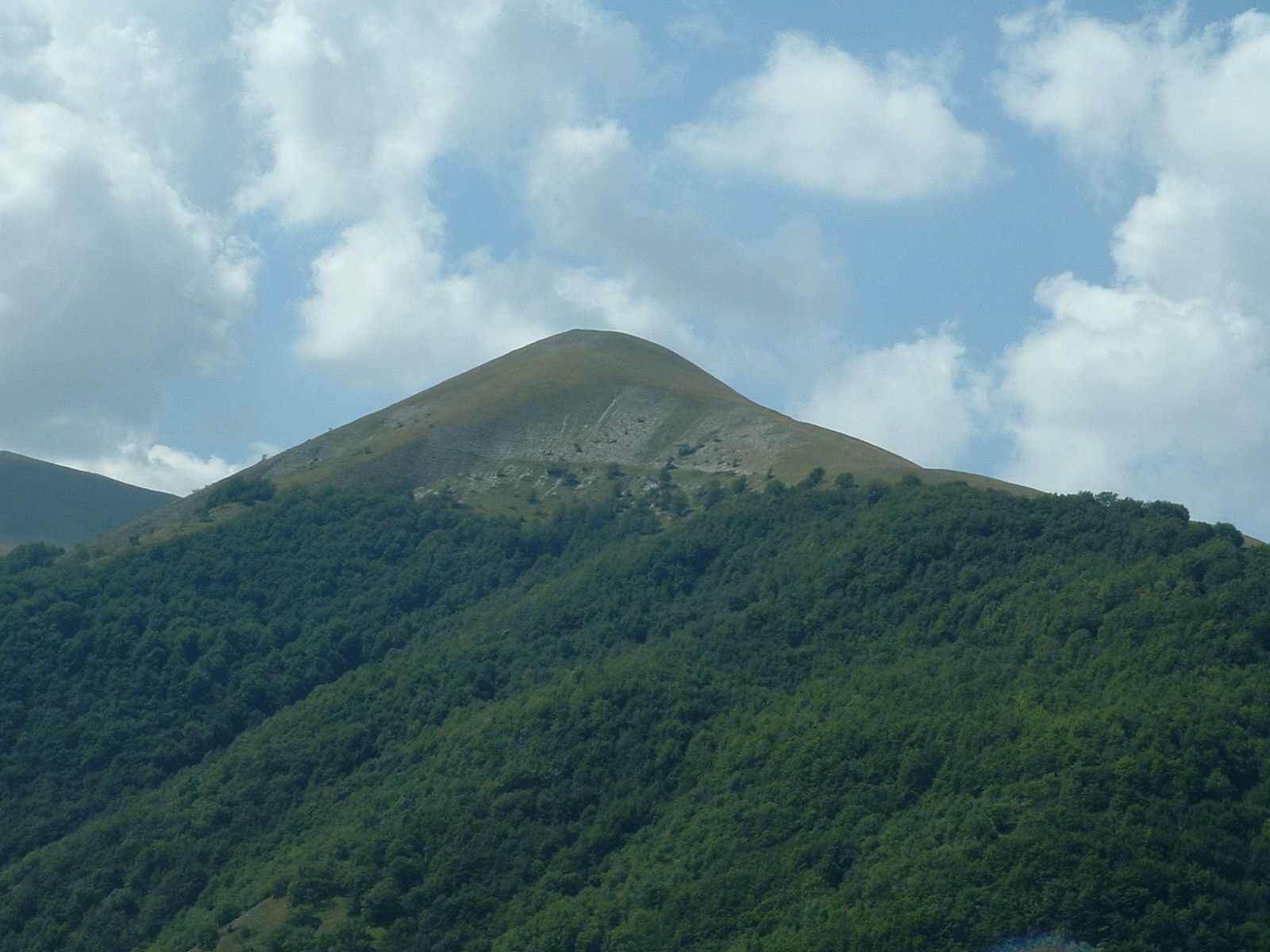
- A view of Punta di Valloprare from Spina di Gualdo

Highest point
- Elevation: 1,776 m (5,827 ft)
- Coordinates: 42°51′25″N 13°10′23″E

Geography
- Location within Italy
- Location: Province of Macerata, Italy
- Parent range: Monti Sibillini

Punta di Valloprare is a mountain in the Province of Macerata, Marche, Italy in the Monti Sibillini National Park, at 1776m above mean sea level.

== Name ==
The mountain is called Punta di Valloprare because the valley near it is Valloprare.

== Near villages ==
Near the mountain there are Gualdo, Spina di Gualdo and Rapegna, frazioni of Castelsantangelo sul Nera.

== Connections ==
Punta di Valloprare is connected to Gualdo, Monte Pian Falcone and Monte Lieto.
