= Monte Cornaccione =

Mountain in Italy

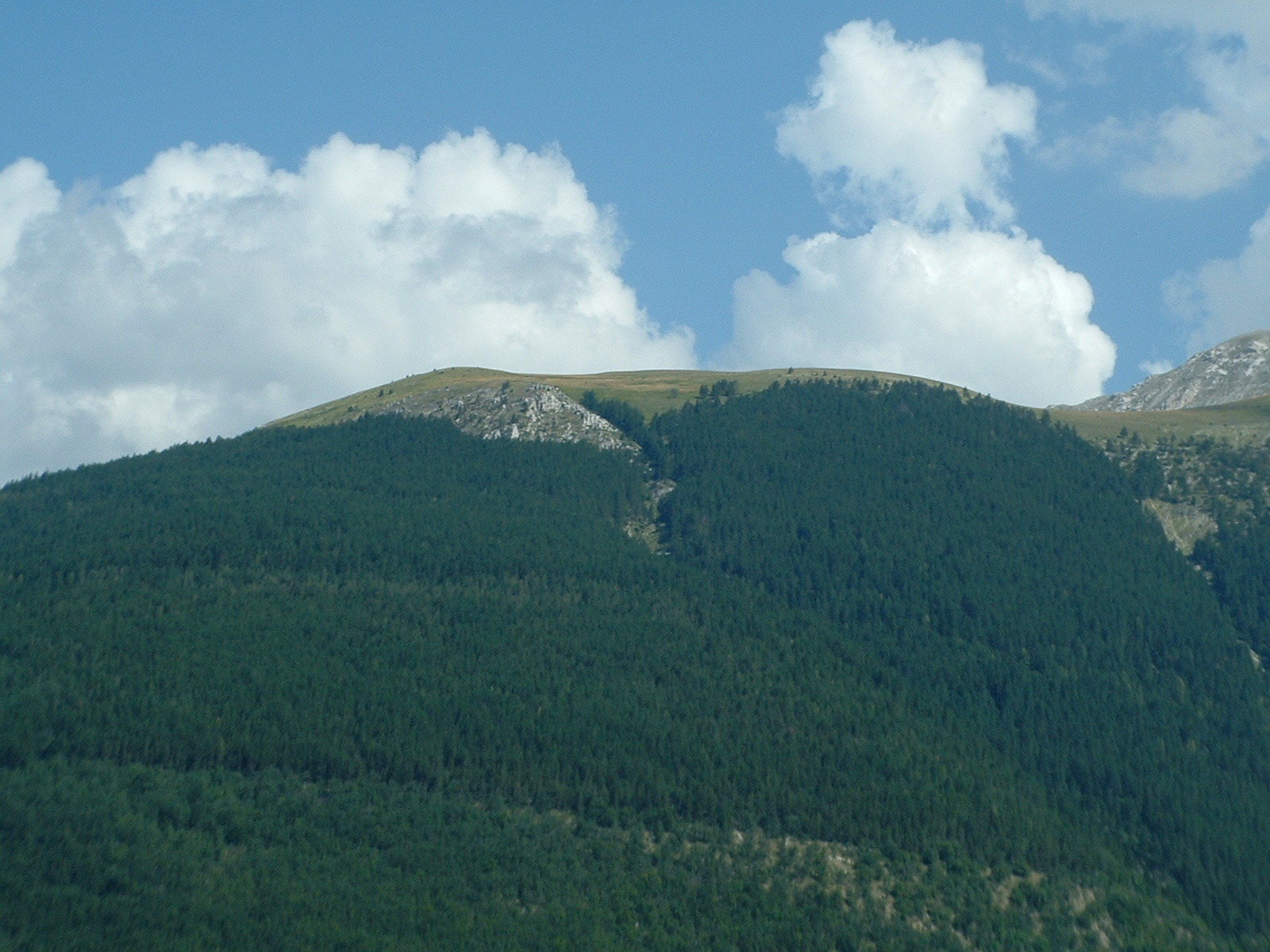
- A view of Monte Cornaccione from Spina di Gualdo

Highest point
- Elevation: 1,769 m (5,804 ft)
- Coordinates: 42°54′34″N 13°10′59″E

Geography
- Location within Italy
- Location: Province of Macerata, Italy
- Parent range: Monti Sibillini

Monte Cornaccione, or simply Cornaccione, is a mountain in the Marche, Province of Macerata, in the Monti Sibillini National Park. Its peak rises 1769 meters above mean sea level.

== Name ==
The place is named Cornaccione because it can seem to a horn (in Italian: corno).

== Near Villages ==
At the foot of Monte Cornaccione there is Macchie.

== Connections ==
Cornaccione is connected to Monte Bicco and Monte Bove Sud.
