= Colle La Croce =

Mountain in Italy

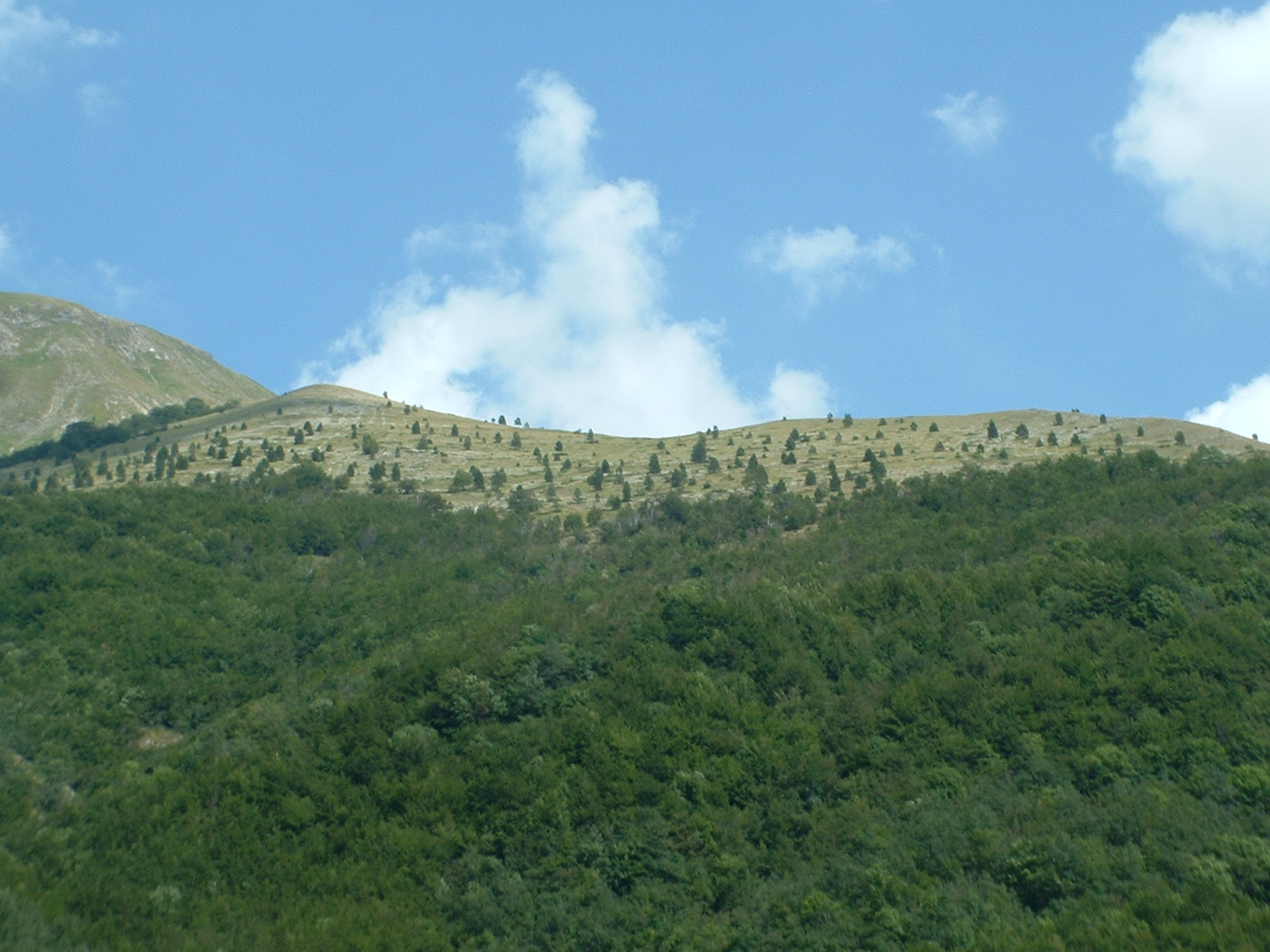
- A view of Colle La Croce from Macchie

Highest point
- Elevation: 1,623 metres (5,325 ft)
- Coordinates: 42°53′50″N 13°12′0″E

Geography
- Location: Province of Macerata, Italy
- Parent range: Monti Sibillini

Colle La Croce, or simply La Croce, is a mountain in the Marche, Province of Macerata, in the Monti Sibillini National Park, at 1623 above mean sea level. As of the 21st century, La Croce is covered in meadows and secondary growth up to its peak.

== Name ==
Colle La Croce is so named simply because there is a cross (in Italian: croce) at the top.

== Near villages ==
Macchie is at the foot of Colle La Croce, but from its peak you can view Vallinfante.

== Connections ==
Colle La Croce is connected to Macchie, Passo Cattivo and Porche di Vallinfante.
