= Sanctuary of Macereto =

Sanctuary in Macereto, Italy

Coordinates: 42.9762°N 13.1157°E

The Sanctuary of Macereto is a Renaissance-style chapel or Marian shrine in Visso, province of Macerata, Marche, Italy. Built between 1528 and 1538 around a rustic 14th-century chapel housing a venerated statue of the Madonna, it is located in the Parco Nazionale dei Monti Sibillini.

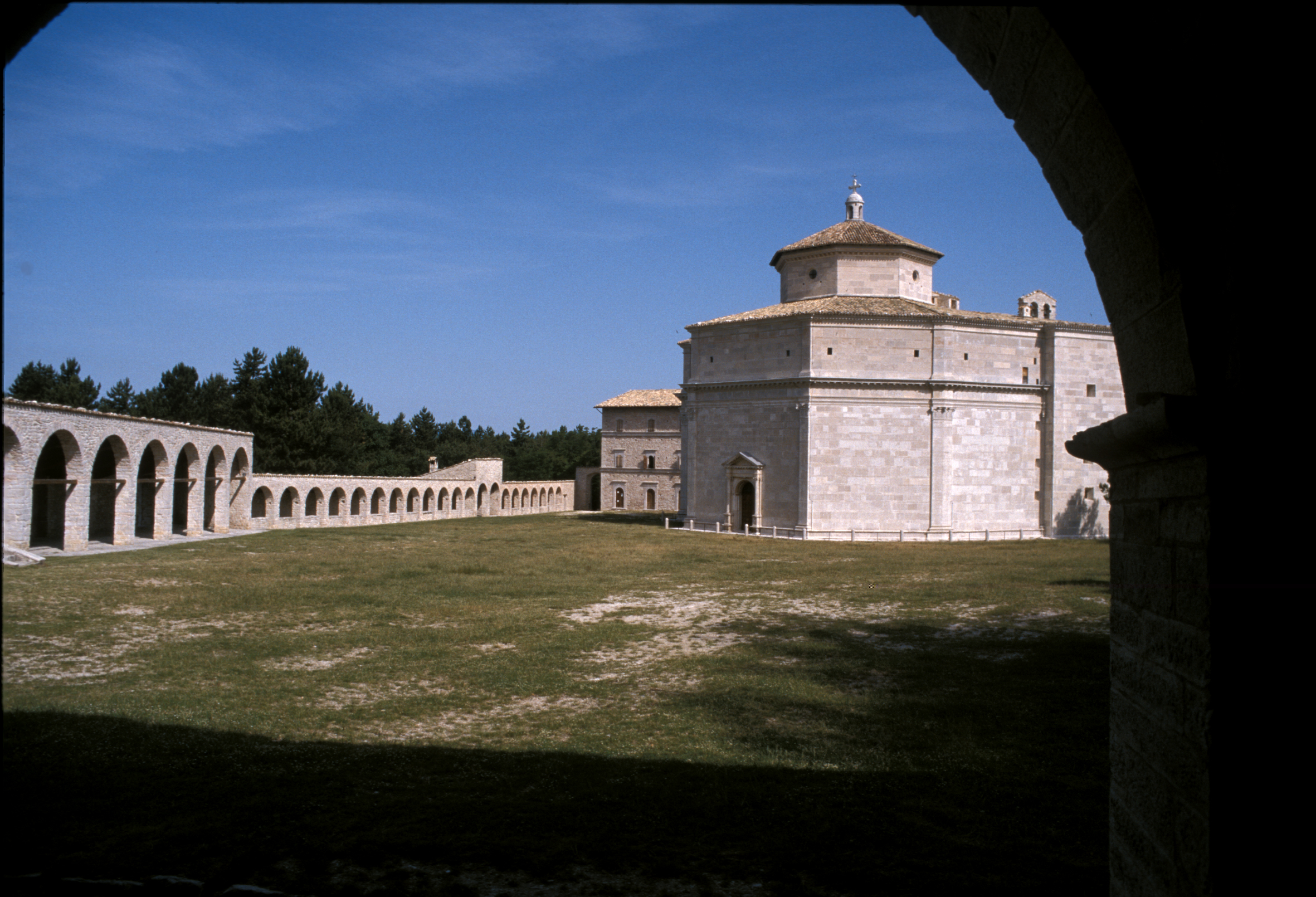
Sanctuary of Macereto.

== History ==
The sanctuary is on a site formerly occupied by the medieval castle of Macereto, built below Mount Grotagna. Its strategic position controlled intersecting routes that crossed the inhospitable Sibilline chain of the Apennine Mountains. One road runs east through Cupi, down the valley to Fiastra and from there to the eastern coast. The other road follows the spine of the mountain range to Ussita and from there, to Ascoli Piceno. At the sanctuary, the roads converge and then plunge west to Visso.

=== Routes of the Pilgrims ===
For pilgrims travelling from the west to the destination of Shrine of Loreto from the 13th century onwards, the Flaminian and Salarian roads would have been the safest and most travelled routes. Saint Basso in Cupramarittima was the stopping place along the way for pilgrims coming from the south and the Blessed Virgin in Ponte Metauro in Fano was the stopping place for those coming from the north."

In this small region, Visso and Camerino vied for control of traffic and the local population. Camerino, the older town, had a better position to control the huge number of traffic that came through the narrow pass at Muccia on the Flaminian road. The Camerinese were keen to control the routes through to southern Italy. The castle at Grotagna, that came to be called Macereto, was often disputed in the fierce rivalry with Visso, and when Pope Boniface IX placed Macereto under the jurisdiction of Visso in 1404 and then finally, in 1521, when "Duke Giovanni Maria Varano organised inspections and an in-depth study on the disagreements between the communities of Appennino, Ussita and Cupi" and a decree was issued that divided the contested land and put the hilltop of Macereto under control of Visso. Vissanis celebrated this event with the commission of the sanctuary.

=== Naming ===
Macereto as a place was first documented in 1255, when a landholder of the region, Tiboldo di Farolfo of Nocria sold this and nearby properties to Visso (Note: "[A]long with the residential castles of Nocria and Pietralata together with all the rights on its people and all its rights on Visso, Macereto, Nocelleto, Gualdo and the Villa of Aschio, on the hills and wilds and on the pastures of these castles and of the neighbouring lands and on the people of the parish and the district for the equivalent of 500 coins from Ravenna and Ancona, 40 moggi of land good for growing in Nocria, 2 moggi of land in the vineyards of Visso and a little mansion near Pontelato.") In 1259, the Count Magalotto dei Magolotti sold to Camerino a number of properties, including the Macereto Castle and its people. A rivalry between the boroughs heightened, because neither of these sales was entirely legal, since much of this desolate and barren land had never been formally recorded; thus the intramilial feud changed into an inter-communal feud.

In 1277 Visso burned down the Camerinese Apennine Castle, which was subsequently rebuilt. In 1313, Camerino destroyed the Castle of Macereto with the help of the Duke of Spoleto. This castle was also rebuilt.

Pope Boniface IX tried to mediate, assigning the Rocca di Macereto to the Counts Bante and Apollonio, sons of the papal notary Cataldino Boncompagni. By the end of the 14th century, the Boncompagni left the isolated Castle of Macereto and moved to Visso. In 1499 in one of the ensuing battles, the Camerinese killed Cataldino Boncompagni, forcing the family to emigrate and sell off the title to Visso. This left Castle of Macereto under the official control of Visso. They were to be linked again when in 1583 Pope Gregory XIII, from the same Boncompagni family, honoured his familial roots by making Visso a permanent base for the Government.

In 1521, the issued decree and truce ended the disputes over the land, with "the verdict agreed and sworn upon by Sir Venanzio Cistofori, legal authority of Camerino and by Sir Gianpietro Dominici, legal authority of Visso". In 1522, having set up the new borders with Camerino and achieving domination over the area with a final decisive victory over another rival borough of Nursini in the battle of Pian Ferduto, "Visso was then able to make use of its freedom and new security to realize the long planned project and build at Macereto, a great and artistic sanctuary."

== Origin of the Sanctuary ==
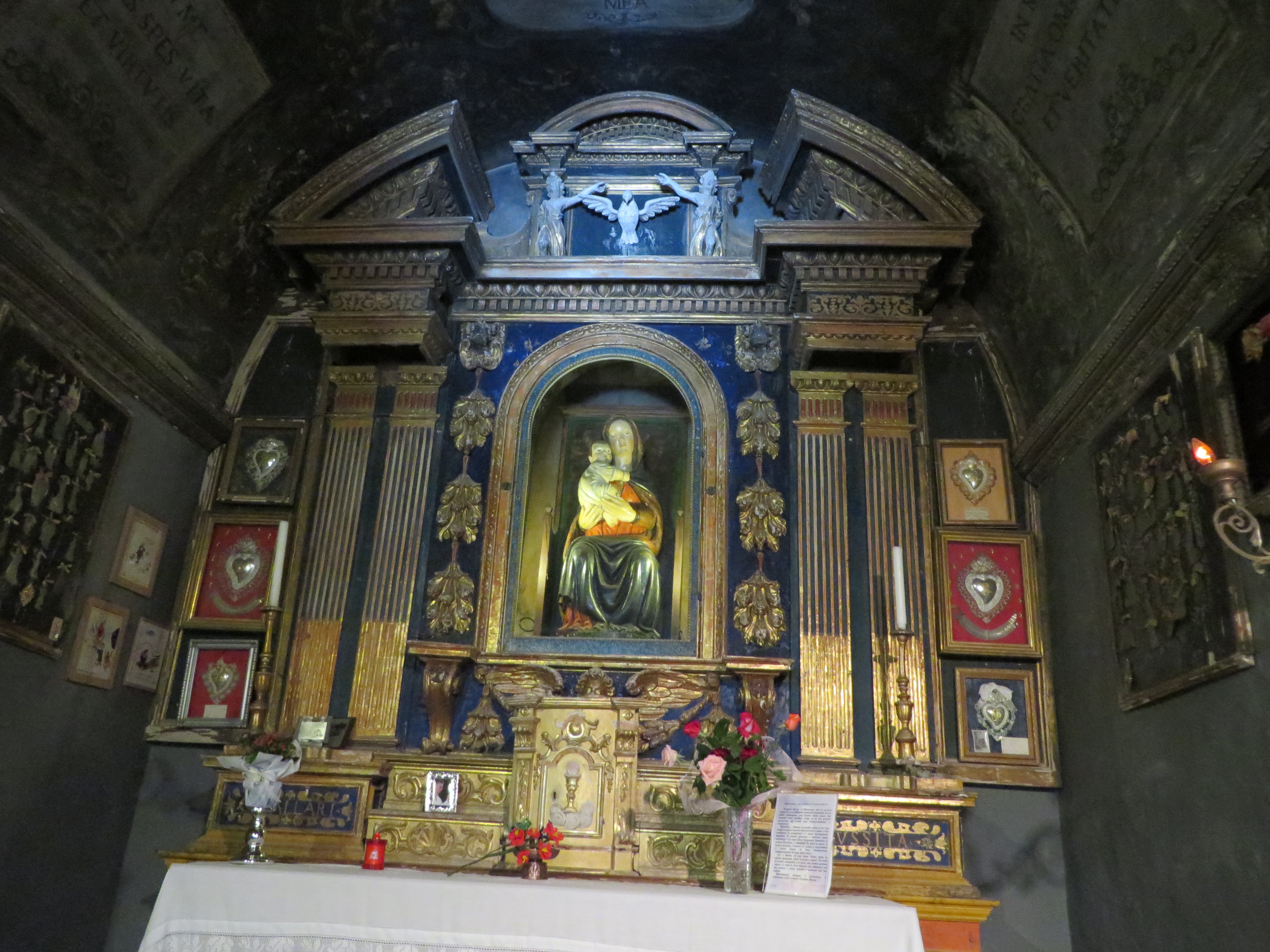
Statue of Our Lady of Macereto

The Macereto plateau had been grazing lands for shepherds transiting from Mounts Sibillini to the territories of Visso and Norcia, and the Roman plains, between the end of September and the beginning of May. In the Macereto plain, flocks could come and graze without encroaching on each other. This led to annual summer sheep fairs (fiere), which continues to this day.

The altopiano of Macereto was also traversed by a road running from the Marche to the Kingdom of Naples. With the increasing flow of pilgrims, the fiera of Macereto gained importance. A small shrine likely already existed at the spot before the miracle, tended by the shepherds.

The sanctuary at Macereto supposedly was erected after a miracle. A wooden statue of the Madonna and Child (Madonna di Macereto) by an unknown master was being transported across the mountains as a gift from the Marca di Ancona to the Kingdom of Naples. On 12 August 1356, the animal that hauled the wagon with the statue halted here at Macereto, a spot the Madonna putatively chose. This sweet and sentimental style of carving was popular in The Marche; similar statues exist in Castel Sant'Angelo, Caldarola, Visso, Preci, Camerino and Sarnarno. It is unclear if the sculptor derives from Umbria or Siena.

By 1414, miraculous healings had been attributed to the statue; for example, one Angelo di Forsivo had regained sight in the presence of the statue. The chiesetta became filled with ex-voto gifts and many tokens were also given to the church of Santa Maria in Visso. By 1486, the chiesetta was a common stop on the pilgrimage route to Loreto. (The Church did not approve of Loreto as a place of pilgrimage itself until 1507). "With a legal testament made on the 29 April 1486, a certain Clemente di Arbe sent in his place a person to complete a devout pilgrimage and he exhorted him, after to have been to Assisi, to continue for Saint Maria di Loreto, taking the route of the Valnerina, with pause at Macereto."

The shrine became the recipient of donations and inheritances, and was the focus of local devotion. In 1480 the people of Ussita were exhorted to visit the church "at least once a month between the months of April and September. Failure to visit the church would incur a charge of 10 soldi. Also, everyone from the castle owner to the labourer has to sing during the mass and take part in prayers." Important visitors began to arrive on pilgrimages as recorded on the temple stone, "prodigiorum pompa culture populum illustres principes frequenter viros traxit ad se" and on 12 August 1464 it was recorded that "between the pilgrims there were cardinals Marco Rovere and Teodoro Leli", also, in 1503 "when Pope Alessandro VI died, the tyrannical Duke Valentino took over the area near Visso. The bishops from Umbria, in return, pilgrim to Macereto and the bishops and priest from Camerino were asking our powerful Queen for a new Pope and peace for the Church." On 12 August 1520, "within the crowd and the famous pilgrims was Marca Niccolo Bonafede, bishop of Chiusi".

In 1510, the fame of the Madonna of Macereto motivated the Duke of Camerino, Giovanni Maria Varano and his party, to move the statue from Macereto to Camerino. The Vissani however intercepted the party at the Varenesi crossing. In the ensuing battle, the statue was irreparably damaged. The Bishop Bonafede of Chiusi intervened, and by 1517 he helped the presbytery of Visso to apply to have the Macereto chapel under the local government and persuaded Varano to define a borders between Camerino and Visso. Once the legal rights to the land were secure, the Vissani swiftly planned for a sanctuary to encompass the chiesetta. The Capitolo della Collegiata of Visso, who previously administered the chiesetta, was entrusted to raise funds from three sources: income earned from the land that was already owned by the sanctuary, money from the four collection boxes placed in the church made up the second part and the third section comprised donations and gifts that were streaming in from outside the church itself. As soon as it was known that there was to be a marvellous sanctuary built, the local population began donating great sums of money to the project. Naturally most of the money came from wealthy patrons. Connected with The Church, these donations assuaged the guilt perhaps felt by the very rich. In this case, the donations were carried along on the "fiume delle lane" (Don Sante Deuteri - interview) that had brought huge wealth to the landlords of the region.

This ambitious project was carried out by sizable donations of Visso, left after pilgrimages and endowments by the devout, like Cristoforo Pierangel from Ussita, who died in 1524 "near the sanctuary where he had gone in ill health". By the 1520s there were so many donations coming in that it was said, "there were no wills done that would not leave something towards the construction of that church". The Collegiata administered the funds until 1562 when irregularities were noted, for example, "apparently in good will, 47 scudi coming from Macereto were spent to buy a new floor in Santa Maria of Visso." The Priori of Visso were then given the administration responsibilities and they in turn would report to the Collegiata.

On 26 September 1586 Pope Sixtus V issued a document that made the situation official through a "transaction that took place on 12 December 1583 between Church and Community leaders of Visso... Amongst other things, the way that the expenses towards the maintenance of the church people in service in Macereto were dealt with, their rights and duties, the responsibilities of the Priori for all expenses – which they could not authorize without orders and planning from the architects, failure to do so would have resulted in them being held responsible with their own belongings – all came under strict regulations."

== The Architects of the Sanctuary ==
In 1527 the Collegiata and the Commune of Visso entrusted Master Gian Battista da Bissone with the design of the Sanctuary. He had designed and built Palazzo Ottoni (1452) and Palazzo Piersanti in nearby Matelica. Also involved was Master Filippo Salvi from Melide, Switzerland who had worked on the Santa Maria della Consolazione (Todi) at Todi. Some theorize the original circular design was by Donato Bramante. But Bramante, Salvi and Gian Battista da Lugano all fled Lombardy at about the same time.

The facts are that when Bramante went to Milan in 1480, where he was employed on creating the dome for the church of Santa Maria delle Grazie. "By 1490, centralized structures not unlike those of Bramante's St. Peter's or Santa Maria della Consolazione at Todi had appeared amongst Leonardo's sketches."

The pragmatics of building a symmetrical church are challenged by the cost. Presuming that one solved the placement of the main altar, another unanswered question is where to put the campanile. Bramante's Tempietto did not pose this dilemma since it did not require one; for St Peter's Basilica, cost was not an issue, so a campanile at each 'corner' was planned (which was Leonardo's vision, see fig). The clearest illustration of an attempt to deal with the campanile question in a church outside Rome is the sanctuary of Santa Maria della Consolazione at Todi which in fact is not even clearly attributed to Bramante, although Bruschi does list references to Bramante in connection with it.

"Typically understood as a simplification of his plan for St Peter's, there is evidence for Bramante's participation in its design at some level. The design, after all, has much in common with the Leonardesque themes that Bramante brought with him from Milan. Above all, the Consolazione's pristine combination of cube, drum, dome and apses shows its origins in the sketches by Leonardo that were central to his development as an artist (fig)...Though in most respects the ideas of Bramante are undeniably present, the flaccid orders on the exterior of this otherwise impressive church suggests that he may not have participated directly in its execution".

The connection between the sanctuary of Santa Maria della Consolazione and that at Macereto is evident in architectural details and motifs. As at Todi, the Macereto sanctuary is centrally planned, built on a Greek cross system within an octagonal drum. Todi was also built to house a relic that would have been placed in a small chapel beneath the central dome as at Macereto. The architect who had worked on both buildings was Master Filippo Salvi da Meli who worked with Gian Battista da Lugano and it was Gian Battista who remained in charge of the construction until his untimely death in 1539 when he fell from a scaffold whilst completing the arches of the temple.

Bramante's influence is everywhere and most people writing about the sanctuary mention him at some point, even if only to say that the building is Bramantesque. In his The temple of the Madonna of Macereto. Malpeli claims "the temple of Macereto was heavily influenced by Bramante, especially in the decorative vibrations which were very particular. This is why we were allowed to say that the monument is of a Bramantesque style. The paternity of the temple has to be given to the architect Battista Lugano, especially for the general idea and the more constructive part, which was getting away from the minimalism that is found in Bramante's work."

The imposing exterior walls of the sanctuary are almost entirely undecorated. There are three great, classically inspired doors with pedimented arches decorated with columns with Doric capitols. Unadorned white stone walls rise to the cornice that is also simply decorated with Corinthian columns. The outside of the building remains unfinished as work had to be stopped in 1566 when the builders discovered that the ground would not support the external dome or a campanile. It is the interior however, that bears such a striking resemblance to the interiors of both Santa Maria della Consolazione and Santa Maria at Loreto.

All three buildings have a great dome above sacred image. In the case of the Santa Maria della Consolazione, the image has ended up in one of the semicircular apses, but it is this church that has the architectonic connections with the sanctuary of Macereto. Four main pillars that are connected by great arches, which are decorated identically, support the central dome. The arches are decorated with coffers with rosettes. Both churches have the same decorations and it is this style that links the Todi and Macereto sanctuaries, pointed out by most commentators. It would have been Master Filippo Salvi, working on both projects, who would have used this technique. These two great Marian sanctuaries of the cinquecento in central Italy correspond with each other because of the actual connection provided by Salvi but they were also representative of the spirit of the age. And even if it was not actually Donato Bramante who had submitted the original drawings for the buildings, it is undeniable that his presence is in both structures.

At the sanctuary in Loreto, the dome and shrine are at the eastern end of a conventional church built in the oblong model of the basilica. But once one comes to the focus of the church, the tiny capella that houses the Santa Casa, the relationship between this and the sanctuary at Macereto is clear. The 'original' home of the Virgin Mary was transported first from Galilee to Dalmatia and then, in 1294 across to the bandit-infested laurel grove above Porto Recanati, hence the name 'Loreto'. It would not be until about two hundred years later, in 1507 that the Church approved of Loreto as a place of pilgrimage and the work began, which was around the same time as the construction of the sanctuaries of both Todi and Macereto.

Whilst it is apparent that more money came to Loreto and so the Santa Casa is visibly more splendid, the decoration of the inner chapels are very similar and it is generally agreed that the chiesetta at Macereto echoes that of Loreto. A simple white stone and marble rectangular shell surrounds the original building that contains the image.

It was Bramante who had handed in the original designs for the shrine at Loreto but had had very little to do with it after that, the job having been taken on by the great medal designer Gian Cristoforo Romano, Andrea Sansovino and Antonio da Sangallo the Younger. It is a good example of High Renaissance Architecture, combining the elegance and simplicity of the classical lines and motifs with rich encrustations of statues and other decoration. The basic design of the Santa Casa resonates in the chiesetta at Macereto. The cornice is decorated with a simple Greek key design, below which hang swags. The columns, in bas-relief at Macereto are lighter and more minimal than the pomp and splendour of those at Loreto. Where the statues of the prophets seated around the lower level of the shrine at Loreto (highly reminiscent of Michelangelo's prophets in the Medici tomb in Florence) are, at Macereto there are empty niches. Whether there were plans to install any statues is not known. The outer walls of the Santa Casa are covered with relief work, statues and other decoration, there is very little empty space, as if the three artists commissioned to complete the building could not resist making yet another addition. As a result it comes across as being rather overloaded in contrast to the delicate simplicity of Macereto's chiesetta.

If we work on the assumption that the sanctuary at Macereto was one of the officially recognised stop-overs on one of the major pilgrimage routes to Loreto it is tempting to view the construction of the chiesetta as being something that would not only connect the two sanctuaries by visible association but also serve to keep the pilgrims minded of their eventual destination. The architectural motifs and style of the two - churches-within-churches - are rare and bear such a striking resemblance to one another that with the suggestion that Donato Bramante may have had a hand in the design of both. At some stage, it would hint that there is more to connect them than the fact that they are both Marian shrines. Added to this, both Todi and Macereto sanctuaries are centrally planned 'temples'of the High Renaissance, a time when The Church was eager to convince a population shaken by the steady drip of the Reformation that there was only one true Church.

The connection between the sanctuaries at Macereto and Todi is also clear in the documents and also the treatment of other architectural details, I have used this to indicate the link between the architects, with Filippo Salvi as the 'go-between' for Bramante. The importance of this sanctuary and perhaps the reason why it was valued so highly was that it contained the holy statue, a physical representation of a miracle that in turn stood for the victory of one powerful and rich merchant town over its more ancient and venerable neighbour.
