= Sibyl's Cave =

Cave in Marche region, Italy

- Grotta della Sibilla (Italian)
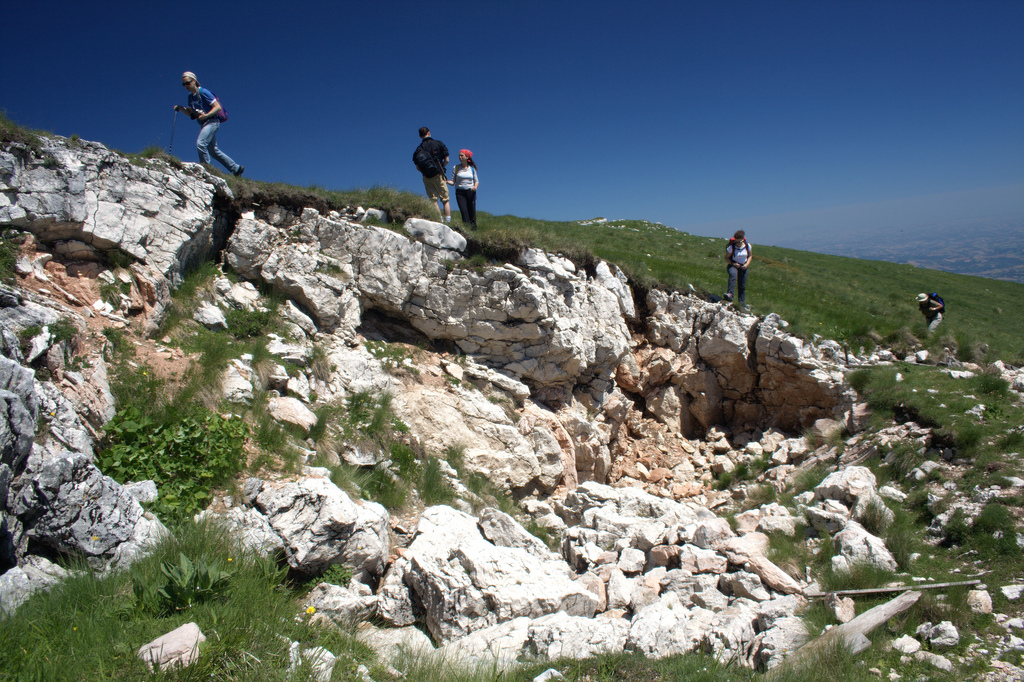
- Entrance to the cave

- Location within Italy
- Location: Montemonaco, Marche, Italy
- Coordinates: 42°54′00″N 13°15′56″E
- Elevation: 2,150 metres (7,050 ft)

Sibyl's Cave (Italian: Grotta della Sibilla) is a cave, located at 2,150 m above sea level, carved into the rock, near the summit of Sibillini Mountains in the municipality of Montemonaco, reachable only on foot.

== Description ==
There, above the peaks of the wild Apennines,
Between the steep cliffs a cave appears;
The sirens keep watch over that lighthouse,
The songs tremble and make one delirious.

— Translated from the Italian poem Sibilla by Giulio Aristide Sartorio

The cave owes its name to the legend of the Apennine Sibyl, according to which it was the access point to the underground kingdom of Queen Sibilla.

Andrea da Barberino, with his chivalric novel Il Guerrin Meschino, contributed to the popularization of the legend. It tells the story of a wandering knight who went to the Sibyl to find his parents. For a year, he stayed in the cave and resisted, with all his strength, the temptations by invoking the name of Jesus of Nazareth.

According to numerous philologists, the legend of the Apennine Sibyl is believed to have significantly influenced the German legend of Tannhäuser. This theory is based on the numerous parallels observed between these two narratives and the story of Guerin Meschino.

The underground complex was described, for the first time in 1420, by Antoine de la Sale who went to the cave on the orders of Duchess Agnes of Burgundy. However, due to the landslides that had occurred in the early Middle Ages inside the cave, he could only draw (with rare precision) the topographical plan of the vestibule of the cave which is still preserved intact. This document is preserved in the National Library of France.

In the mid-20th century, Lippi-Boncambi provided a recent and reliable description of the cave, which largely aligns with the earlier account by de la Sale. Lippi-Boncambi was among the final visitors to the cave prior to the collapse of its entrance. This unfortunate event was precipitated by the imprudent use of explosives, intended to widen the entrance, but instead resulted in its permanent closure.

== Chronology of visits to the cave ==
- 69 AD - The first news comes from Suetonius when he says that Vitellius "celebrated a sacred vigil on the slopes of the Apennines".
- 268 AD - According to Trebellius Pollio’s Scriptores Historiae Augustae, Claudius Gothicus is said to have sought guidance from the oracle of the Apennine Sibyl.
- 1320 - 1340 - The visit of the German knight, Her Hans van Bamborg, to the Sibilla cave can be dated back to 1338, as documented by Antoine de la Sale in his work, Le Paradis de la reine Sibylle (transl. Queen Sibyl's Paradise). However, historian Domenico Falzetti suggests a different date for this visit, proposing the year 1378 instead.
- 1420 - Antoine de la Sale visited the cave in May 1420, reporting the detailed description of the morphology of the places and of the vestibule of the cave in his diary.
- 1452 - A parchment discovered in the historical archive of the municipality of Montemonaco reveals that the area, including Montemonaco, Sibilla Lake (as referred to by the judge of the Marca Anconitana), and Sibyl's cave, was frequented by knights from Spain and the Kingdom of Naples. These knights were known to practice alchemy and consecrate magical books at ‘ad lacum Sibyllae’, which would later be known as Pilate's Lake. The entire population and authorities of the municipality of Montemonaco were excommunicated and subsequently acquitted in a trial for assisting these foreign knights in reaching Sibilla Lake and the cave.
- 1578 - The year '1378' is engraved on a rock near the collapsed vestibule and remains visible today. This date, however, may have been altered from an original five, written in Arabic numerals, to a three during the 17th-18th century. This transformation was likely intended to associate the site with the birth year of Christian Rosenkreuz, suggesting the presence of the Rosicrucians in the lands of the Sibyl and their symbolic connection with the mythical cave. Symbols of roses and crosses, characteristic of the Rosicrucians, are found carved on the architraves of windows and stone portals in numerous hamlets throughout the Sibylline belt, with examples dating up to the end of the 17th century.
- 1610 - 1612 - Martino Bonfini frescoes a cycle of twelve Sibyls including one with chemistry or alchemy in the sanctuary of Madonna dell'Ambro.
- 1870 - The Caponecchi brothers from Nursi, also known as the Vezzanesi, conducted a speleological exploration of the Sibilla cave. However, their exploration did not yield significant results.
- 1885 – G.B. Miliani, precursor of modern speleology, explored the vestibule of the cave and the surrounding plain in order to find the entrance beyond the vestibule.
- 1889 - On the occasion of the 21st Congress of Italian Mountaineers, held in Ascoli Piceno, the Picena section of the Italian Alpine Club carried out maintenance and cleaning work on the cave. On September 3, in the presence of numerous congress participants who climbed to the summit of Sibilla, a commemorative plaque of the event dictated by the engineer was unveiled. The plaque remained visible on site until the end of the 1940s.
- 1897 - Intellectuals Pio Rajna and Gaston Paris made multiple visits to the Sibilla cave. They also held several meetings with the administrators of the Marche region, with the aim of raising awareness about the importance of restoring the cave.
- 1925 - An expedition, led by historian Falzetti, to the entrance of the Sibilla cave took place. The team hypothesized the existence of a continuation beyond the cave’s vestibule. This discovery garnered significant attention, prompting local residents to attempt entry into the cave. Unfortunately, these attempts were uncoordinated and resulted in damage to the cave.
- 1929 - 1930 - Belgian philologist Fernand Desonay went to the cave. At the same time, Falzetti also attempted a new expedition without success.
- 1946 - Tullio Colsalvatico initiated an exploration of the Sibilla cave, which was promptly halted by the Superintendence due to concerns about the potential use of explosives for cave penetration. Concurrently, geologist Lippi Boncampi conducted a study on karst formations in the Sibillini mountains. This study included the first official report on the underground structure of the Sibilla cave, supplemented with technical documents such as topographies, sections, and plans.
- 1952 - In an effort to boost tourism in the region, General Emidio Santanché, a diviner and the president of the Ascoli Piceno Tourist Board, embarked on an expedition to the Sibilla cave.
- 1953 - Domenico Falzetti, Fernand Desonay, and General Emidio Santanchè, along with Giovanni Annibali, the Superintendent of Archaeological Heritage, initiated a systematic excavation of the Sibilla cave. They found an inscription reading “AV. P. 1378”, along with an old knife, a spur, and a coin. The coin was identified as a double tournois of Henry II of France, dating back to the 16th century.
- 1953 - 1968 - During this period, the vestibule of the cave finally collapses and the last stone plaques, engraved with various inscriptions, still located at the entrance to the vestibule, are probably stolen.
- 1968 - It is the year of the first study campaign carried out with modern equipment, for geoelectrical surveys, conducted by the Pesaro geologist Odescalchi commissioned by the Ascoli Piceno Tourism Board. Odescalchi managed to capture some anomalies probably attributable to the existence of a tunnel beyond the vestibule of the cave.
- 1983 - 1984 - Giuseppe Antonini, a member of the Marche Speleological Group of Ancona, was tasked by the Marche Region to investigate the existence of a descending tunnel beyond the vestibule of the Sibilla cave, as reported by Odescalchi. This investigation involved explorations both at the countryside level beyond the so-called Crown that encircles the peak of Mount Sibilla and encompasses the cave, and within the Crown itself. Unfortunately, due to adverse weather conditions and challenging working circumstances, the Marche Speleological Group was compelled to abandon the venture.
- 1997 - 2000 - The "Elissa" cultural project of Montemonaco coordinated by Anna Maria Piscitelli and chaired by Paolo Aldo Rossi of the University of Genoa, started a scientific project on the Apennine Sibyl and her cave. Between 1998 and 2000, a series of three conferences and multiple round tables were organized. These events saw the participation of renowned scholars from both national and international backgrounds. The primary objective was to compile a comprehensive corpus of historical, literary, and anthropological data related to the myth of the Sibilla cave. Additionally, the scientific findings from previous investigations into the cave were also gathered.
- 2000 - The Grotta della Sibilla appenninica Promotion Committee, with the patronage of the Archaeological Superintendency of the Marche, with the participation of the Department of Earth Sciences of the University of Camerino, promoted geological and geophysical investigations at the "Grotta della Sibilla" site. The results of the georadar surveys confirmed the existence of a vast underground complex at a depth of 15 meters below the ground level, made up of labyrinthine tunnels and notable cavities approximately 150 m long. The summary of the studies was published in the proceedings of the conference 'Shaman Sibilla of the mountains and the Apennine cave'.

== See also ==
- Sibillini Mountains
- Monte Sibilla
- Cumaean Sibyl
