= Acquacanina =

Frazione of Fiastra, Italy

Locator map of Acquacanina, Marche, Italy.

Acquacanina is a frazione (hamlet) of the comune of Fiastra within the Province of Macerata in the Italian region Marche. It is located about 70 kilometres (43 mi) southwest of Ancona, and about 40 kilometres (25 mi) southwest of Macerata. The municipal seat is in the frazione of Piè del Colle.

The 49th International Six Days Trial went through the village; it was considered especially dangerous due to "poor organization + rocks + speed," resulting in one motorcyclist from Germany breaking his wrist in an accident there.

It was an autonomous comune until 31 December 2016.

Most of the town is located within the Parco Nazionale dei Monti Sibillini.

== Main sights ==
- Santa Maria in Rio Sacro, Acquacanina - Benedictine abbey church
- Chiesa della Madonna del Vallone

== See also ==
- Monti Sibillini
