= Laga Basin =

Apennine foreland basin

The Laga Basin is the largest and youngest foreland basin of the Central Apennines fold and thrust belt. It is Messinian in age and serves as a link between an Early Miocene aged fold and thrust belt in the west of the Central Apennines and a younger belt to the east. In the 1980s and 1990s, it was the subject of numerous investigations for hydrocarbon resources, and has since become a valuable analogue with relation to clastic reservoirs developed in confined structural settings.

== Tectonic setting ==
The Laga Basin is positioned at the easternmost edge of Italy, where the collision of the Adria and Eurasian plates led to the formation of the Central Apennine Mountains.

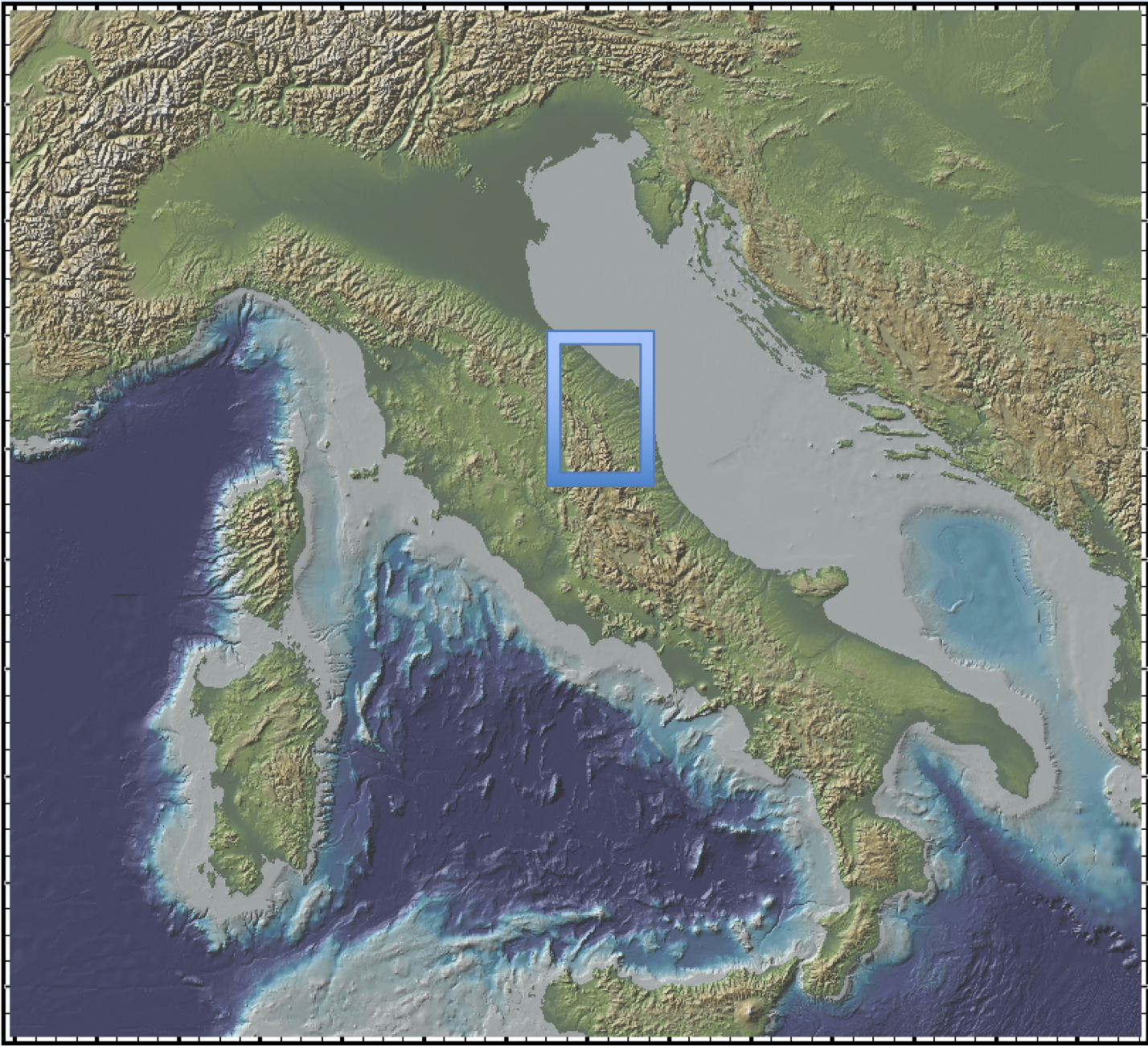

To the south, the Laga Basin is bound by the Grand Sasso Thrust. The Mt. Gorgonza thrust stems from the Grand Sasso, and is a central feature of the Laga Basin's history. To the west, it is bound by the Sibillini Mountains. A homocline consisting of Pliocene-Pleistocene aged deposits that dip toward the Adriatic sea marks the northern and eastern boundaries of the basin. In the central portion of the basin, there are two anticlines with north to south orientations; these are known as the Montagnia de Fiori anticline and the Acqusanta anticline.

== Stratigraphy ==
Underlying the Laga Basin are the remnants of the Marnoso-arnacea foreland basin. These units include dolomites, evaporites, the Calcare Massicio Formation, the Umbria-Marche Pelagic succession, and the Cerrogna and Orbulina Marls. The main stratigraphic formation of the Laga Basin is the Laga Formation.

=== The Laga Formation ===
There is disagreement among geologists on how many units the Laga Formation should contain, but it is widely recognized that it is broken down into at least three units; a pre-evaporitic unit, an evaporitic unit, and a post-evaporitic unit. This sequence is known as "the Messinian Trilogy", and often these units are referred to as Laga 1, Laga 2, and Laga 3.

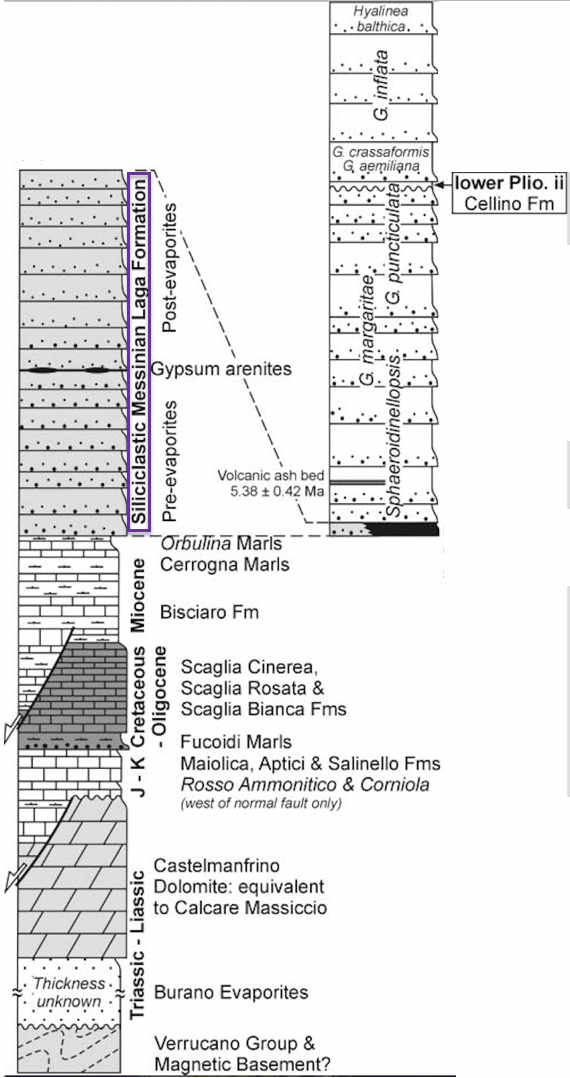
Stratigraphic column showing the different units present in the Laga Basin

Laga 1 and Laga 2 were deposited during the Tortonian-Early Messinian and represent the closing of the former basin. These two units combined are commonly referred to as the Laga Depositional Sequence (LDS). Laga 3 was deposited during the Late Messinian and is a part of the Cellino Depositional Sequence (CDS), which also includes the Vomano marls and the Cellino formation. The lithology of all three units consists of siliciclastic marine turbidites. These had the tendency to deposit in lobes and today, many of these lobes can be seen confined in erosional depressions within the basin.

== Geologic history ==
=== Structural evolution of the Laga Basin ===
Tectonic activity from the Grand Sasso and Sibillini Mountains caused the Teramo thrust in the eastern portion of the Laga Basin to become active during the lower Messinian. Fault activity remained active throughout deposition of Laga 1 and Laga 2. Sediment influx came into the mostly barren basin from the northwestern sector. However, by the time Laga 2 was deposited, the Acquasanta anticline had developed in the central portion of the Laga Basin and resulted in the turbidites having to be deposited around it. This led to more defined lobe structures.

Eventually, resultant deformation from the Teramo thrust activity became concentrated inside the fault's hanging wall. This ultimately led to the propagation of the Mt. Gorgonza and Montagnia de Fiori thrusts. During this time that Laga 3 was deposited. A new subsidence area began forming in the footwall of the Teramo thrust as uplift continued along the basin. After deposition of Laga 3, an overfilling of the basin took place, and this subsidence area was filled in by the Verano Marls and the Cellino Formation.

=== Provenance of turbidite sediments ===
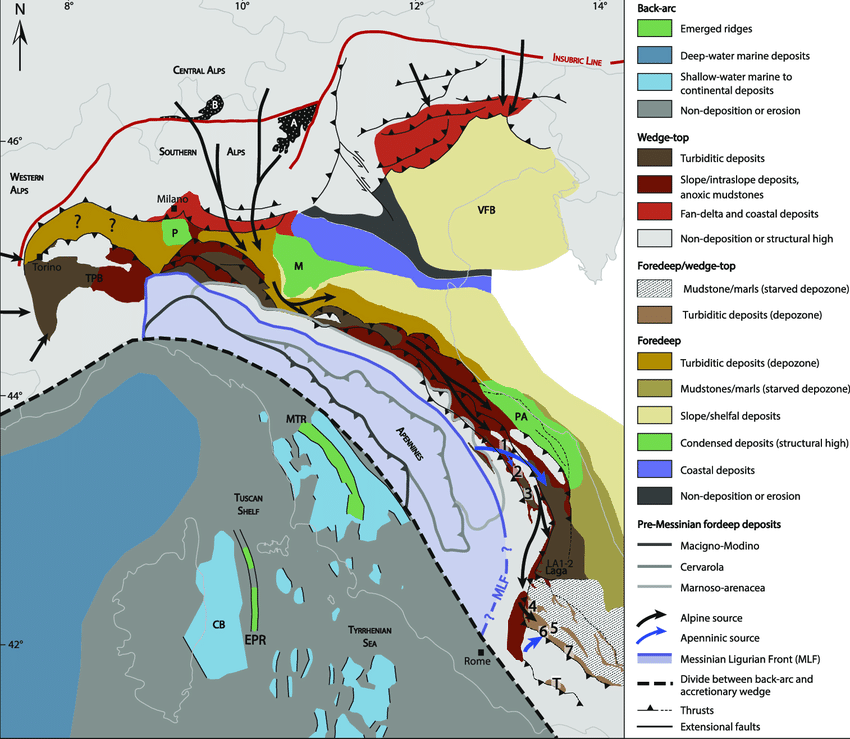
Structural Map of the Alps and Apennines showing the proposed pathways and sources for sediment dispersal

While there have been many studies done on the structural setting and hydrocarbon potential of the Laga Basin, much less work has been accomplished on the front of sediment provenance. Petrographic studies have indicated that the Ligurian nappes, in the Northwestern Apennines, have likely acted as a sediment source for the Messinian turbidites at some point in the past. More recent studies, however, assert that the central and southern portions of the Alps acted as the two main sediment sources for the basin at the time of the Laga Formation's deposition. However, these studies were performed using only the analysis of detrital zircons, and may be biased toward silica saturated rock types.
