= Visso =

- Comune
- Comune di Visso
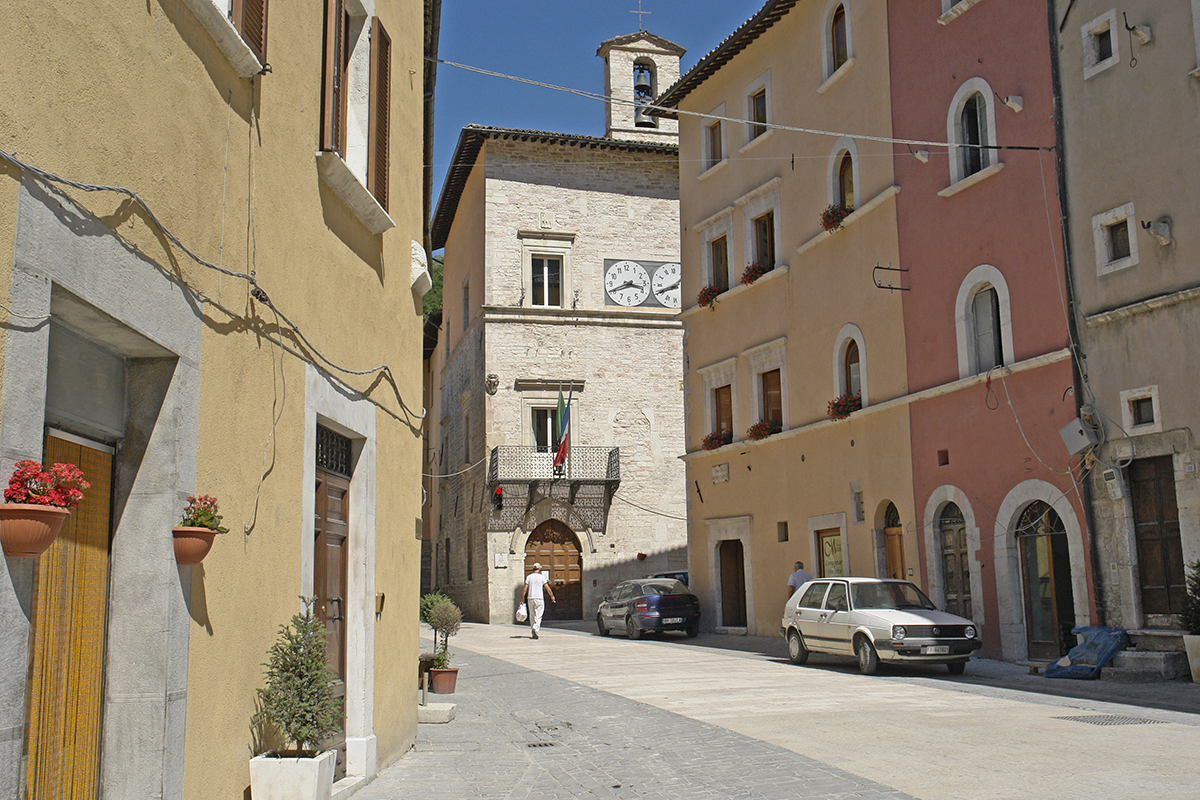

- Coat of arms

- Location within Italy Location within Marche
- Coordinates: 42°56′N 13°5′E
- Country: Italy
- Region: Marche
- Province: Macerata (MC)
- Frazioni: Aschio, Borgo San Giovanni, Croce, Cupi, Fematre, Macereto, Mevale, Molini di Visso, Orvano, Pieve, Ponte Chiusita, Rasenna, Riofreddo, Villa Sant'Antonio

Government
  - Mayor: Giuliano Pazzaglini

Area
  - Total: 100.4 km^{2} (38.8 sq mi)

Population (28 February 2017)
  - Total: 1,103
  - Density: 10.99/km^{2} (28.45/sq mi)
- Demonym: Vissani
- Time zone: UTC+1 (CET)
  - Summer (DST): UTC+2 (CEST)
- Postal code: 62039
- Dialing code: 0737
- Patron saint: St. John the Baptist
- Saint day: 24 June
- Website: Official website

Visso is a comune (municipality) in the Province of Macerata in the Italian region Marche, located about 80 kilometres (50 mi) southwest of Ancona and about 50 kilometres (31 mi) southwest of Macerata. It houses the seat of Monti Sibillini National Park. It is one of I Borghi più belli d'Italia ("The most beautiful villages of Italy").

== Main sights ==
- San Giacomo church and monastery
- Chiesa del Santissimo Redentore e Santa Maria
- Chiesa della Concezione
- Chiesa della Madonna di Cardosa
- Sant'Agostino
- Sant'Antonio
- San Francesco
- San Lorenzo
- Santa Maria Annunziata di Mevale
- Santa Maria Assunta
- Santa Maria delle Cave
- Santa Maria delle Grazie
- Collegiata di Santa Maria
- Sant'Agostino Secondo
- Santuario di Macereto

== See also ==
- Camerino
- Monti Sibillini
