= Santissimo Redentore =

Santissimo Redentore may refer to the following churches in Italy:

- Santissimo Redentore a Valmelaina, church in Rome
- Santissimo Redentore e Santa Maria, Visso, church in Visso

== See also ==
- Il Redentore
