= Il Guerrin Meschino =

Italian prose chivalric romance by Andrea da Barberino

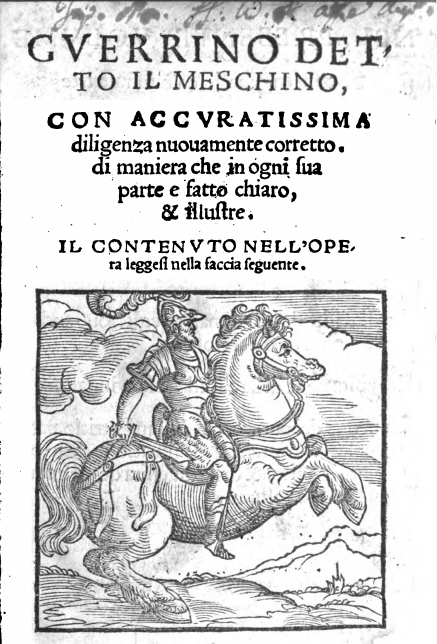
Copertina Guerrin Meschino

Il Guerrin Meschino ("Wretched Guerrin") is an Italian prose chivalric romance with some elements of verisimilitude, written by the Italian cantastorie, systematizer and translator from French Andrea da Barberino, who completed it about 1410.

The text in eight chapter-length books circulated widely in manuscript before its first printing, in Padua, in 1473. It was a late contribution to the "Matter of France" that appealed to aristocratic audiences and their emulators among the upper bourgeoisie. In a departure from Andrea's other known romances, there are no discernible French or Franco-Venetian sources for this narrative, which unfolds instead in the manner of a travel account. It draws for its details on a variety of predecessors, such as, for the oracular Trees of the Sun and the Moon, the Alexander romances, and—outside the romance tradition—on Dante's Divine Comedy, on the "natural history" found in medieval bestiaries, and on the legend of the Purgatory of St. Patrick and the cosmology of Ptolemy. The quest involved is the rootless Guerrino's search for his lost parents. There is an undercutting element of deconstruction of chivalrous ideals apparent from the very title: Guerrino derives from guerra "war", but meschino means, "shabby, paltry, ignoble"; the hero, cast away as a babe sold by pirates and rebaptized by his foster father Meschino, the "unlucky", rises through his heroic efforts to his proper status as Guerr[i]ero, "warrior". At the end of his adventures Guerrino discovers that he is the son of Milone, Duke of Durazzo, who was himself the son of a Duke of Burgundy, so that Guerrino is of royal blood.

Guerrino is the sole protagonist; other characters exist only insofar as they encounter him.

The far-ranging episodes create a fictional geography as seen from the Mediterranean world. Guerrin's enchanted sojourn in the cave of the Sibyl bears parallels with the Germanic traditions of Tannhäuser. Prester John plays a role, offering Guerrin the signoria over half of all India, following a battle. Most of the challenges Guerrin faces, however, are moral rather than military, even where the supernatural character of the site is explicitly non-Christian, such as the sanctuary of the Trees of the Sun and Moon. Like Dante, he was granted a view of Purgatory, the Purgatorio di San Patrizio.

The work has had a checkered career under the scrutiny of the Church. Many modern editions reprint the bowdlerized Venetian edition of 1785, pubblicata con licenza dei superiori, which suppressed all mention of the Sibilla Apenninica sited in a grotto on Monte Sibilla in the Apennines, substituting various Italian circumlocutions: Fata, Fatalcina, Ammaliatrice, Incantatrice, etc. An entire chapter, Book V, in which the Apennine Sibyl describes the other classical Sibyls, was completely suppressed. Astronomical references were also deleted by the censor. A critical text, based on Florentine Quattrocento manuscripts, was edited by Paola Moreno, and published in 2005.

The work was so popular that it was translated for a Spanish audience by Alonso Hernández Alemán, as Guarino Mezquino; by the time it was printed in Castilian in 1512 it had received 21 printings in Italian. It had staying power, too: the literary Venetian courtesan Tullia d'Aragona rendered it in epic verse, now "most chaste, all pure, all Christian," as Il Meschino, altramente detto il Guerrino (Venice 1560, 2nd ed. 1594), though the source she acknowledged to the reader was the perhaps more respectable Amadis de Gaula. Mozart's librettist Lorenzo da Ponte was inspired by Il Guerrin Meschino as an adolescent. In the 19th and 20th centuries, episodes from Il Guerrin Meschino have been adapted for the Italian stage, and even for children.

Le Meravigliose avventure di Guerrin Meschino is a 1951 Italian film that takes its general tenor from the romance. Guerrin was adapted twice for the Italian comic books called fumetti, once in 1959 in 17 installments under the title Guerino detto il Meschino and again running in the Corriere dei Piccoli. Guerin Sportivo, an Italian sport and satirical weekly magazine founded in 1912 in Turin, takes its title from the protagonist.

== Editions ==
- Il Guerrin meschino (Padua: Bartholomeo de Valdezoccho & Martin de Septem Arboribus, 1473)
- Guerino il Meschino (Bologna: Baldassarre Azzoguidi, 1475)
- Guerino il Meschino (Venice: Gerardo de Lisa, 1477)
- Guerrino detto Meschino (Venice: Alexandro de Bindoni, 1512)
- Guerrino detto il Meschino (Venice: 1567)
- Guerino detto il Meschino (Venice: Tipografia Molinari, 1826)
- Guerrino detto il Meschino (Naples: Ferdinando Bideri, 1893)
- Guerrino detto il Meschino (Rome: Nuove edizioni romane, 1993)
- Il Guerrin Meschino (Rome & Padua: critical edition, Antenore, 2005)
