= Madonna del Vallone, Acquacanina =

Church in Macerata province, Italy

Coordinates: 43°01′43.0″N 13°10′42.0″E

The Chiesa della Madonna del Vallone is a Roman Catholic church or sanctuary located in a rural site in the frazione of Piedicolle in Acquacanina, province of Macerata, in the region of Marche, Italy. It is located within the Parco Nazionale dei Monti Sibillini.

== History ==
This marian shrine was completed in 1747, likely at the site of a chapel or aedicule. The main altarpiece depicts the Madonna and Child. Documents recall a church at the site by 1624. The church also has paintings both from the 20th century and a Deposition attributed to Lorenzo Garbieri.
