= Monte Prata =

Mountain in Italy

- Location within Italy

Highest point
- Elevation: 1,800 m (5,900 ft)
- Coordinates: 42°52′32″N 13°12′29″E

Geography
- Location: Marche, Italy
- Parent range: Apennines

Monte Prata is a mountain of Marche, Italy. Located in the comune of Castelsantangelo sul Nera, there is a ski resort on the mountain.
