= Sant'Agostino, Visso =

Church in Visso, Italy

Coordinates: 42°55′53.54″N 13°5′13.73″E

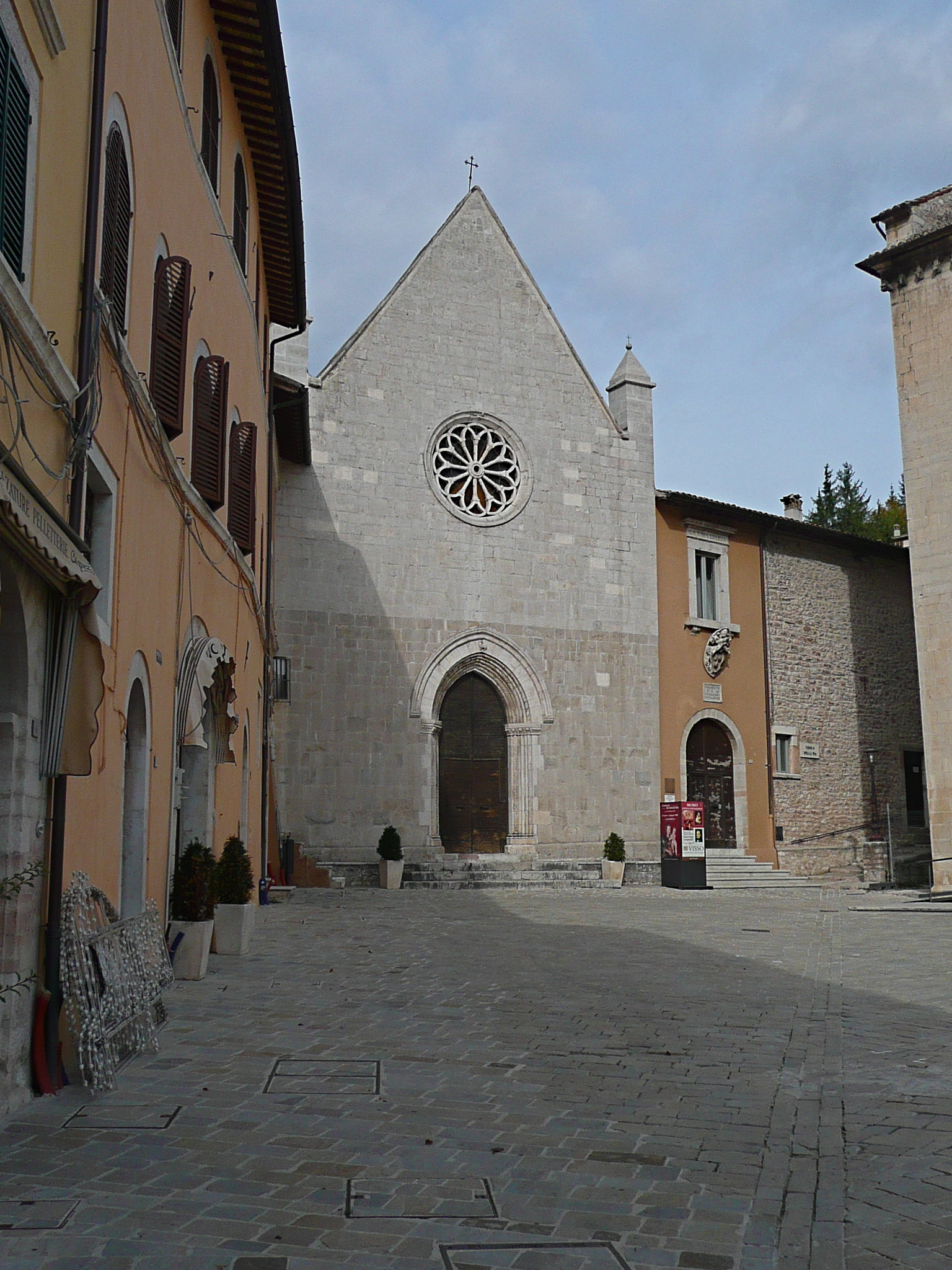
The facade of the church

Sant'Agostino is a Gothic-style, deconsecrated Roman Catholic church located in the town of Visso, province of Macerata, region of Marche, Italy.

== History ==
The church building was erected in 1338, adjacent to the Collegiata in the town. The exterior façade, made with large white stone bricks, is generally undecorated but for an ogival arch and main portal and a delicately ribbed rose window with twelve spokes.

By the 17th century, the complex housed the seminary, and between 1860 and 1901, it housed the town Gymnasium (school). It is now part of the town's museums with occasional parish functions. The church and sacristy are used by the Museo Civico Diocesano.

The museum contains approximately 130 works including canvases, frescoes, terracotta, wood statues, engraved tabernacles, and precious religious items including crucifixes, candelabra, calyxes, reliquaries, and apparel. Featured in the collection are works mainly from artists active in the region, including works by Paolo da Visso, called il maestro della Valnerina; a wooden statue by the Master of the Madonna di Macereto; and paintings by Gaspare Angelucci. Other works include paintings by Simone de Magistris, Carlo Cignani, Domenico Alfani, and Antonio Viviani. The museum contains original manuscripts by Giacomo Leopardi.
