= San Paolo, Fiastra =

Church in Fiastra, Italy

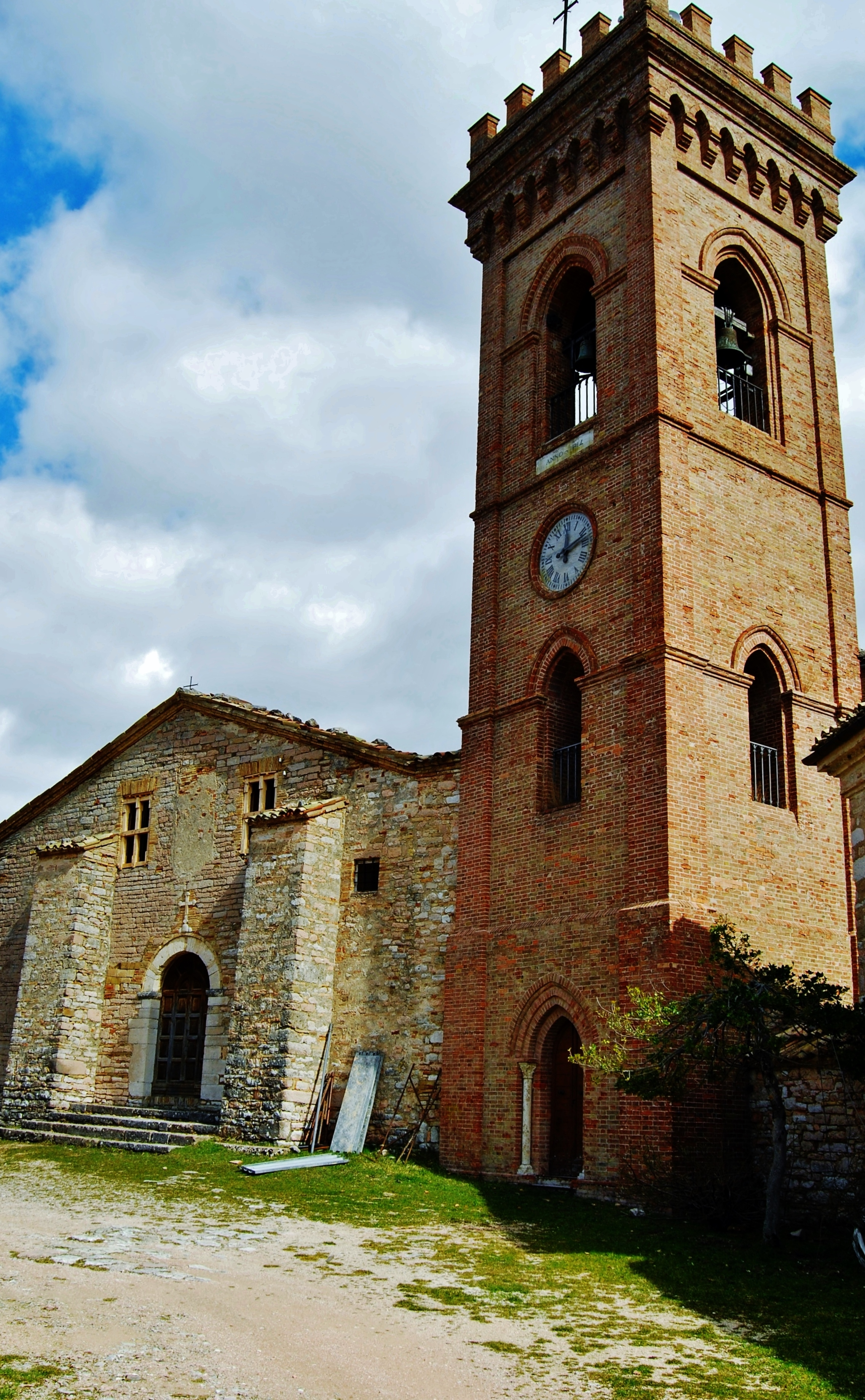
Church of San Paolo

Santa Paolo Apostolo is a Roman Catholic church located on Via Bartocci in the town of Fiastra, province of Macerata, in the region of Marche, Italy.

== History ==
A church is documented at the site since 1234. It was defined by a basilica layout with three naves, but it was refurbished over the centuries starting in the 18th century, in part due to earthquake damage. The present church mostly was designed in 1833. The three rounded apses of the earlier Romanesque church were converted into a single square space. The chapel of the Santissimo Sacramento has a rich stucco decoration, similar to the Bolognese church of Santa Maria delle Grazie. The main altarpiece of the church was once a Conversion of Paul the Apostle by Giovan Battista Gaulli. The painting is now sheltered in the palazzo comunale.

The belltower was rebuilt in 1914 at the site of a former watchtower of an adjacent castle.
