= The Woman Who Had No Shadow =

Scandinavian folk tale

"The Woman Who Had No Shadow" is a Scandinavian fairy tale, included by Sven Grundtvig in Gamle danske Minder i Folkemunde and Ella Ohlson in Sagor från Ångermanland.

It is Aarne-Thompson type 755, Sin and grace.

== Synopsis ==
A woman, wishing to have no children, threw rocks into a well at a witch's direction. Thereafter, she had no shadow. Her husband, the parson, demanded to know why and threw her out, saying that their slate roof would blossom with flowers before she was forgiven. One day, a beggar woman sought refuge there; she died in the night, the parson recognized her as his wife, and the housekeeper called him out to see how the roof had bloomed with flowers.

== Motifs ==
The legend of Tannhäuser features the same growth as evidence of miraculous forgiveness.

== Adaptations ==
=== Music ===
Die Frau ohne Schatten by Hugo von Hofmannsthal and Richard Strauss is loosely based on this tale.
