= Fiastra =

- Comune
- Comune di Fiastra
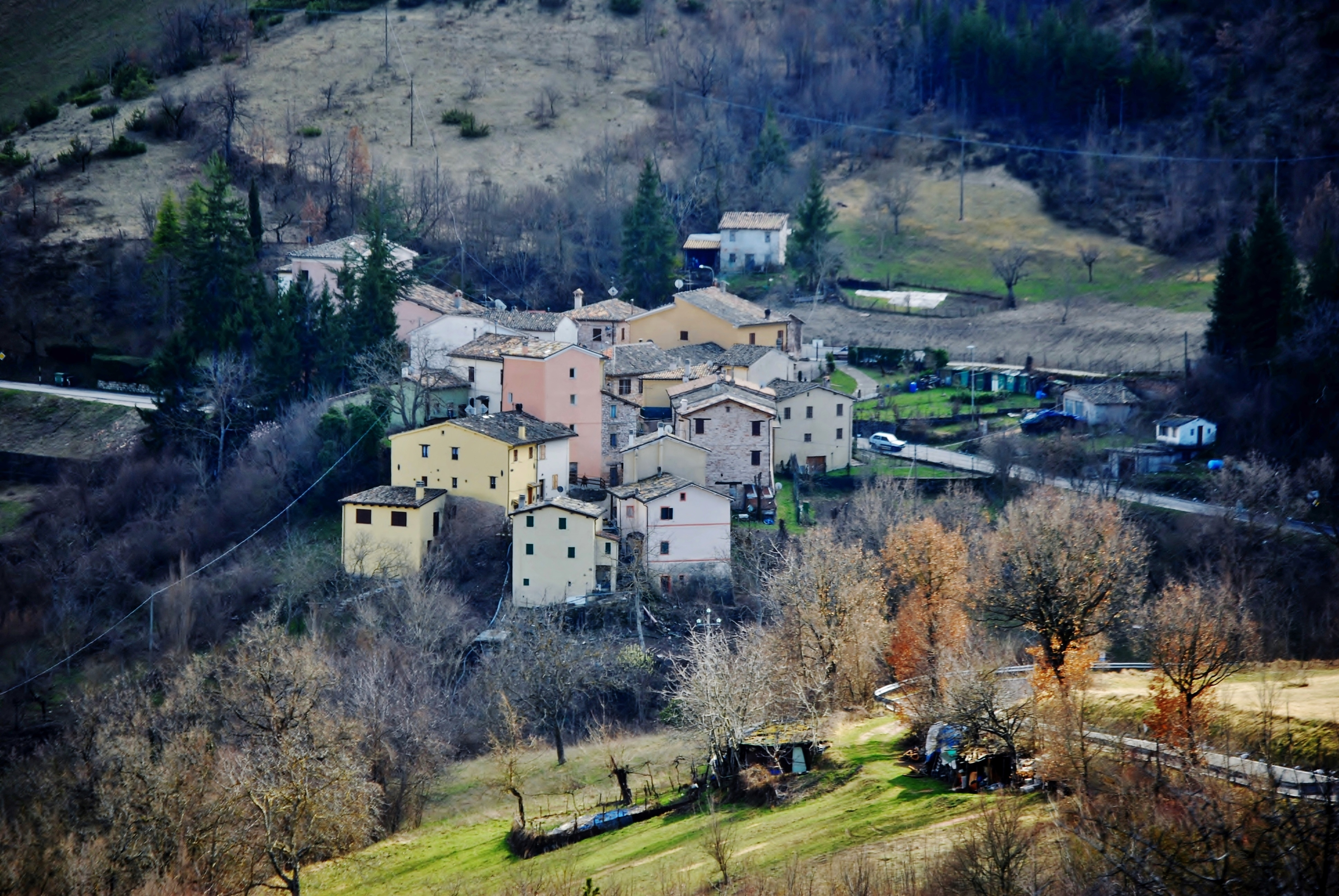

- Coat of arms

- Location within Italy Location within Marche
- Coordinates: 43°2′N 13°9′E
- Country: Italy
- Region: Marche
- Province: Macerata (MC)
- Frazioni: Acquacanina, Collesanto, Polverina, San Lorenzo al Lago, Cicconi, Fiegni, San Martino di Fiastra, Trebbio (communal seat)

Government
  - Mayor: Claudio Castelletti

Area
  - Total: 57.8 km^{2} (22.3 sq mi)
- Elevation: 732 m (2,402 ft)

Population (30 November 2016)
  - Total: 543
  - Density: 9.39/km^{2} (24.3/sq mi)
- Demonym: Fiastrani
- Time zone: UTC+1 (CET)
  - Summer (DST): UTC+2 (CEST)
- Postal code: 62033
- Dialing code: 0737
- Website: Official website

Fiastra is a comune (municipality) in the Province of Macerata in the Italian region Marche, located about 70 kilometres (43 mi) southwest of Ancona and about 40 kilometres (25 mi) southwest of Macerata.

Fiastra borders the following municipalities: Camerino, Cessapalombo, Fiordimonte, Pievebovigliana, San Ginesio, Sarnano. On 1 January 2017, it incorporated the former commune of Acquacanina.

Among the churches is that of San Paolo.

== See also ==
- Monti Sibillini
