= Monte Cardosa =

Mountain in Italy

- Location within Italy

Highest point
- Elevation: 1,818 m (5,965 ft)
- Prominence: 429 m (1,407 ft)
- Coordinates: 42°53′N 13°07′E

Geography
- Location: Marche, Italy
- Parent range: Apennines

Monte Cardosa is a mountain of Marche, Italy. It is conical in shape, 1818 metres tall, and lies within Monti Sibillini National Park.
