= Tannhäuser =

13th century German poet and singer

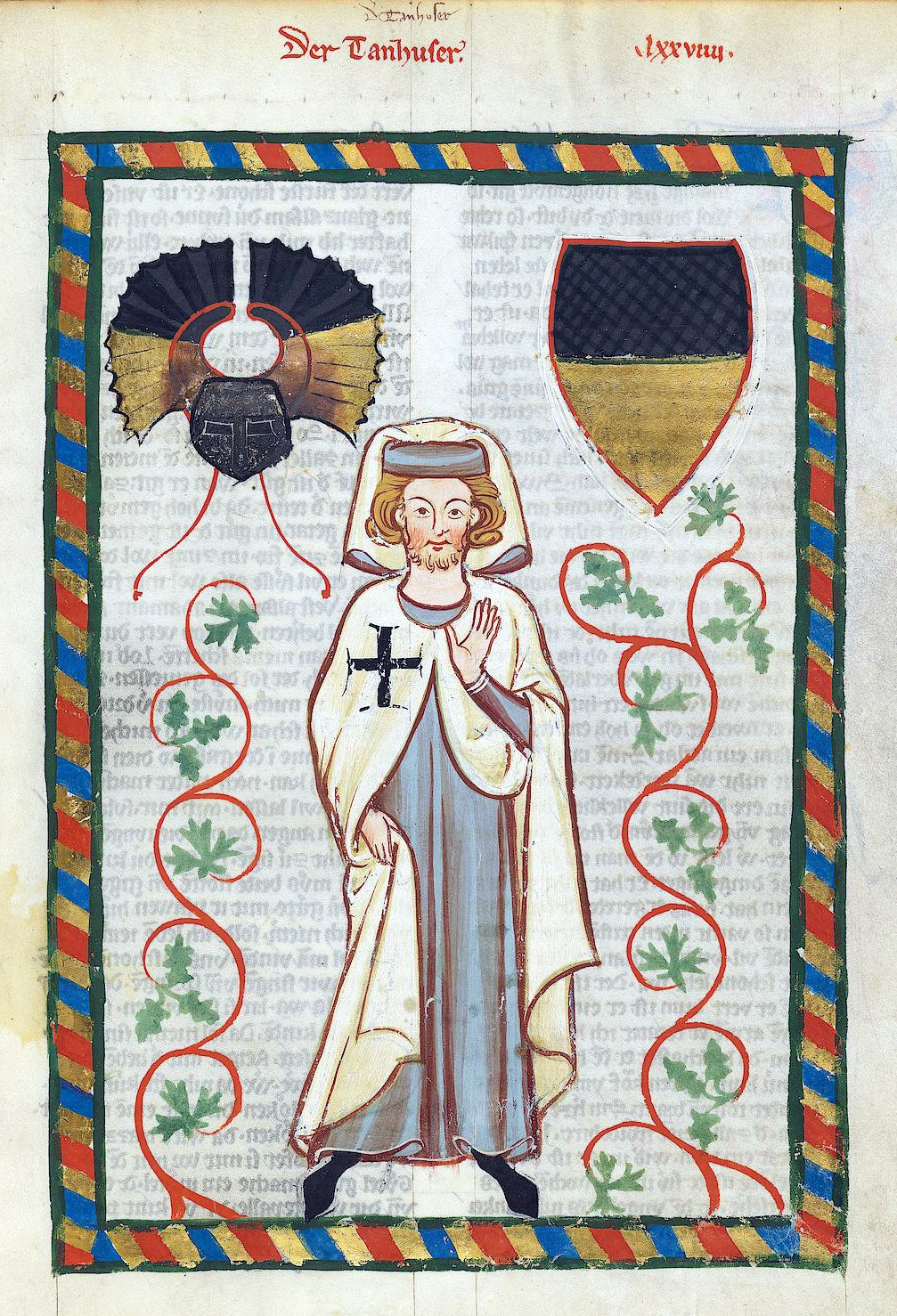
Tannhäuser, from the Codex Manesse (about 1300).

Tannhäuser (German: [ˈtanhɔʏzɐ]; Middle High German: Tanhûser), often stylized "The Tannhäuser", was a German Minnesinger and traveling poet. Historically, his biography, including the dates he lived, is obscure beyond the poetry, which suggests he lived between 1245 and 1265.

His name became associated with a "fairy queen"–type folk ballad in German folklore of the 16th century.

== Historical Tannhäuser ==
He is an ancestor of the von und zu Thannhausen Family.

The illustrated Codex Manesse manuscript (about 1300–1340) depicts him clad in the Teutonic Order habit, suggesting he might have fought in the Sixth Crusade led by Emperor Frederick II in 1228/29. For a while, Tannhäuser was an active courtier at the court of the Austrian duke Frederick the Warlike, who ruled from 1230 to 1246. Frederick was the last of the Babenberg dukes; upon his death in the Battle of the Leitha River, Tannhäuser left the Vienna court.

Tannhäuser was a proponent of the leich (lai) style of minnesang and dance-song poetry. As literature, his poems parody the traditional genre with irony and hyperbole, somewhat similar to later commercium songs. However, his Bußlied (Poem on Atonement) is unusual, given the eroticism of the remaining Codex Manesse.

== Tannhäuser legend ==
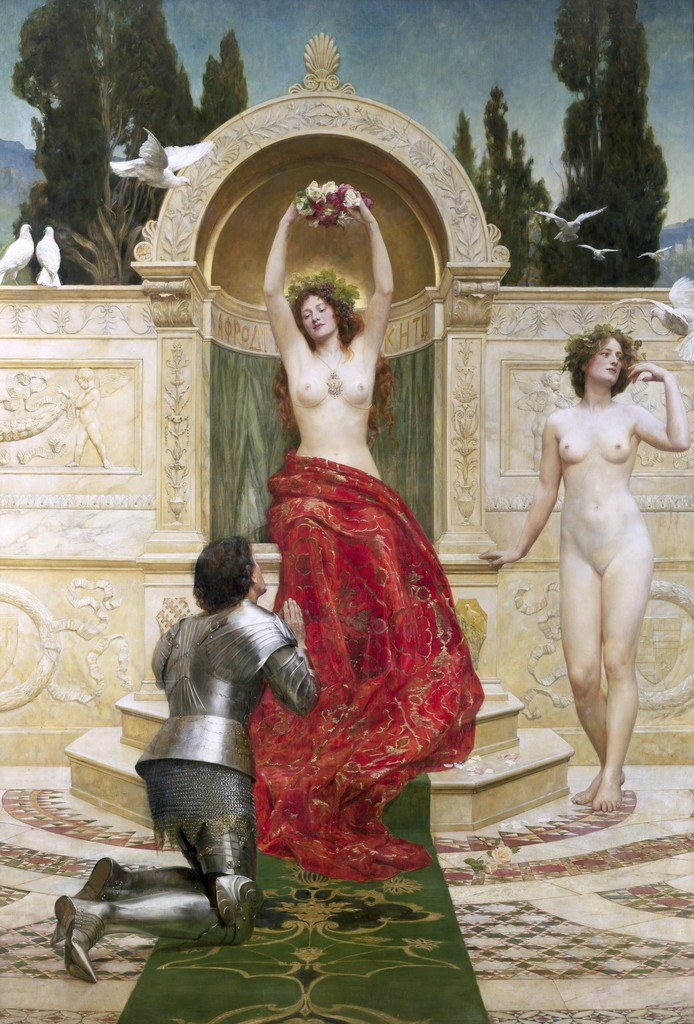
In the Venusberg by John Collier, 1901: a gilded setting that is distinctly Italian quattrocento.

Based on his Bußlied, Tannhäuser became the subject of a legendary account. It makes Tannhäuser a knight and poet who found the Venusberg, the subterranean home of Venus, and spent a year there worshipping the goddess. After leaving the Venusberg, Tannhäuser is filled with remorse, and travels to Rome to ask Pope Urban IV (reigned 1261–1264) if it is possible to be absolved of his sins. Urban replies that forgiveness is impossible, as much as it would be for his papal staff to blossom. Three days after Tannhäuser's departure, Urban's staff blooms with flowers; messengers are sent to retrieve the knight, but he has already returned to Venusberg, never to be seen again.

The earliest version of the narrative of the legend, not yet associated with the name of Tannhäuser, is first recorded by the Provençal writer Antoine de la Sale (c. 1440) in his book La Salade. Here he narrates his visit to the town of Montemonaco in the Sibillini Mountains, Italy, and reports on the local legend of a fairy court hidden in a cave on the local mountains. La Sale personally visited the cave but did not delve into it past the entrance. He also reports the legend of an unnamed German knight who would have descended in the cave and lived there as one of the fairies' spouse, before coming back to seek forgiveness from the Pope. Despairing of not being forgiven for his sins, he would have returned to the fairies' cave to live eternally among them.

The association of this narrative with the name of Tannhäuser appears to take place in the early 16th century. A German Tannhäuser folk ballad is recorded in numerous versions beginning around 1510.

The popularity of the ballad continued unabated well into the 17th century.

The motif became most popular as the principal source for Richard Wagner's large three-act opera Tannhäuser (1845), which changes a few story elements and is known for including a scandalous depiction of the revels of Venus's court in its first scene. The plot of the opera covers both the Tannhäuser legend and the epic of the Sängerkrieg at Wartburg Castle.

== See also ==
- Medieval German literature
- The Woman Who Had No Shadow

== Bibliography ==
- Garrett, Leah (2011). A Knight at the opera: Heine, Wagner, Herzl, Peretz, and the Legacy of der Tannhäuser. West Lafayette, Ind.: Purdue University Press. ISBN 9781557536013.
