= Lago di Pilato =

Lake in Marche, Italy

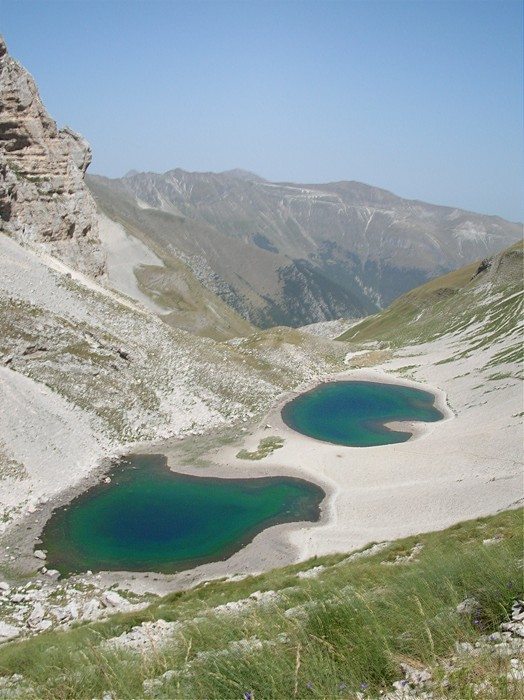
- Lago di Pilato during summer.

- Location within Marche
- Location: Montemonaco, Province of Ascoli Piceno, Marche
- Coordinates: 42°49′N 13°16′E
- Type: glacial
- Basin countries: Italy
- Max. length: 300 m (980 ft) c.a.
- Max. depth: 9 metres (30 ft)
- Surface elevation: 1,941 m (6,368 ft)

Lago di Pilato (Pilate lake) is a glacial lake located in Sibylline Mountains within the Apennine range of central Italy.

== Description ==
The lake is nestled in a narrow glacial valley beneath the peaks of Mount Vector (2476 m) and Cima del Redentore (Redeemer Peak 2448 m). It is believed to date back to the Upper pleistocene epoch, making it a significant geological feature in the region.

The lake takes its name from a local legend that claims Pontius Pilate was killed there and buried under lake bed as punishment for his role in the passion of the Christ.

Geographically, the lake is situated in the Marche region and holds the distinction of being the only natural lake in the area (excluding small coastal lakes). It is located in the province of Ascoli Piceno and is part of the Monti Sibillini National Park, a protected area known for its rich biodiversity and scenic beauty.

During periods of abundant water, the lake takes on the shape of a pair of eyeglasses, earning it the nickname "the lake with glasses". However, during times of drought, the water retreats into two smaller pools, altering its appearance dramatically.

== Endemisms ==
Chirocephalus marchesonii, a freshwater shrimp is endemic to this lake.
