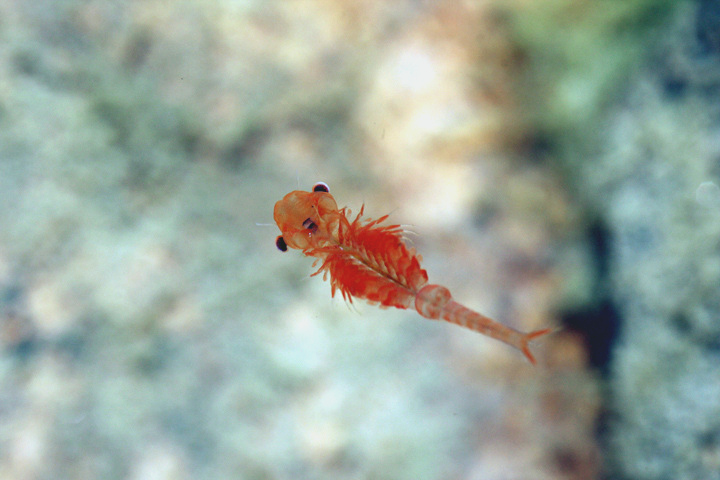

Scientific classification
- Domain: Eukaryota
- Kingdom: Animalia
- Phylum: Arthropoda
- Class: Branchiopoda
- Order: Anostraca
- Family: Chirocephalidae
- Genus: Chirocephalus
- Species: C. marchesonii

Binomial name
- Chirocephalus marchesonii Ruffo & Vesentini, 1957

= Chirocephalus marchesonii =

Species of small freshwater animal

Chirocephalus marchesonii is a species of fairy shrimp in the family Chirocephalidae. It is endemic to Pilate Lake.

== Discovery ==
Chirocephalus marchesonii was observed for the first time in 1954 by Vittorio Marchesoni, director of the Botanical Institute of the University of Camerino, during an excursion. New samples were studied in 1957 by Ruffo and Vesentini, who established that it was a new species of crustacean. Chirocephalus name is in tribute to his first discoverer Vittorio Marchesoni.

== Description ==
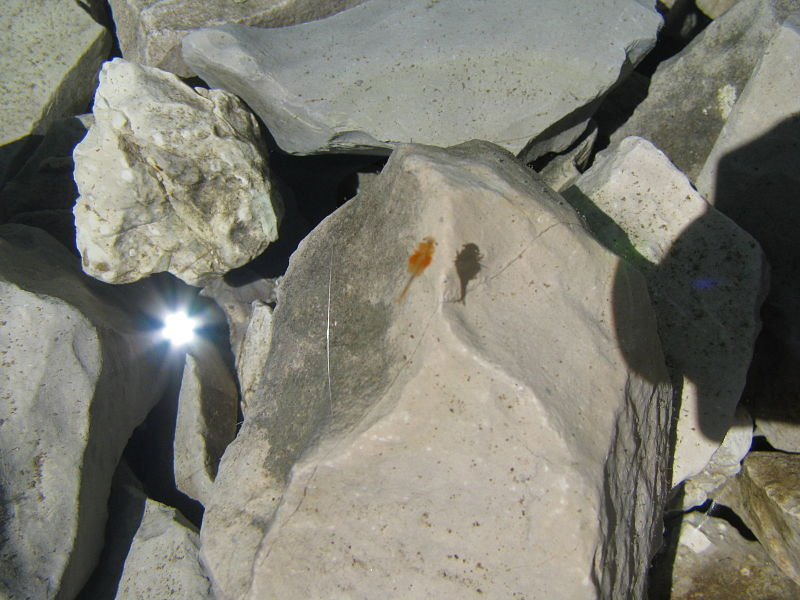

Chirocephalus marchesonii stands out easily from other branchiopods thanks to its long, approximately cylindrical body as well as its lack of a shell. Its body, which presents an obvious metamerism, is divided into three sections: head, thorax equipped with eleven pairs of appendices/fins which also have a breathing function, and abdomen which contains the reproductive organs: an egg sac in the female, and two penises of the same length in the male.

These crustaceans, whose distinctive feature is that they swim on their backs, form part of the zooplankton. They move by making swinging movements of the appendices along the rib cage. Their swimming position seems to derive from a positive phototropism.

The species has a characteristic coral red coloring. The size ranges for both sexes between 9 and 12 mm.

The eggs are spherical in shape and compared to other similar species found in Italy (C. kerkyrensis, C. salinus, C. sibyllae, C. diaphanous and C. ruffoi) are among the largest, with an average diameter of 0.43 mm.

Chirocephalus marchesonii has an anamorphic development, where the embryo opens as a Nauplius larva, only reaching adult shape after a series of gradual morphological modifications, while new sections and appendices are gradually added. Its biological cycle is synchronized and totally dependent on the annual hydrological cycle of Pilate Lake, generally between the beginning of June and the end of September.

== Habitat and behaviour ==
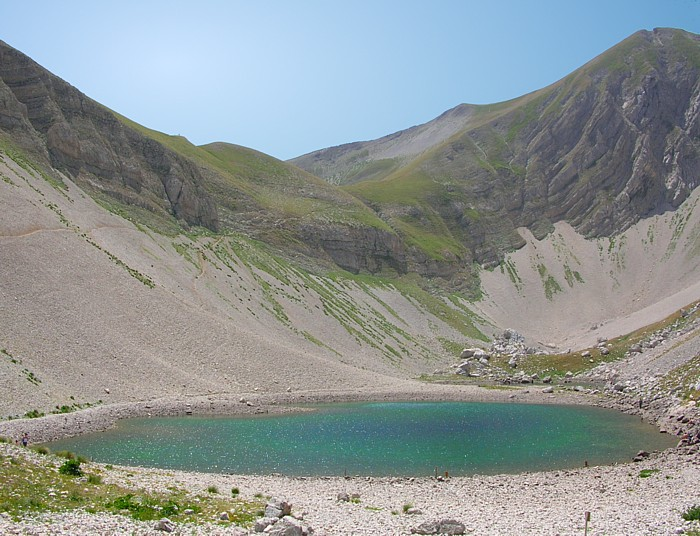
Pilate Lake

One of the principal characteristics of the anostraca consists in their adaptability to environments subjected to strong seasonal stress. The environment is often made of temporary water pockets and of little aquatic ponds characterized by a total temporary lack of water and going through extreme phases (draining/freezing) and (or) by fluctuations of the water level and as a result by strong wavering of the physic-chemical factors.

In order to face up these kinds of difficulties, the Chirocephalus produce a form of resistance called cyst, inside of which the embryo is stopped at the stage of gastrulation, is isolated by a protective partition which allows it to keep its vitality until the moment when the ideal conditions for its development recreate themselves until the hatching.

== Preservation ==
The cysts are left season after season and do not all hatch out, a part stays in the sediment which constitutes de facto a stock and an extra guarantee for the species survival. The protection of the biotope is primordial because the life of the species under its adult form only goes for several months, whereas the cysts which are produced stay vital for many years if the anthropic factors do not disrupt the sediments where they build up.

The most important risk is particularly related to the climatic changes in progress. The ecosystem of altitude such as the Pilate Lake one is characterized by specific climatic conditions which make it particularly vulnerable to high temperatures. The Pilate Lake is considered as a relic zone which, by its climatic and orographic conditions, constitutes a real refuge housing which keeps giving the necessary conditions to the survival of every species which populate it, among them Chirocephalus marchesonii, stenothermic species of low temperature.

If the forecasts of the Intergovernmental Panel on Climate Change reinforce, the species could disappear from now until a few decades.

== See also ==
- Monti Sibillini National Park
