= Santissimo Redentore e Santa Maria, Visso =

Church in Visso, Italy

Coordinates: 42°55′48″N 13°05′18″E

Santissimo Redentore e Santa Maria ("The Holiest Redeemer and St Mary") is a Romanesque-style, deconsecrated Roman Catholic church located in the town of Visso, province of Macerata, region of Marche, Italy. Typically, the Italian title is S.S. Redentore e S. Maria.

== History ==
The stone church was built in the 13th century. It has a single nave with three internal arches, somewhat acute, and adjoining square-based bell tower. The main altar was erected by the Confraternity of Santa Maria, which patronized the church. The interior were frescoed with a Madonna of the Rosary surrounded by the mysteries of the Rosary and a God the father with the Prophets Isaiah and Jeremiah. During a pastoral visit in 1712, the church was noted to be overburdened with seven lateral altars. The church underwent restoration in 1978 and after the 1997 earthquake.
