= Monte Lieto =

Mountain in Italy

- Location within Italy

Highest point
- Elevation: 1,944 m (6,378 ft)
- Prominence: 464 m (1,522 ft)
- Coordinates: 42°50′36″N 13°10′34″E

Geography
- Location: Marche, Italy
- Parent range: Apennines

Monte Lieto is a mountain of Marche, Italy.
