= Monte Bicco =

Mountain in Italy

Coordinates: 42°55′02″N 13°11′20″E

- Location within Italy

Highest point
- Prominence: 32 m (105 ft)

Geography
- Location: Marche, Italy
- Parent range: Apennines

Monte Bicco is a mountain of Marche, Italy. It is 2052 metres high.
