= Porche di Vallinfante =

Mountain in Italy

- Location within Italy

Highest point
- Elevation: 2,113 m (6,932 ft)
- Coordinates: 42°53′41″N 13°13′01″E

Geography
- Location: Marche, Italy

Porche di Vallinfante is a mountain of Marche, Italy.
