= Castelsantangelo sul Nera =

- Comune
- Comune di Castelsantangelo sul Nera
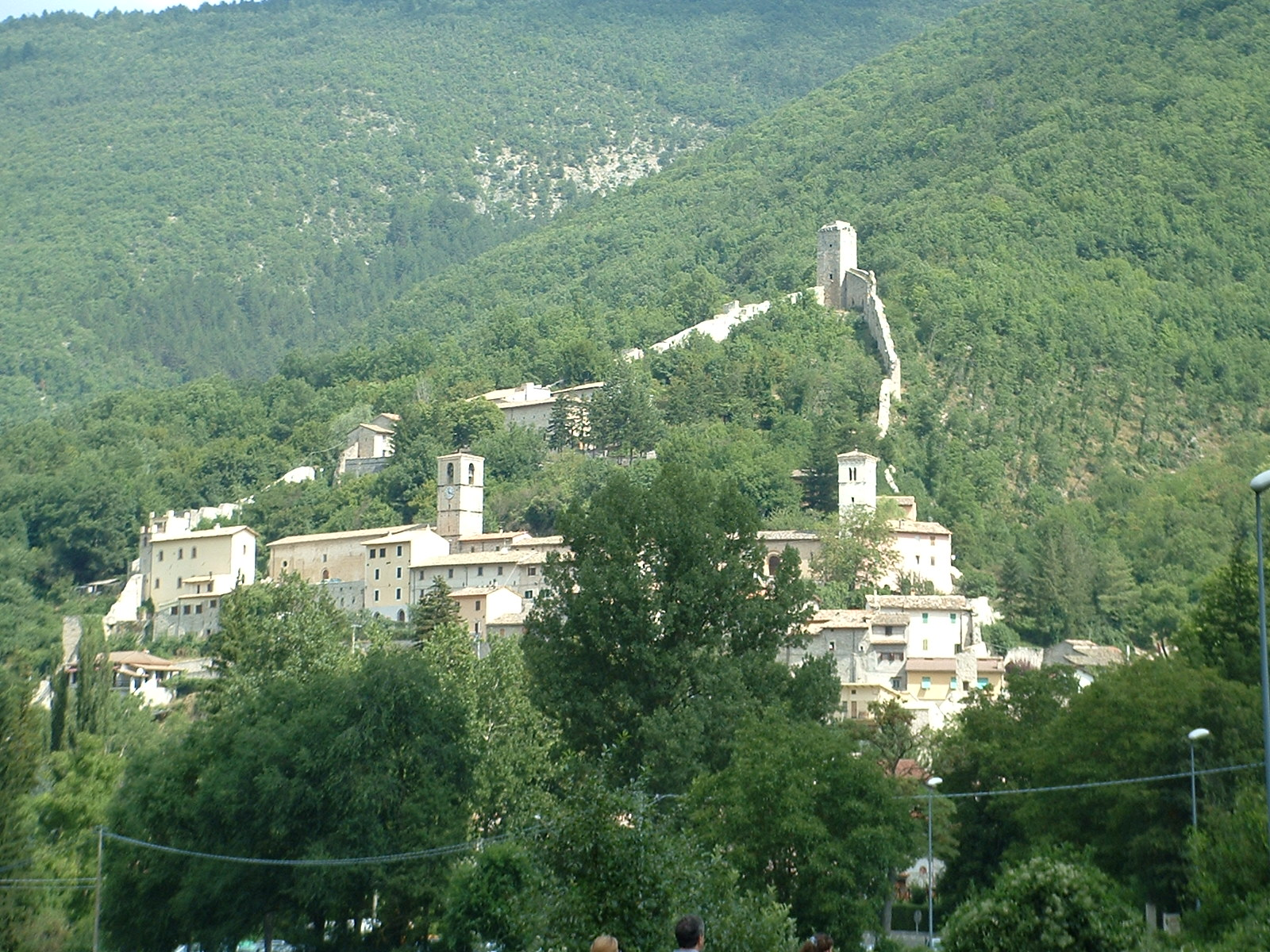

- Coat of arms

- Location within Italy Location within Marche
- Coordinates: 42°54′N 13°9′E
- Country: Italy
- Region: Marche
- Province: Macerata (MC)
- Frazioni: Gualdo, Macchie, Nocelleto, Nocria, Pian dell'Arco, Rapegna, Spina di Gualdo, Vallinfante

Government
  - Mayor: Mauro Falcucci

Area
  - Total: 71.2 km^{2} (27.5 sq mi)
- Elevation: 760 m (2,490 ft)

Population (31 December 2015)
  - Total: 281
  - Density: 3.95/km^{2} (10.2/sq mi)
- Demonym: Castellani
- Time zone: UTC+1 (CET)
  - Summer (DST): UTC+2 (CEST)
- Postal code: 62030
- Dialing code: 0737
- Patron saint: St. Stephen
- Saint day: 26 December

Castelsantangelo sul Nera is a comune (municipality) in the Province of Macerata in the Italian region of Marche, located about 90 kilometres (56 mi) southwest of Ancona and about 50 kilometres (31 mi) southwest of Macerata. The source of the Nera River is located in the communal territory.
