= Spina di Gualdo =

Mountain in Italy

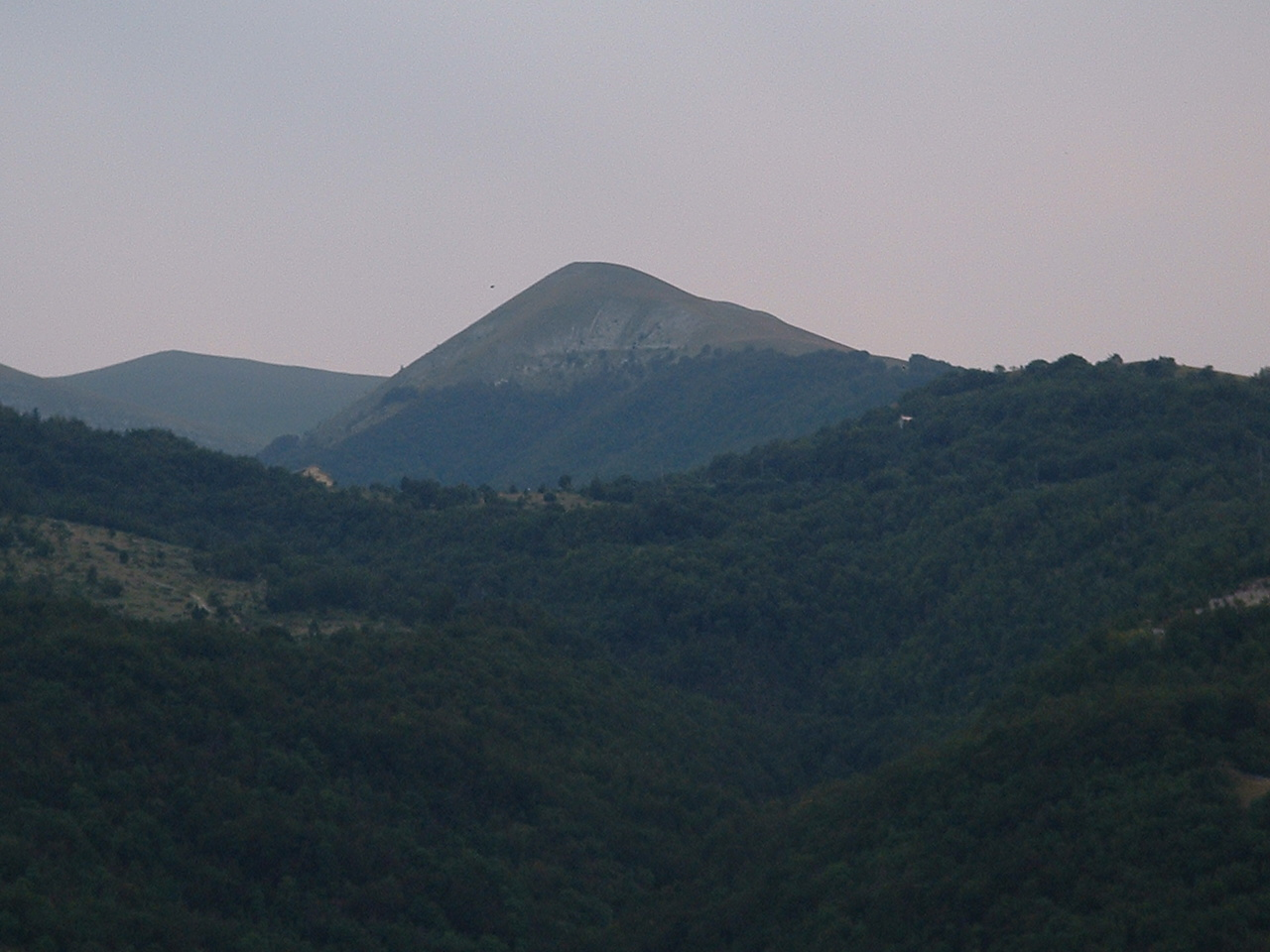
- Spina di Gualdo.

Highest point
- Elevation: 1,306 m (4,285 ft)
- Coordinates: 42°52′33″N 13°10′46″E

Geography
- Location within Italy
- Location: Marche, Italy

Spina di Gualdo is a mountain of Marche, Italy.
