= Sibillini Mountains =

Mountain in Italy

Coordinates: 42°49′26″N 13°16′32″E

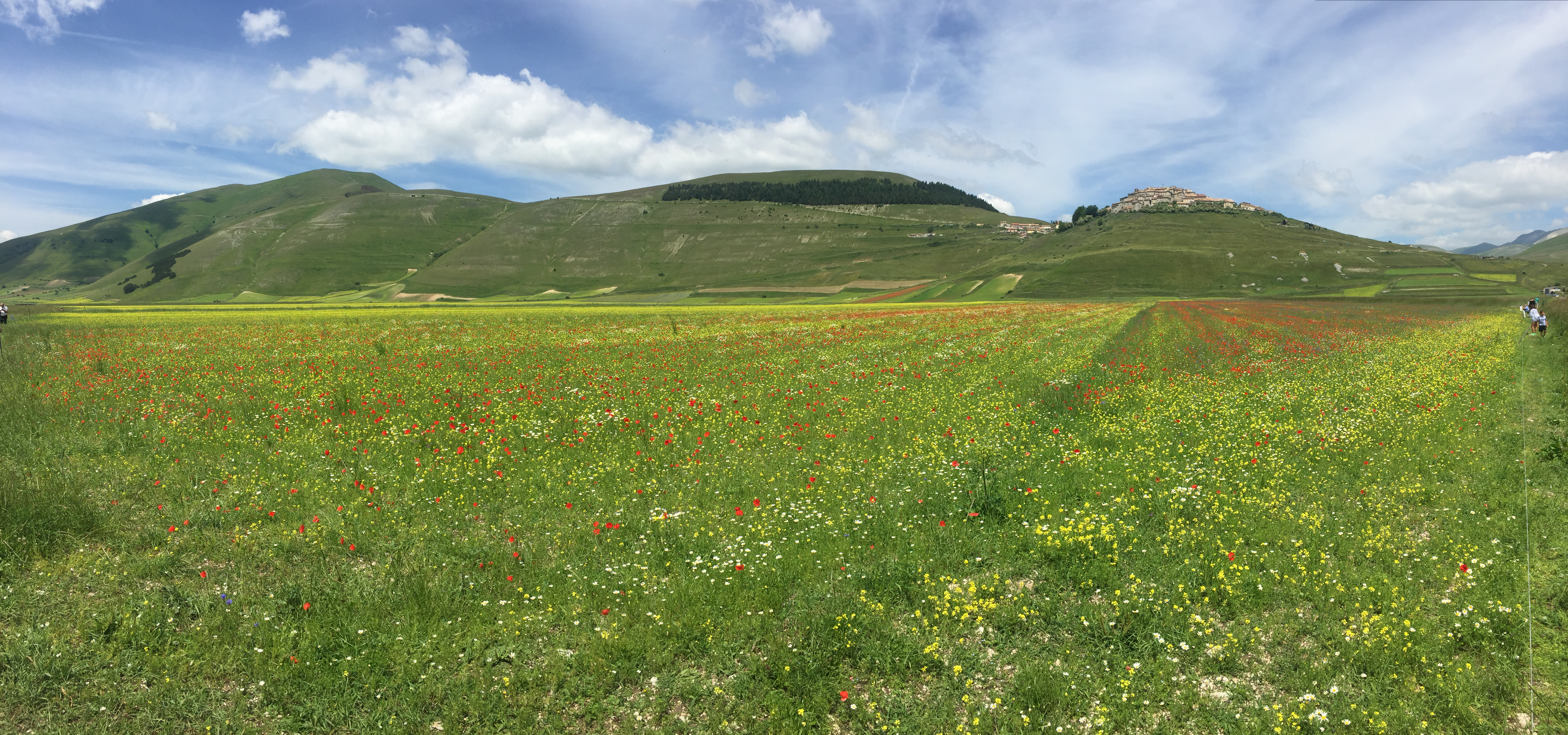
Lentil and poppy blooming on Piani di Castelluccio.

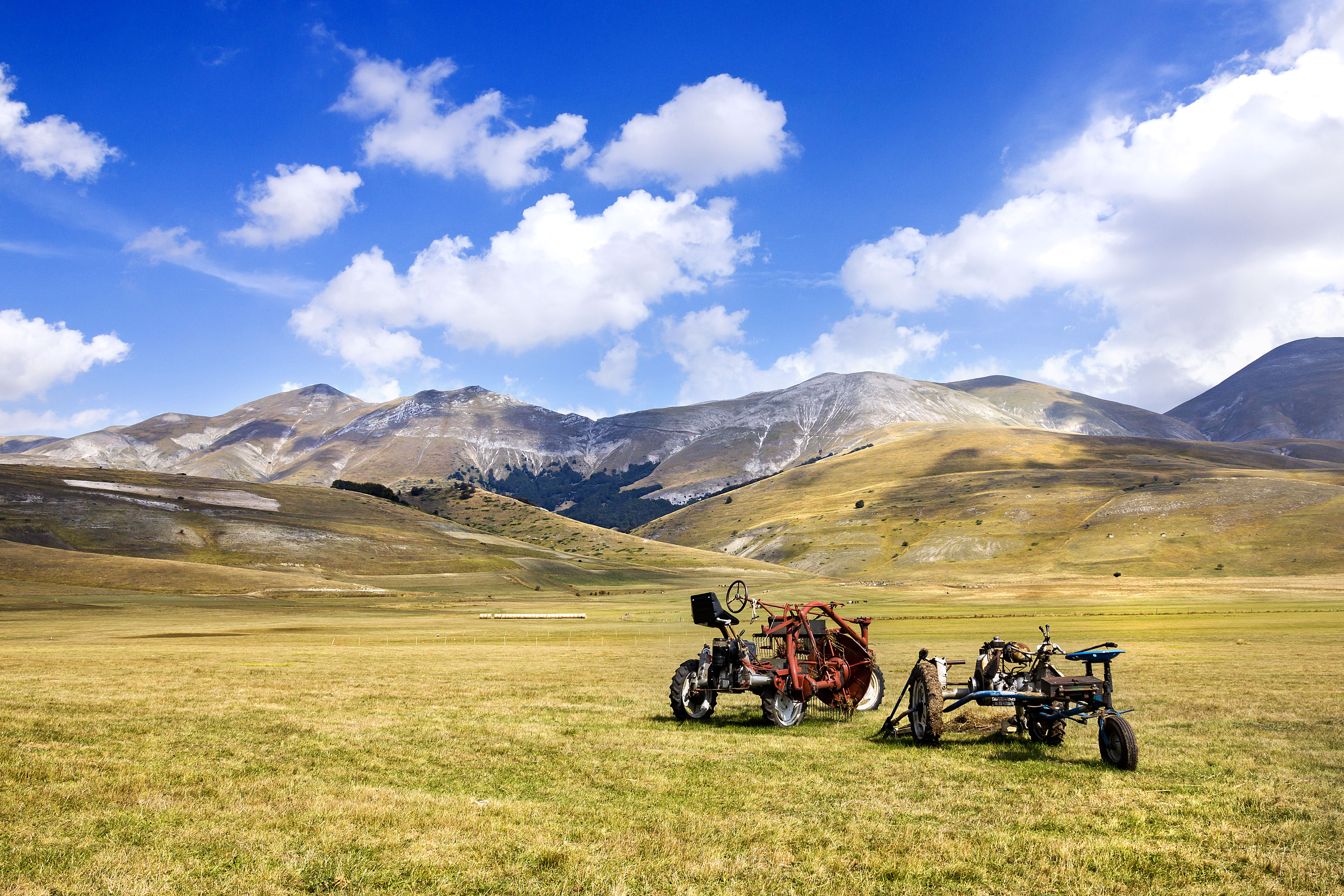
A summer view of the Monti Sibillini.

The Sibillini Mountains, or Sibylline Mountains (Italian: Monti Sibillini) are one of the major mountain groups in the Italian Peninsula, and part of the Apennines range. Most of the peaks are over 2,000 m (6,600 ft); the highest is Monte Vettore at 2,476 m (8,123 ft).

Since 1993 the area has been part of the Parco Nazionale dei Monti Sibillini (Sibillini Mountains National Park).

The present-day landscape morphology, predominantly U-shaped valleys and glacial depressions, is due to the action of glaciers during the Quaternary period.

== Wildlife and vegetation ==
- crested porcupine
- Eurasian eagle owl
- golden eagle
- peregrine falcon
- roe deer
- viper
- wildcat
- wolf

The small Lago di Pilato within a deep U-shaped valley below Monte Vettore, is home to a crustacean endemic to this location, Chirocephalus marchesonii.

The area contains stands of beech scattered amongst open subalpine grasslands and meadows maintained by the grazing of sheep.

== See also ==
- Apennines
- Geography of Italy
- Monte Ascensione

== Sources ==
- Gentili, Bernardino (April 2002). "Note di Geomorfologia del Parco Nazionale dei Monti Sibillini". Collana dei Quaderni scientifico-divulgativi del Parco Nazionale dei Monti Sibillini. Ancona: Aniballi Grafiche.
