= Monti Sibillini National Park =

Protected area in Italy

- IUCN category II (national park)
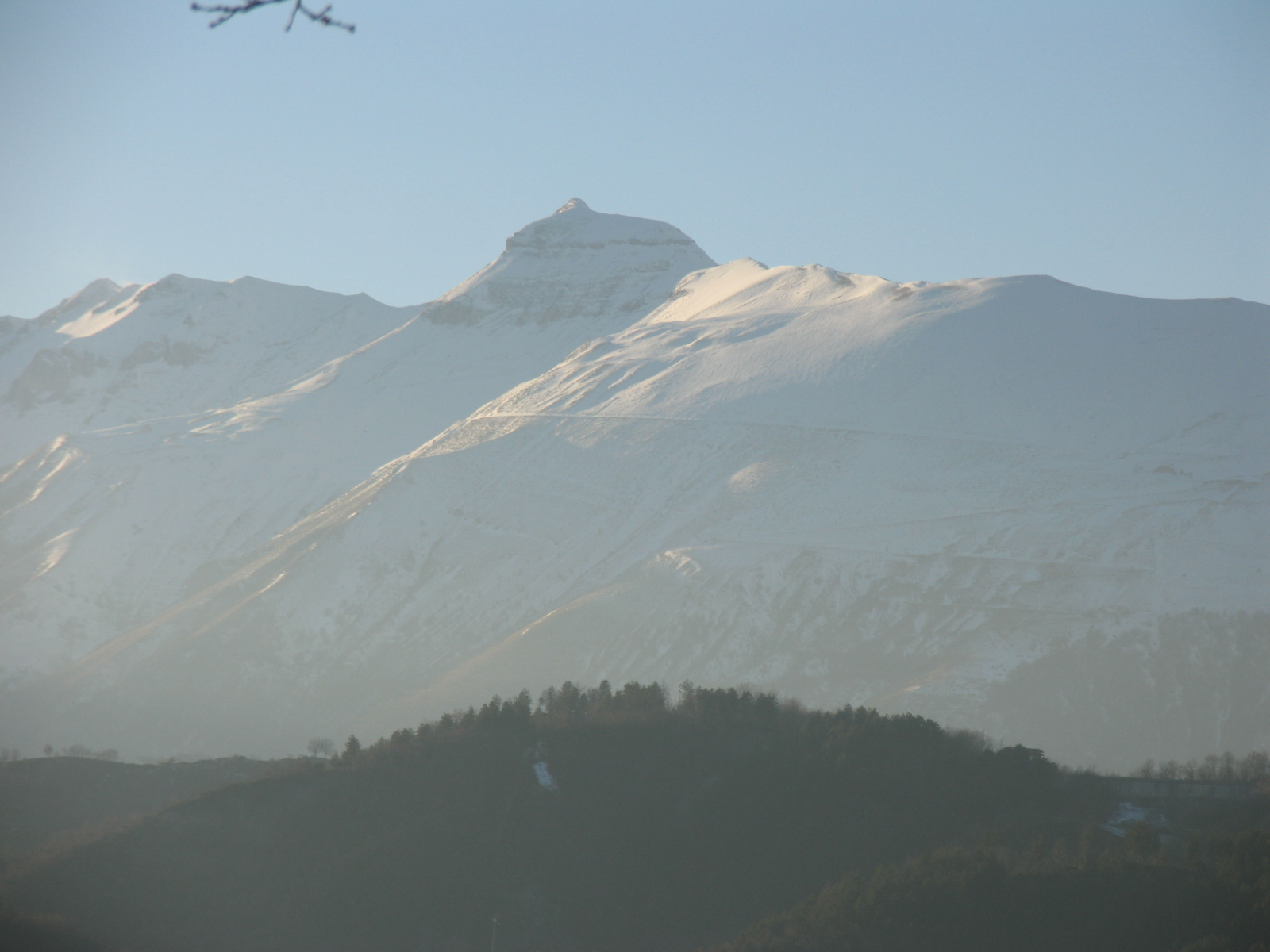
- A view of Monte Sibilla.

- Location within Italy
- Location: Marche, Umbria
- Nearest city: Visso
- Coordinates: 42°55′59.2062″N 13°4′44.9724″E
- Area: 697.22 km^{2} (269.20 sq mi)
- Established: 6 August 1993
- Governing body: Ente Parco Nazionale dei Monti Sibillini
- Website: www.sibillini.net

The Monti Sibillini National Park (Italian: Parco Nazionale dei Monti Sibillini) is an Italian national park located across the regions of Marche and Umbria, encompassing the provinces of Macerata, Fermo, Ascoli Piceno and Perugia.

It was established in 1993, and now contains more than 70,000 hectares.
