= Turchi (surname) =

Turchi is an Italian surname. Notable people with the surname include:

- Adeodato Turchi (1724–1803), Italian bishop and writer
- Alessandro Turchi (1578–1649), Italian Baroque painter
- Celina Turchi (born 1952), Brazilian epidemiologist
- Dolores Turchi (born 1935), Italian writer
- Egidio Turchi (1913–1954), Italian footballer
- Fabio Turchi (born 1993), Italian boxer
- Francesco Turchi (fl. 1500s), Italian scholar and Carmelite priest
- Giorgio Turchi (1931–2022), Italian footballer
- Giuseppe Turchi (painter, born 1759) (1759–1799), Italian painter
- Giuseppe Turchi (painter, born 1840), Italian painter
- Guido Turchi (1916–2010), Italian classical composer
- Manuel Turchi (born 1981), Italian footballer
