= Collegiate Church of Santa Maria Assunta (San Ginesio) =

Church in Marche, Italy

Coordinates: 43°06′31″N 13°19′09″E

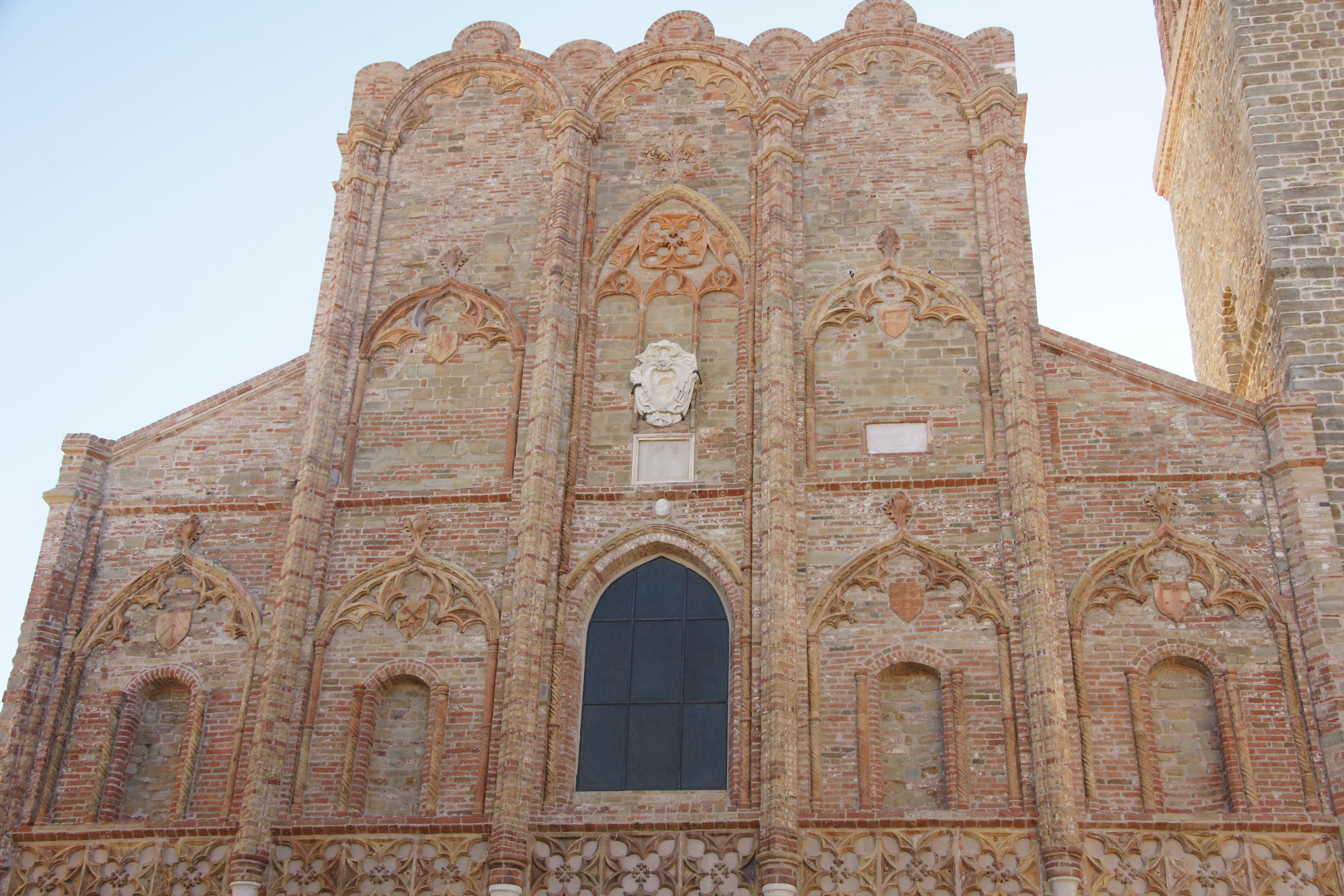
- Collegiate Church of Santa Maria Assunta
- Location: San Ginesio, Marche, Italy
- Address: Piazza Alberico Gentili
- Denomination: Catholic
- Website: www.sanginesioturismo.it/chiesa-colleggiata/

Architecture
- Style: Romanesque and Flamboyant Gothic
- Groundbreaking: 1098
- Completed: 11th century

Administration
- Archdiocese: Roman Catholic Archdiocese of Camerino-San Severino Marche

The Collegiate Church of Santa Maria Assunta, also known as the Pieve Collegiata, and renamed in the 19th century as the Collegiata della Santissima Annunziata (Collegiate Church of the Most Holy Annunciation), is a parish church and the primary place of worship for the Catholic community in San Ginesio, located in the Province of Macerata within the jurisdiction of the Archdiocese of Camerino-San Severino Marche. It belongs to the Vicariate of San Ginesio. This collegiate church stands at the heart of the historic center, on a square dedicated to Alberico Gentili.

== History ==
=== Evidence of the church’s foundation ===
The Collegiate Church of Santa Maria Assunta was constructed in the 11th century atop an earlier Paleochristian chapel dedicated to Genesius of Rome, the patron saint of San Ginesio, located at the town’s center. The earliest historical records of its construction come from the 16th-century canon Marinangelo Severini, documented in his book Historiae Ginesinae. Severini provides a brief historical overview, placing the church’s foundation between 1072 and 1097, before specifying 1098 as the precise starting year in a dedicated chapter. This date is corroborated by an inscription composed for a commemorative plaque, which states:

This most ancient collegiate temple, erected in the year 1098 of the Christian era with an already small number of canons present, and consecrated with holy chrism in the same year 1695, was fully restored and repainted in 1832 through the counsel and resources of the canons.
Perantiquum hoc collegiale templum quod erat erectum anno reparatae salutis MXCVIII adstante iam exiguo canonicorum numero quodque eodemmet succrescente sacro chrismate donatum erat anno MDCXCV canonicorum consilio et opibus restauratum ex integro et dealbatum denuo fuit anno MDCCCXXXII

Regarding its expansion, Severini notes that it was undertaken to accommodate the growing population and facilitate easier access, with the new structure named a Pieve (Latin: Ecclesia plebi congrua, meaning "church suitable for the people"), as recorded in this passage:

Subsequently, to further expand the town center, the consuls took care to erect a larger church, which they called a pieve, and its rector a pievano, so that by this name it might seem to meet the needs of the common people, who are more easily persuaded by gentle words than by threats or force. They also decided it would be a collegiate church.
Postea, ut magis indus [intus] oppidum augeretur ecclesiamque maiorem [consules] erigere procurarunt, quam nominavere plebem eiusque rectorem plebanum ut hoc nomine plebli [plebi] satisfacere videretur, que blandiloquo sermone potius quam minis aut viribus ad omnia peragenda facilius compellitur eamque collegiatam fore censuerunt

This account is echoed by Canon Giuseppe Salvi in the 19th century in his Memorie storiche di Sanginesio:

Lacking a main church capable of accommodating the large number of people gathering in the new castle from nearby villages, the two San Ginesio consuls [...] resolved to build a church in the midst of the settlement, which they named a Pieve.
Ecclesiam majorem erigere procurarunt, quam nominavere plebem ejusque rectorem plebanum [...] eamque Collegiatam fore censuerunt

=== The late Middle Ages: ecclesiastical life ===
==== Early economic bequests ====
Marinangelo Severini explains in his book that the church was initially overseen by a pievano named Paolo, alongside four canons, who encouraged many citizens to make testamentary bequests to support the ecclesiastical community. These funds were later used to enhance and beautify the church, a practice common since the early 12th century. Historian Rossano Cicconi notes a gloss alongside Severini’s original text, indicating the number "1116," which might suggest an approximate date (a conjecture) for the start of these bequests or merely an arithmetic subtraction. Cicconi highlights Severini’s challenging narrative style, which avoids a chronological recounting of 12th-century events, instead employing temporal leaps and digressions. Nevertheless, Severini cites an official date, December 1117, referencing a donation under Emperor Henry IV, though its reliability is questionable. More credible evidence comes from Abbot Telesforo Benigni in the 19th century, in his Appendice diplomatica, where he transcribes the earliest record of such practices—a receipt from December 1147. This document reveals that economic transactions were conducted with witnesses and notaries in front of the church in the main square (Latin: in castro Sancti Ginesii in trasanna ecclesie plebis prope ulmos, "in the castle of San Ginesio in the shadows of the parish church near the elms").

==== Structural modifications ====
The building underwent numerous modifications and restorations. The first, in 1294, was overseen by Angelo Bussi, who extended the structure and added three apses. In the 13th and 14th centuries, the church—yet to be designated a collegiate—was entirely rebuilt, and in 1348 its original volume was altered with the patronage of the Da Varano family. Further changes occurred in 1367 to the portico, in 1433 to the baptistery and side doors, and in 1589 to the chapels on the right side. The most significant intervention, however, was the embellishment of the upper facade, commissioned in 1421 to Enrico Alemanno. The original portal from the earlier church remains adjacent to the current one. After structural alterations in the 14th century, a 15th-century fire destroyed the building, prompting subsequent restoration. During this period, Enrico contributed various artworks, including paintings.

Though it served as the town’s principal church, it was originally built outside the city’s defensive perimeter, which in the 11th century was much smaller than today. Only in the 13th century, with the extension of the defensive line in the midst of the conflict between the Guelphs and the Ghibellines, did the church fall within the protected area. In 1248, under Cardinal Pietro Capocci’s directives, the municipal government aligned with the papacy, with territorial changes approved by the Rector of the March on September 7, 1250.

=== The 18th and 19th centuries ===
In the 18th century, the town experienced numerous earthquakes, subsiding only in 1799. Repairs to the church’s resulting damage were delayed until the following century, specifically in 1832, when it was fully plastered, and again in 1838. During the same century, a lightning strike damaged the bell tower, an event commemorated by an inscription in the sacristy, decorated by the local painter Raffaele Clementini.

In the mid-19th century, after the Virgin Mary in Domenico Malpiedi’s Ascension reportedly moved her eyes, a chapel was built to house the painting, and plans were made to refurbish the facade. The chapel was completed in 1873, while the facade project was assigned in 1853 to Giovanni Battista Carducci from Fermo, then active in Tolentino restoring the Basilica of Saint Nicholas of Tolentino. Carducci proposed a neo-gothic pediment atop Enrico Alemanno’s 15th-century work, blending contemporary trends with the existing style, and restoring the dilapidated connection to the adjacent defensive palace (now the town hall), which had needed reinforcement since 1848. However, these plans were never executed.

With the establishment of the Kingdom of Italy and the subsequent suppression of religious orders, the town hall was relocated to the Franciscan convent on Via Capocastello, seized from the order, and replaced in 1877 with the Giacomo Leopardi Municipal Theater. This shift severed the medieval structural link between the church and civic buildings, of which only a few stones remain, marking the separation of religious and political spheres. The original connection, a trasanna plebis—a loggia used by notaries—later became a porticoed market in 1367, spanning the church’s front and linking to the town hall.

=== The 20th and 21st centuries ===
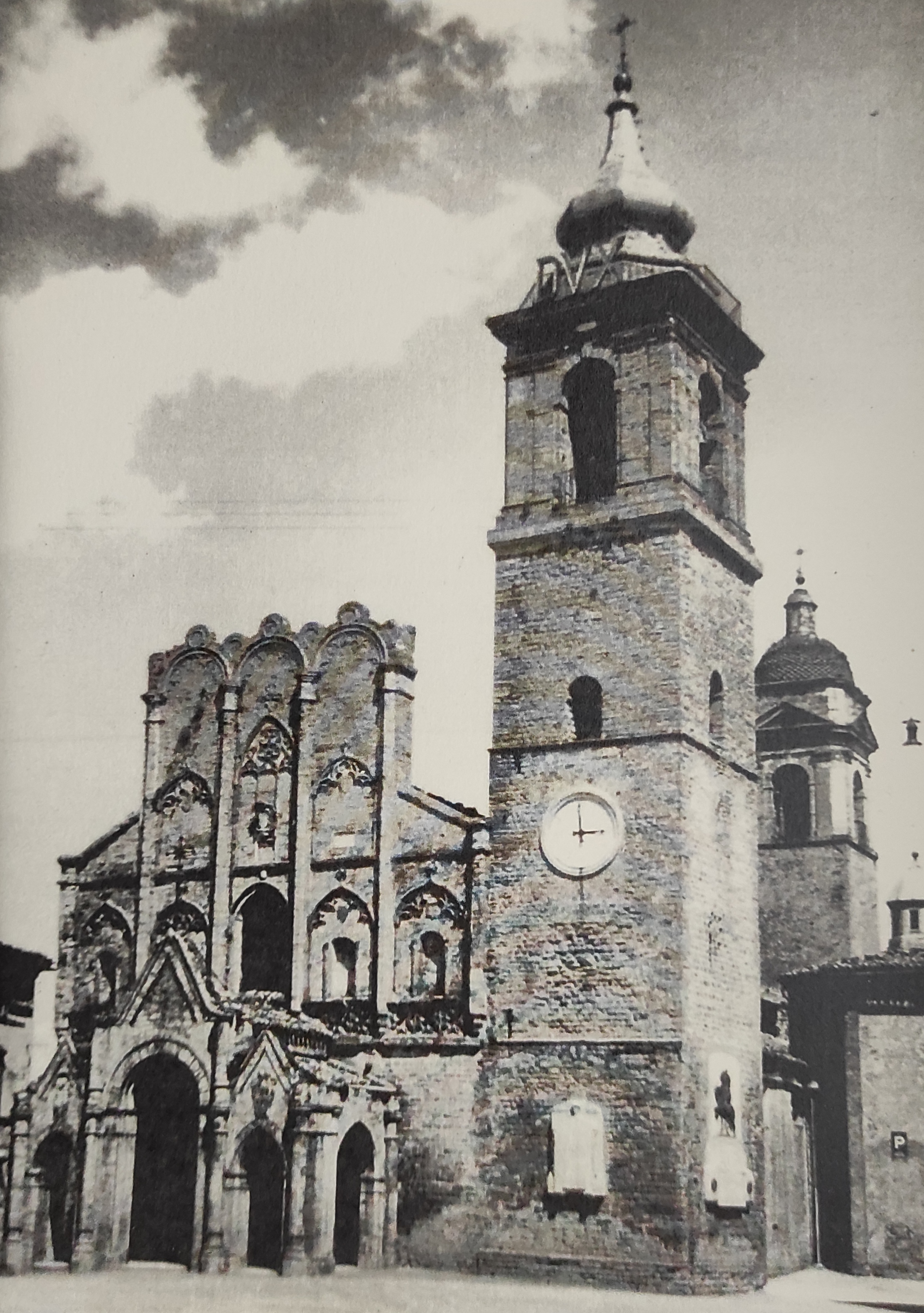
View of the collegiate church and the civic tower during the Fascist era

In 1905, the church was designated a "National Monument of Great Antiquity". In the early 20th century, the local Superintendency for Archaeological Heritage of Marche ordered the demolition of a porticoed loggia built in 1832. During the Fascist era, the portico remained intact. Its removal aimed to restore the facade’s original appearance, accompanied by the removal of Baroque altars from the left nave and the addition of an altar in the Paleochristian portal. From the mid-20th century, some 19th-century plaster was stripped, the deteriorating portal was restored, and in 1968 the bell tower was refurbished, reopening passages and removing an altar. On September 26, 1997, the 1997 Umbria and Marche earthquake damaged the bell tower, causing dislodgement of elements, followed by further harm from the 2016–2017 Central Italy earthquakes.

==== The 2016–2017 earthquake ====
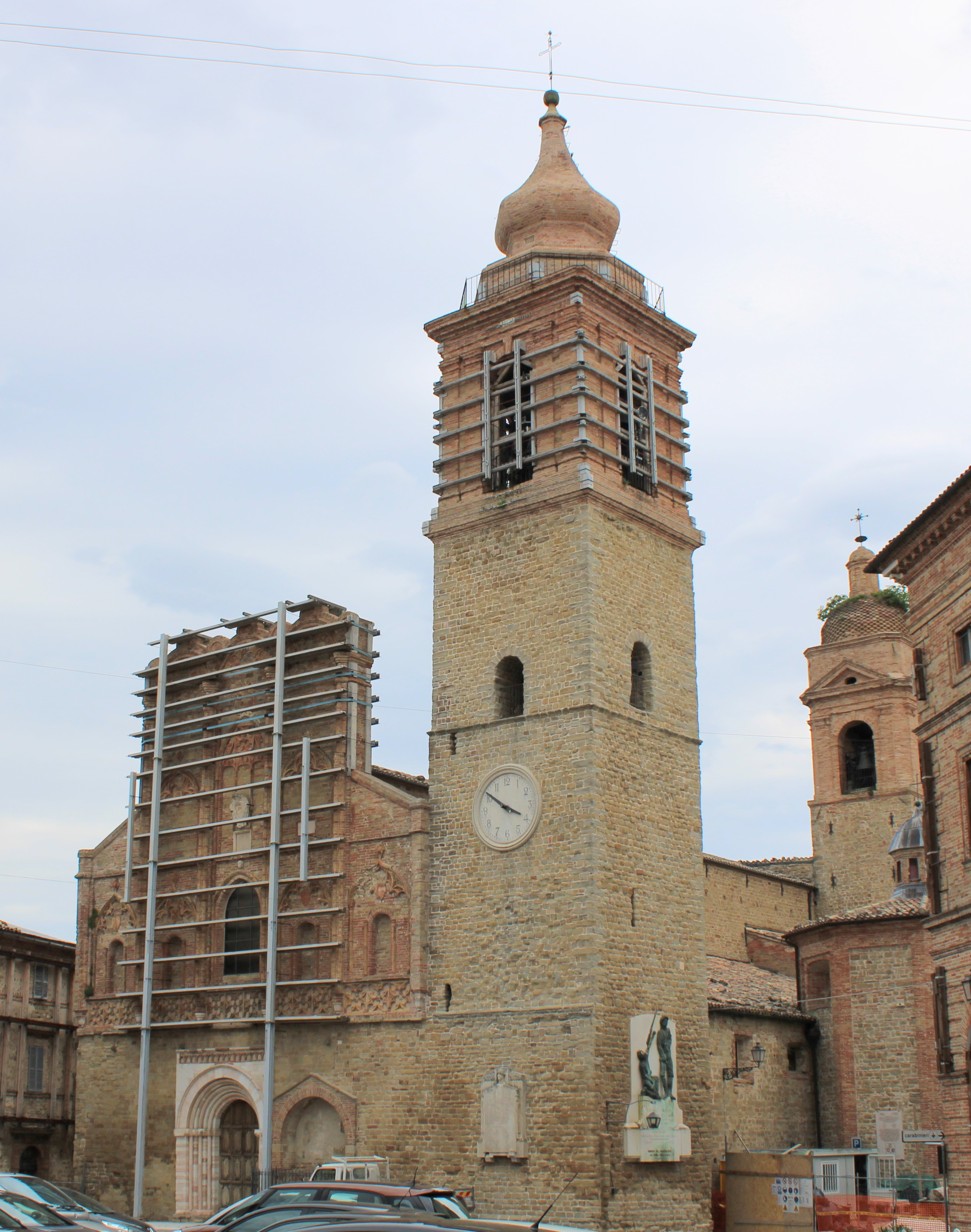
View of the collegiate church and the civic tower in 2020 after safety measures

The church sustained damage from the seismic events beginning August 24, 2016, particularly from the severe tremors of October 26 and 30. On September 8, 2017, it was included in the "First Plan of Interventions on Cultural and Artistic Heritage," approved by then-Commissioner for Reconstruction Vasco Errani a day before his term ended. The initial budget for repairing all religious structures in the Marche region was €84,100,000, later reduced to €59,250,000 under Paola De Micheli. On October 30, the municipal administration and technical staff conducted an inspection, identifying extensive damage, including:

- Complete fracture of the web above the main entrance;
- Localized collapse of internal ribbed vaults;
- Detachment of plaster and severe cracking in the vault masonry;
- Damage to the Madonna’s chapel.

The structure exhibits significant internal and external damage, largely due to its layout and size. The earthquake caused a partial ceiling and masonry collapse, totaling approximately 45 tons of debris. To prevent further harm to this monument—deemed "the most representative of the Ginesio territory" in a municipal technical report—the town engaged engineer Giordano Piancatelli to draft a safety plan, submitted on November 14, 2016, costing €250,000.

On February 8, 2017, the "MAR07" team from the Ministry of Culture assessed the building’s risk to public safety, noting in their technical report: "Collapse of the central nave vaults with precarious bricks. Penetrating cracks in the apse and bell tower. Severe cracks and a hole in the vault near the entrance of the Madonna della Misericordia chapel. Facade summit securing underway, with longitudinal arch bracing completed. Cracks in the Santissimo Crocifisso chapel, damaging the dome lantern (mechanism 14/15), post-1997 quake chain system in the bell tower, and perimeter steel profile. Significant cracks also in the chapel right of the altar. Recommended securing of the bell chamber (cracked arches) and lantern supports in the Santissimo Crocifisso chapel."

Safety measures involved polyester strapping and a double steel bracing frame integrated with the existing structure. Due to its unsafe condition, on November 18, 2017, the fire brigade salvaged all artworks under the Superintendency’s guidance. A 2018 decree from the Ministry of Cultural Heritage appointed architect Pierluigi Salvati as the sole overseer of reconstruction, budgeted at €3,200,000.

In 2019, the Collegiate, alongside the Basilica of San Benedetto in Norcia and the Church of San Giorgio in Accumoli, was classified as a "symbolic" religious site, warranting special restoration efforts. On December 28, 2023, a Conference of Services updated the intervention cost to €7,380,000, aimed at consolidating masonry, restoring artworks, and repairing damage, with specific focus on vaults, facade, floors, roofing, and frescoes.

== Architecture ==
=== Facade ===
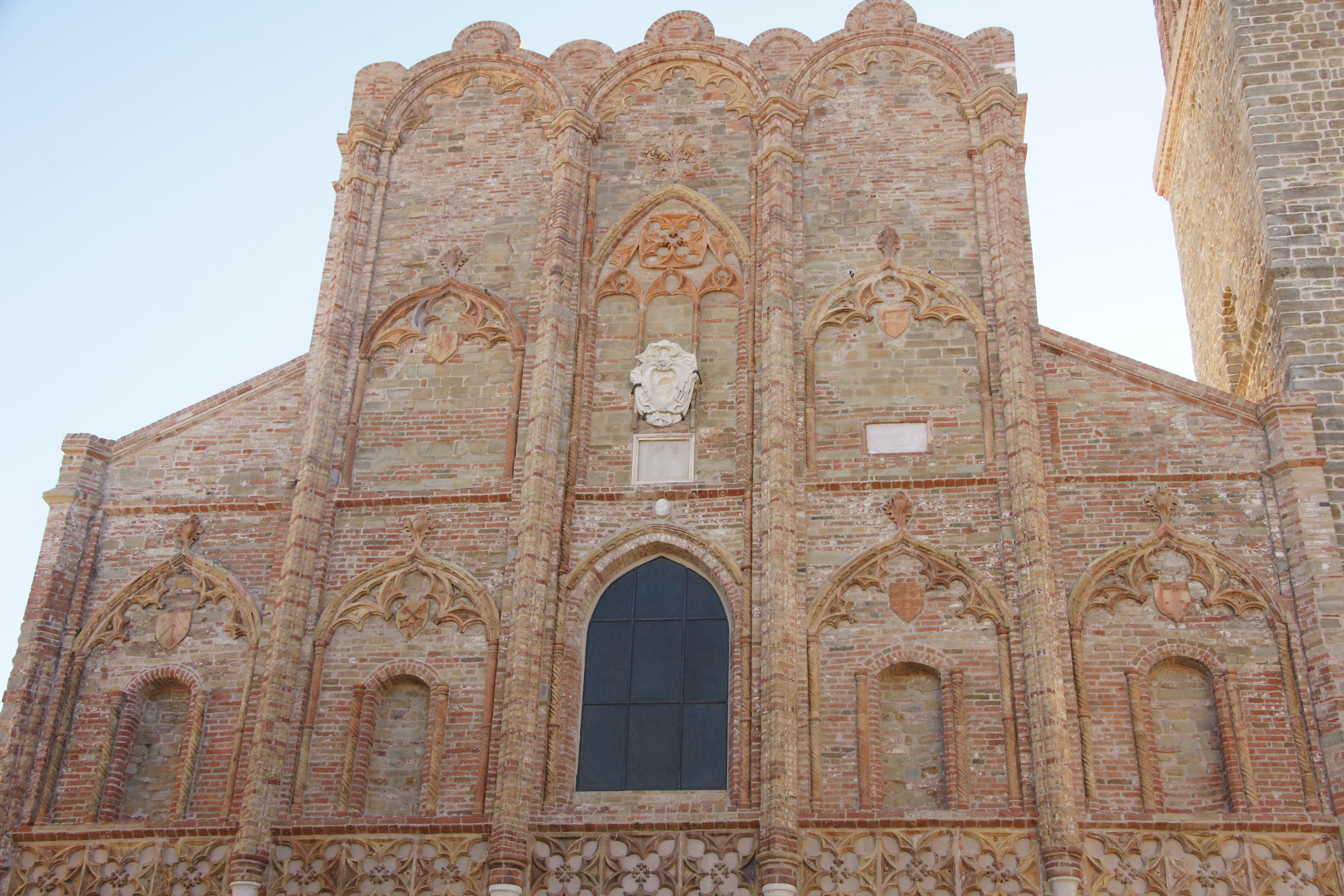
Upper part of the facade, showcasing the Flamboyant Gothic style

Traces of the original chapel remain in the aedicule to the right of the portal, believed to have once depicted the saint. The facade comprises three levels: a simpler lower Romanesque section and more elaborate upper Gothic tiers. Crafted in terracotta by Enrico Alemanno in 1421, it is divided into five equal-width but varying-height sections, representing the only example of Flamboyant Gothic in the Marche. Its stylistic elements appear contradictory individually but harmonious as a whole. The entrance portal, framed by a round arch, features a bas-relief of Saint Genesius holding an actor’s mask, while its sides bear ancient carvings of travelers’ names, dates, and natural events, such as one from April 5, 1595, reading: "A dì 5 de Aprile 1595. Neve et strina alta dui piedi per tutta la Marca" ("On April 5, 1595, snow and frost two feet high across the March"). Adjacent to the church stands the Romanesque civic tower, topped with a 17th-century bulbous roof. Near the door, stone etchings mark heavy snowfalls from the 16th century onward, alongside signatures of passersby.

=== Civic tower ===
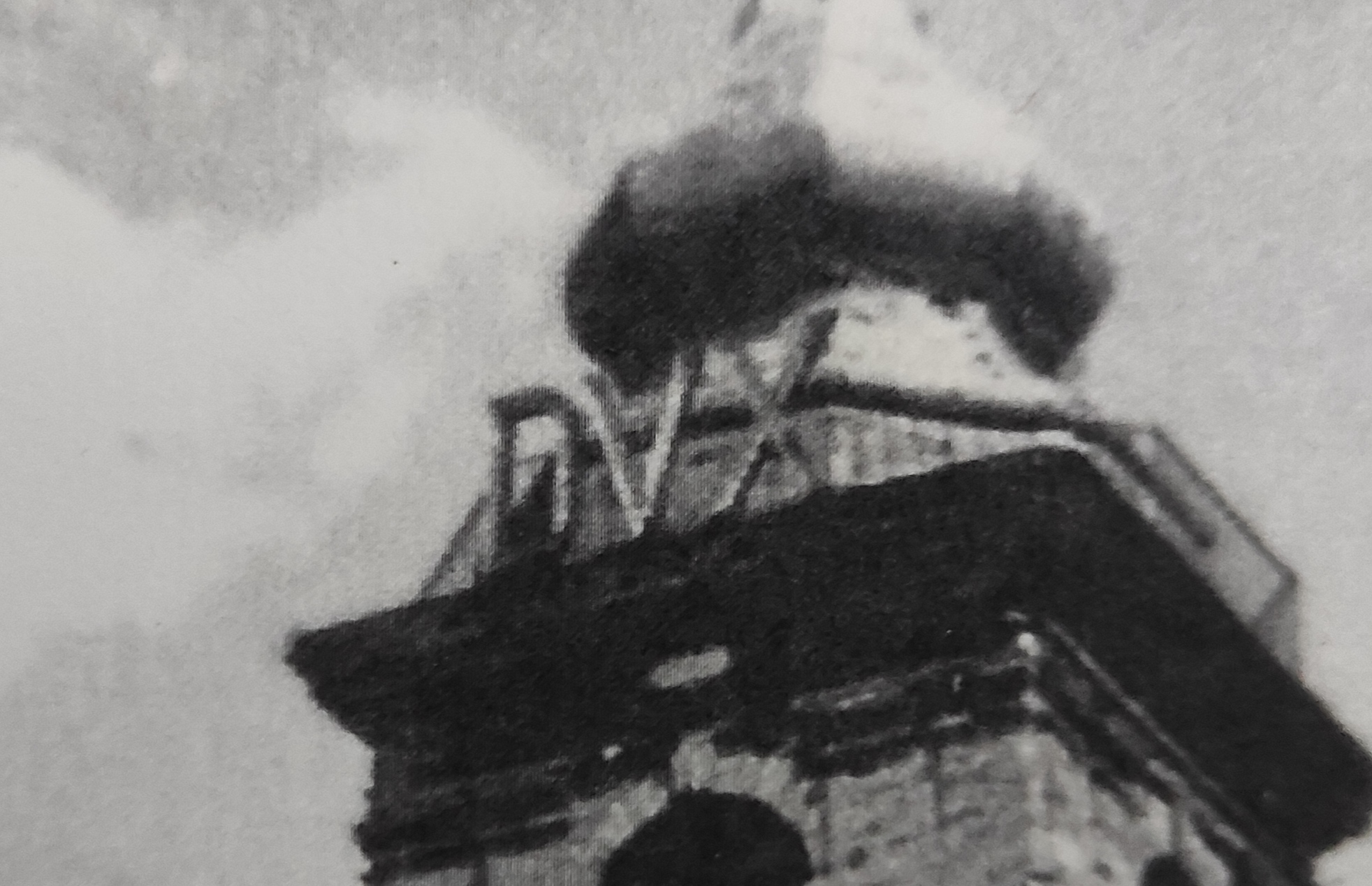
Detail of the civic tower during the Fascist era, with "DVX" on the 1899 onion dome

Structurally linked to the Collegiate but not part of its ecclesiastical property, the civic tower was built in Romanesque style, with its bulbous roof added in 1899, as noted on an embedded plaque. Municipally owned, it houses the "Empire Bell," a bronze bell designed by Guglielmo Ciarlantini, cast by the Pasqualini foundry in Fermo in 1937, and signed by Benito Mussolini. It commemorates Italy’s colonial success in Ethiopia (Italian Ethiopia) in 1935–1936. The tower also features two commemorative plaques: the Plaque in Honor of the Fallen of the Great War (1921) and the Plaque to Raffaele Merelli and Giovanni Cucchiari (1926). Damaged by the 1997 Umbria and Marche earthquake, it underwent safety measures following the 2016–2017 Central Italy earthquake swarm, with its upper section still secured.

=== Interior ===
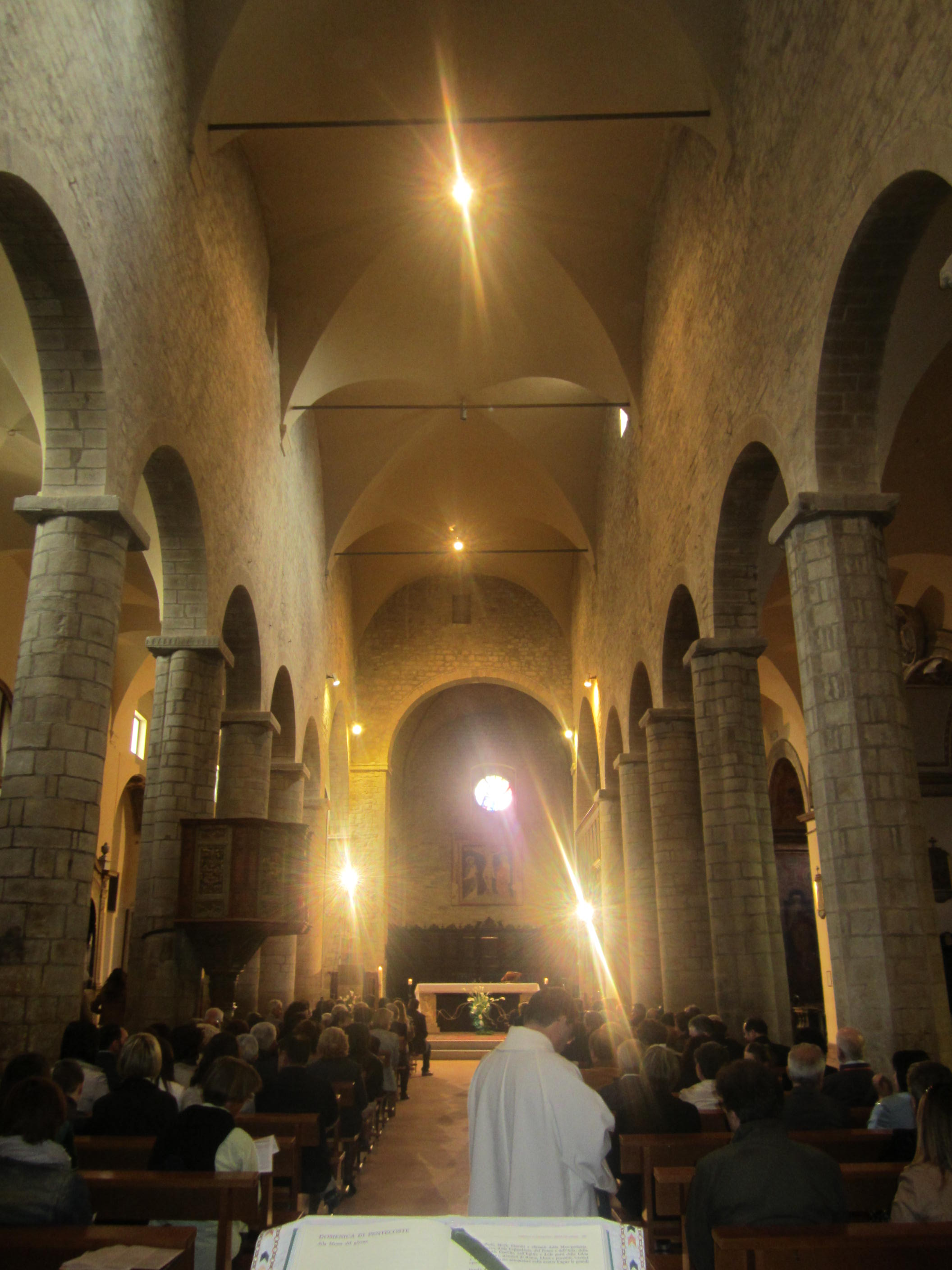
The church interior during a celebration

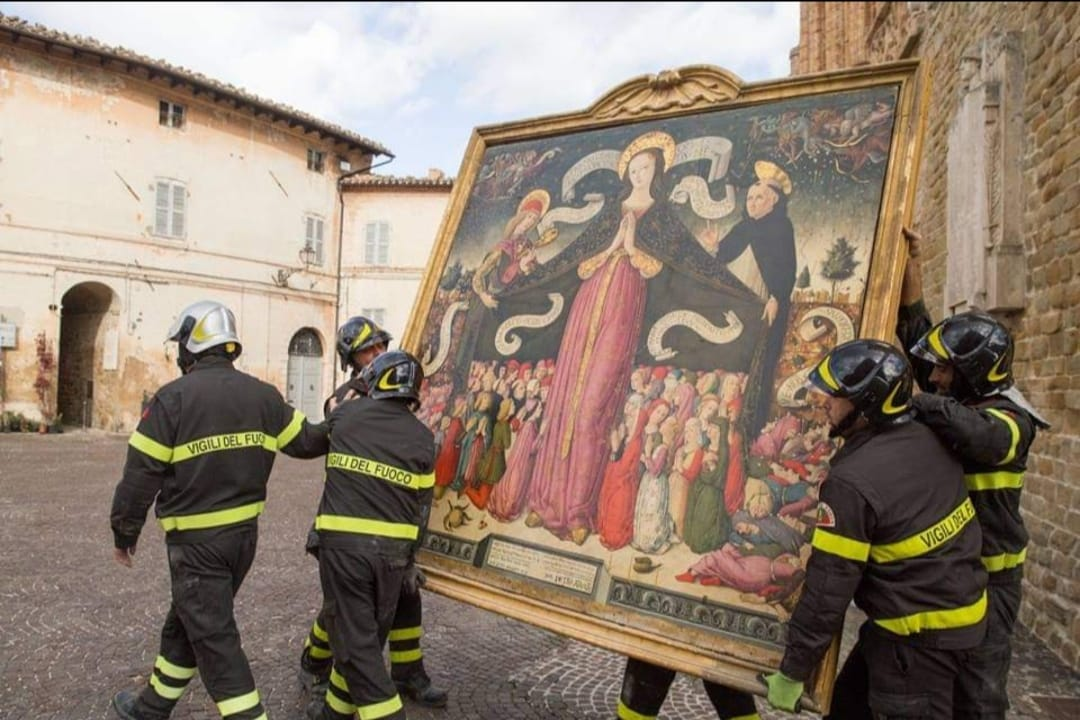
Firefighters rescuing Pietro Alemanno’s Madonna della Misericordia (1485)

The interior, divided into three naves by cylindrical pillars supporting round arches, follows a basilica plan with a flat apse and simple ribbed vault roofing. The side naves provide access to six chapels on the right and three on the left.

The presbytery houses an 18th-century wooden choir by Giuseppe Amaliani from Ripatransone. The side walls feature two significant works: the Madonna del Popolo by Pietro Alemanno, commissioned in 1485 to protect the community from the Black Death, and the Madonna del Rosario e Santi by Simone de Magistris from 1575, blending Roman Mannerist and Counter-Reformation influences with Lorenzo Lotto’s style from Cingoli. Beneath the apse lies the crypt, also known as the Oratory of San Biagio, divided into three vaulted sections. Its interior is adorned with frescoes depicting the life of Saint Blaise.

The main altar holds a 17th-century iron chest containing relics of Saint Genesius of Rome and Pope Eleutherius, donated by Pope Clement VIII to commemorate a notable procession during the Jubilee of 1600 in Rome. To celebrate this, the Collegiate Chapter commissioned two paintings by Domenico Malpiedi, the Baptism of Saint Genesius and the Baptism of Saint Eleutherius, copies of works originally in the Church of Santa Susanna in Rome. Once positioned opposite each other, they now flank the entrance. The relics are stored in silver containers.

According to local professor Giovanni Cardarelli (1942–2015), the Collegiate is not the only building in San Ginesio bearing Knights Templar symbols. In his publication Il mistero dei Templari a San Ginesio, he identifies Templar motifs—natural elements like flowers, animals, crosses, and objects—in the central nave’s capitals.

==== Chapels ====
- The first right chapel, of San Giuseppe, was commissioned in 1589 by the Confraternity of the Blessed Sacrament to house the Crucifix of the Exiles, now in its namesake chapel. A significant impulse came in 1591 from nobleman Alessandro Vannarelli, who funded its decoration by Simone de Magistris in painting and sculpture from 1592. At the altar, alongside the Crucifix, was De Magistris’s 1598 Crucifixion, now on the left nave wall. Dedicated to Saint Joseph in 1728, the chapel saw De Magistris’s works moved to the Crucifix chapel, leaving their frames and a damaged vault with three frescoes amid stucco. Now under the Matteucci family’s patronage, whose crest adorns the altar, it houses three works by local artist Mercurio Rusiolo from the family’s prior chapel, fitted into De Magistris’s frames: the Transit of St. Joseph, the Battle of Lepanto (1609)—commemorating a family member’s participation in the battle—and the Decollation of Saint Catherine of Alexandria (1609).
- The second chapel, of the Souls in Purgatory, was commissioned by Cornelio Severini, a prominent local figure, and named for its altarpiece. Flanking it are two works by Domenico Malpiedi, the Resurrection and the Pentecost.
- The third chapel, of the Crucifix, built between 1728 and 1744, was designed to house the Crucifix of the Exiles, a Venetian crucifix brought by 300 San Ginesio exiles from Siena as a peace offering. Its octagonal layout resulted from an agreement between the Confraternity of the Sacrament, the Chapter, and the Matteucci family, linking it to the San Giuseppe chapel. The vestibule features two 1598 works by Simone de Magistris: the Last Supper, notable for its asymmetrical composition, vivid colors against a black background, and realistic details like a kitchen still life, and the Ascent to Calvary. The tympanum was adorned with angels and symbols of the Passion of Jesus in Liberty style using encaustic technique by local artist Guglielmo Ciarlantini around 1911.
- The fourth chapel, of the Madonna of Loreto, was erected by Eritrea Scaramuccia’s heirs. Its altarpiece, by Domenico Malpiedi, depicts the Madonna of Loreto with Musical Angels. Flanking it are two works by Cristoforo Roncalli, the Nativity of Mary and the Visitation, likely dated 1605–1610.
- The fifth chapel, of the Annunciation, was built by the namesake confraternity and decorated by local artist Lucido Cerri. Its altar features Federico Zuccari’s Annunciation, bearing the Vannarelli family crest. Two works by Domenico Malpiedi adorn the sides: the Madonna Lauretana Revealing the Santa Casa’s Authenticity to Friar Paolo della Selva and the Marriage of the Virgin.
- The sixth chapel, dedicated to Saint Peter and owned by the Tamburelli family, sits right of the apse at the nave’s end. Its gilded, coffered wooden ceiling complements two Domenico Malpiedi paintings, the Pietà and the Delivery of the Keys. The organ parapet above features rectangular panels depicting numerous saints.
- The seventh chapel, the third on the left opposite the Crucifix chapel, is the Chapel of Mercy, built in 1873 to house Domenico Malpiedi’s Ascension after the Virgin depicted therein reportedly moved her eyes before a girl in June 1850.
- The eighth chapel, the second on the left, honors Saint Emygdius, erected by municipal decree on July 31, 1800, to thank the saint for sparing the town during the 1799 Marche earthquake of July 28.
- The Votive Chapel, next in line, commemorates San Ginesio’s fallen in World War I and was frescoed by Adolfo de Carolis in 1926. Inspired by the medieval sequence "Stabat Mater", it includes Latin cartouches with Passion scenes. The traditional Crucifix iconography features Saint Genesius and the Virgin, with the cross as a tree—recalling the True Cross legend tied to Adam’s tomb. A pelican atop pierces its chest to feed its young, symbolizing Christ’s sacrifice, surrounded by doves and green garlands signifying peace.

==== San Biagio Crypt ====
The crypt, also called the Oratory of San Biagio, is adorned with frescoes depicting the life of Saint Blaise and divided into three vaulted spaces, including the Chapel of the Fallen, decorated with 1406 frescoes by Lorenzo Salimbeni. Condottiero Trovarello di Paolo commissioned a work in the apse area.

== Decorations ==
The church is rich in artworks, though many were removed for safekeeping after the 2016–2017 Central Italy earthquakes. Among them is a fresco by a painter of the school of Perugino, a Madonna Enthroned with Child and Saint Genesius discovered in 1964, a fresco by Stefano Folchetti near the entrance, and a baptismal font decorated by Lamberto Massetani to the right.

=== Facade ===
The facade has decorations such as the Da Varano family crest, the coat of arms of Cardinal Giacomo Franzoni, and a stele (or panel) at the entrance. A painting of the noble Morichelli family is an indication of other decorations, now lost. The 11th-century portal features a splay with octagonal columns and quadrangular pillars topped by Lombard-style capitals in Romanesque design, flanked by sculptures by local artist Nino Patrizi.

==== The Formella ====
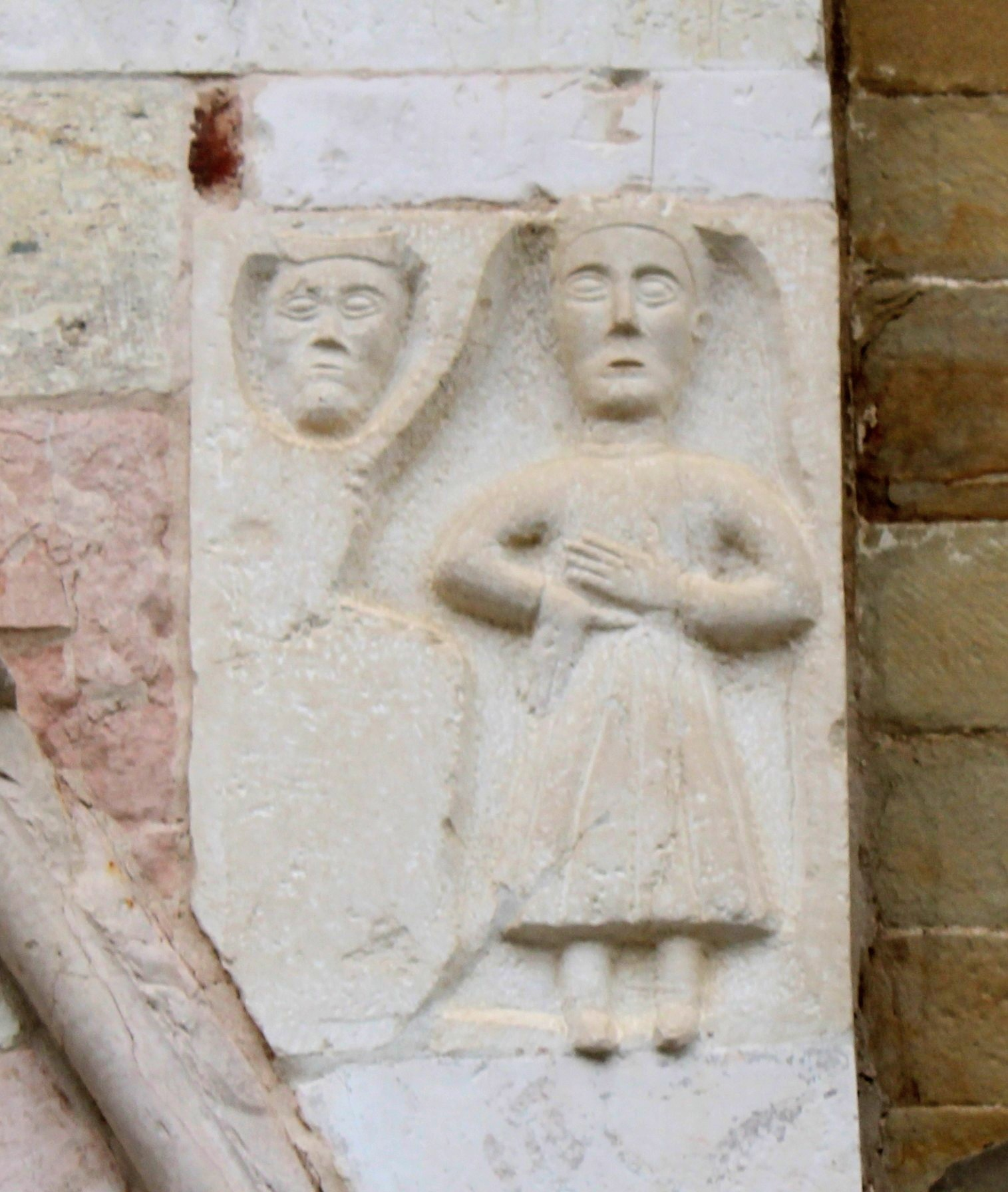
Stele depicting Genesius of Rome (right) with his actor’s mask (left)

The Formella, a bas-relief stone stele of unknown origin and date at the entrance, portrays a disproportionate figure beside a face. Its style resembles Lombard art, akin to the Male Figure in Stone at Milan’s Pinacoteca Ambrosiana. The features suggest a man, possibly Saint Genesius with his actor-mime mask.

== Archive ==
The Collegiate’s historical archive comprises 902 units, suffering damage and dispersal over time. Neglected for much of the 20th century, it was reorganized in 1992 by parish priest Vallerico Leone, with sorting by the Archdiocese of Camerino-San Severino Marche and the Marche Archival Superintendency into four main fonds:

- "Collegiate Parish Church of the Most Holy Annunciation" Fond: 177 medieval parchments documenting San Ginesio’s medieval era, established June 11, 1651. Archiving ceased in 1810 under Napoleonic rule, resuming in 1814.
- "Archives of the Confraternity" Fond: 88 units covering San Ginesio’s confraternities, excluding the suppressed Holy Trinity (formerly at San Filippo Neri) and Carmine (ex-Church of Sant’Agostino), mostly from the mid-20th century.
- "Archives of the Suppressed Parishes" Fond: Parish registers from the Church of San Francesco, San Gregorio Magno, and Santa Maria in Vepretis, created by Bishop Bruno Frattegiani’s decree on January 1, 1987. The San Michele archive has been merged with the Collegiate’s since 1767.
- Diplomatic Fond: Established in 1727 under Pope Benedict XIII’s Maxima Vigilantia, it holds 177 parchments from 1054 to 1840. Late 19th-century sources note its good condition, though some are now compromised by humidity and faded ink.

== See also ==
- San Ginesio

== Bibliography ==
- Marchegiani, Cristiano (2003). Il frontespizio in terracotta della pieve di San Ginesio. Una proposta gotica alemanna nella Marca di Martino V [The terracotta frontispiece of the parish church of San Ginesio. An Alemannic Gothic proposal in the March of Martino V] (in Italian). Ripatransone. ISBN 8886286155.
- Armellini, Luigi Maria (1990). La Pieve-Collegiata di San Ginesio. Guida storico-artistica [The Collegiate Church of San Ginesio. Historical-artistic guide] (in Italian). San Ginesio.
- La Chiesa collegiata di San Ginesio. Una storia ritrovata [The Collegiate Church of San Ginesio. A rediscovered history] (in Italian). CISG. 2012. ISBN 978-8895385037.
- Comune di San Ginesio (2006). San Ginesio (in Italian). San Ginesio.
