= Giuseppe Turchi =

Giuseppe Turchi may refer to:

- Giuseppe Turchi (painter, born 1759) (1759–1799), Italian painter
- Giuseppe Turchi (painter, born 1840) (1840–1895), Italian painter
