= Pinacoteca Civica Fortunato Duranti =

Museum in Montefortino, Marche, Italy

The Pinacoteca Civica Fortunato Duranti is a museum in Montefortino, Italy.

In 1850, the 19th-century painter and collector Fortunato Duranti donated hundreds of items or art and furniture from his collection to the town of Montefortino. The collection is now displayed in the Pinacoteca Civica Fortunato Duranti museum.

== Paintings in Pinacoteca Civica Fortunato Duranti ==
Label	Painter	Work	Date	Link
1	Pietro Alemanno	Ecce Homo with instruments of passion	15th century	
2	Pietro Alemanno	Madonna with Child, St. Sebastian, and St. Cosma	15th century	
3	Pietro Alemanno	St. Lucy	15th century	
4		Madonna with Child and two angels	15th century	
5	Francesco Botticini	Madonna with Child	15th century	
6		Nativity	16th century	
7	Carlo Dolci	Christ crowned with thorns	17th century	
8	Flemish or Dutch school	Man with turban lights a pipe	17th century	
9	Lombard/Veneto school	Woman with standard (St. Ursula?)	17th century	
10		Still life of fruits	16th–18th centuries	
11		Still life of fruits	17th century	
12	Cristoforo Munari	Still life of fruits with lute and musical score	18th century	
13	Giovanni Paolo Castelli (lo Spadino)	Still life of fruits with glassware and biscotti	18th century	
14	Giovanni Paolo Castelli (lo Spadino)	Still life of fruits	18th century	
15	Giovanni Paolo Castelli (lo Spadino)	Still life of fruits	18th century	
16	Giovanni Paolo Castelli (lo Spadino)	Still life of fruits	18th century	
17	Giovanni Paolo Castelli (lo Spadino)	Still life of fruits with two pigeons	18th century	
18	Giovanni Paolo Castelli (lo Spadino)	Still life of fruits with decorative bowl, two bottles, & wine-glass	18th century	
19	Roman School	Still life of fruits with pink flowers	16th–18th centuries	
20	Neapolitan School	Still life with fish	16th–18th centuries	
21	Central Italian School	Still life with flower vase	17th century	
22	Roman School	Veduta of Piazza del Popolo (Rome)	16th–18th centuries	
23	Roman School	Veduta of the Pantheon with belltowers	18th century	
24	Alessio de Marchis (attributed)	Landscape, rocky and with pedestrians	18th century	
25	Alessio de Marchis (attributed)	Landscape of river with pedestrians	18th century	
26	Pietro da Cortona	Madonna with Child and St. Martina	17th century	
27	School of Emilia	Holy Family	17th century	
28		Madonna with Child	18-20th centuries	
29		Holy Family	18th century	
30	Corrado Giaquinto	Circe (?)	18th century	
31	Corrado Giaquinto	Birth of the Virgin Mary	18th century	
32	Corrado Giaquinto	St. Nicolas blesses warriors	18th century	
33	Corrado Giaquinto	Hagar and Ishmael	18th century	
34	Corrado Giaquinto	Mosè receives commandments	18th century	
35	Corrado Giaquinto	Trinity	18th century	
36	Roman School	Alexander the Great in temple of Jerusalem	18th century	
37	Roman School	St. John evangelist contemplates Virgin Mary's coronation	18th century	
38	Roman School	Education of Virgin Mary and angels	18th century	
39	Unknown	Putto with skull	17th century	
40	Unknown	Putto with plume and palette	17th century	
41		Faun/ girl with mirror/ sleeping girl	18th century	
42	Roman School	Holy Family and St. John	18th century	
43	Cristoforo Unterberger	St Ponziano in Lion’s den	18th century	
44	Cristoforo Unterberger	Saints Ignatius & Filippo Neri	18th century	
45	Cristoforo Unterberger	St. Ubaldo intercedes with Madonna and Child for the orphans	18th century	
46	Cristoforo Unterberger	St. Sebastian & maidens	18th century	
47	Cristoforo Unterberger	Christ at prayer in garden (Gesthemane)	18th century	
48	Cristoforo Unterberger	Flagellation of Christ	18th century	
50	Cristoforo Unterberger	Assumption of the Madonna	18th century	
51	Cristoforo Unterberger	Madonna at the foot of cross	18th century	
52	Cristoforo Unterberger	Madonna at foot of cross and angel with instruments of the Passion	18th century	
53	Ignazio Unterberger	Triumph of Bacchus	18th century	
54	Roman School	St. Anthony of Padua & Madonna with Child	18th century	
55	Roman School	Christ: Deposition from the Cross	18th century	
56	Fortunato Duranti	Self-portrait	19th century	
57	Fortunato Duranti	Madonna with Child '	19th century	
58	Fortunato Duranti	Holy Family with St. John	19th century	
59	Fortunato Duranti	Holy Family	19th century	
60	Nicola d'Ancona	St. Lucy, St. Anthony of Padua, and St. Bernard of Siena	14th–16th centuries	
61	Pier Francesco Fiorentino	Madonna with child, San Michael Archangel, and St. Raphael with Tobias	15th century	
62	Marchigian School	Madonna with Child Blessing e San Michele Archangel (fragment)	15th century (?)	
63	Praneda Ludovico	Madonna	19th century	
64	Unknown	Madonna reading prayer book		

== Drawings by Fortunato Duranti in Pinacoteca ==
Label	Work	Link
1	Madonna with Child (drawing)	
2	Battle scene with infantry & knights (drawing)	
3	Study of Funerary urn with three mourners	
4	Nativity	
5	Genre Scene in front of the entrance to a building	
6	Madonna with Child enthroned and a Saint	
7	Pagan Scenes(?)	
8	Bust of old man in 1500s costume	
9	Nativity indoors	
10	Study of two figures dressed in ancient garb	
11	Female saint playing the lute with other saints and two putti	
12	Rest during flight to Egypt	
13	Madonna with Child, St. John, and angel	
14	Madonna with Child in Landscape with castle & fantastic animals	
15	Holy Family, Sant'Anna, and St. John	
16	Veduta of the Campidoglio stairs	
17	Study of six heads and masks/ Landscape	
18	Madonna Child, Joseph, & St. John/ Madonna enthroned with female Saint & musical angel	
19	Study of five nudes, two amphora, and dove	
20	Study of five putti (recto)/ Study of three putti (verso)	
21	Madonna with Child	
22	Madonna with Child	
23	Woman playing lute	
24	Three female nudes	
25	Northern Landscape with knights and two male figures	
26	Pagan Scene with four male figures and oxen	
27	Madonna with Child	
28	Series of female nudes, a male nude, with Venus	
29	Male nude with panneggio	
30	Madonna with Child painted by St. Luke (front)/ Nativity (back)	
31	Painter’s studio	
32	Series of six figures one sitting atop with panoply	
33	Madonna with Child sitting on acanthus with two horses	
34	Madonna with Child in glory, Saints Peter and Paul	
35	Head of a classical statue	
36	1800s	
38	Study of three women’s heads	
39	Two studies of Madonna with Child and St. John	
40	Young saint leaning on sphere with foot on serpent, oxen skull, amphora	
41	Rest during flight to Egypt	
42	Allegorical figure/St. Raphael Archangel & Tobias	
43	Hermit saint and two angels	
44	Expulsion of Adam and Eve from Paradise (?) (drawing)	
45	Classic scene with four figures(drawing)	
46	Christ preaching to crowds (drawing)	
47	Four dancing women (drawing)	
48	Classic scene	
49	Madonna with Child and angels (drawing)	
50	Classic scene with female figure	
51	Study of nine feminine figures	
52	Female nudes in with fantastic landscape	
	Religious scene with preachers	
54	Madonna with child	
	Head of Silenus	
56	Holy scene with preacher (Christ?)	
57	Madonna with Child	
	Classic scene with two figures	
59	Rest during flight to Egypt with St. John	
60	Deposition with Madonna & St. John the evangelist	
61	Apparition of child Jesus to St. Anthony of Padua	
	Christ preaching to people	
63	Holy Family	
64	Madonna with Child	
65	Christ Blessing	
66	Holy Family	
67	Holy Family	
	Last Judgement	
69	Study of male and female nudes	
	Male nude (recto)/ Male nude (verso)	
71	Feminine figure and putto	
	Madonna with Child in a lunette	
	Dramatic scene (martyrdom) with column	
74	Madonna with Child	
	Church with figure	
76	Madonna with Child	
77	Male nude	
78	Kneeling man picking up fruit for basket and knight	
	Madonna with Child	
80	Angel, mirror and fasces	
	Nude female combing hair	
82	Biblical scene (?)	
83	Woman with knight	
84	Madonna with Child, St. John & 2 Saints/ Madonna with Child enthroned with female Saint	
85	Figures inside church	
86	Madonna with Child	
87	Madonna with Child & St. John	
88	Madonna with Child	
89	Seated man (Marchigian drawing)	
90	Apparition of the Madonna with Child and Saint (Marchigian drawing)	
