= Antonio Longo (painter) =

Italian painter

Antonio Longo (14 April 1742- 26 May 1820) was an Italian painter and priest in a late Baroque style.

== Biography ==
Born to a family of farmers in Varena in the Fiemme Valley of the province of Trento. He attended seminary in Trento and was ordained as a priest in 1766. He was vice-curato for the parish of Varena. His initial training was with a local painter of Val di Fiemme, Giuseppe Alberti. In Fiemme, he also profited from and later collaborated with Michelangelo and Cristoforo Unterberger. He also moved to Rome in 1780.

His religious duties limited his artistic endeavours. In Rome, he served as chaplain in the Convitto dell'Anima, and in part through Cristoforo Unterberger, who was Prince of the Accademia di San Luca, was able to befriend Anton Raphael Mengs and Pompeo Battoni. Longo would soon join the academy. In 1798, when Rome was occupied by Napoleonic armies, Longo, as an Austrian citizen, was forced to return to Varena, where he continued to paint. Among his collaborators back in Val di Fiemme was Valentino Rovisi of Moena.

Longo also practised architectural design and designed the bell towers of the churches of San Sebastiano in Cavalese and Sant’Eliseo in Tesero. He painted an altarpiece of the Rosary for the church of Cavalese.

Among his works are frescoes for the Palazzo della Magnifica Comunità of Fiemme a Cavalese, paintings in the Museo Provinciale di Trento, and the Franciscan convents of Cavalese and Cles. He painted sacred subjects for churches in Val di Fiemme and Val di Fassa, Aldeno, Agordo, Pergine Valsugana, Madrano (a frazione within Pergine Valsugana), Riva del Garda, Salorno, Egna, Mezzolombardo, Mezzocorona, Margreid an der Weinstraße, Montalbiano (a frazione within Valfloriana), and Baselga di Pinè. He died in Varena.

== Other sources ==
- 'Antonio Longo Pittore 1742-1820 (monograph), by Niccolo Rasmo, Verona, 1984.
- Enciclopedia Treccani, Dizionario Biografico degli Italiani - Volume 65 (2005), entry by Chiara Felicetti.
