= Fortunato Duranti =

Italian painter (1787–1863)

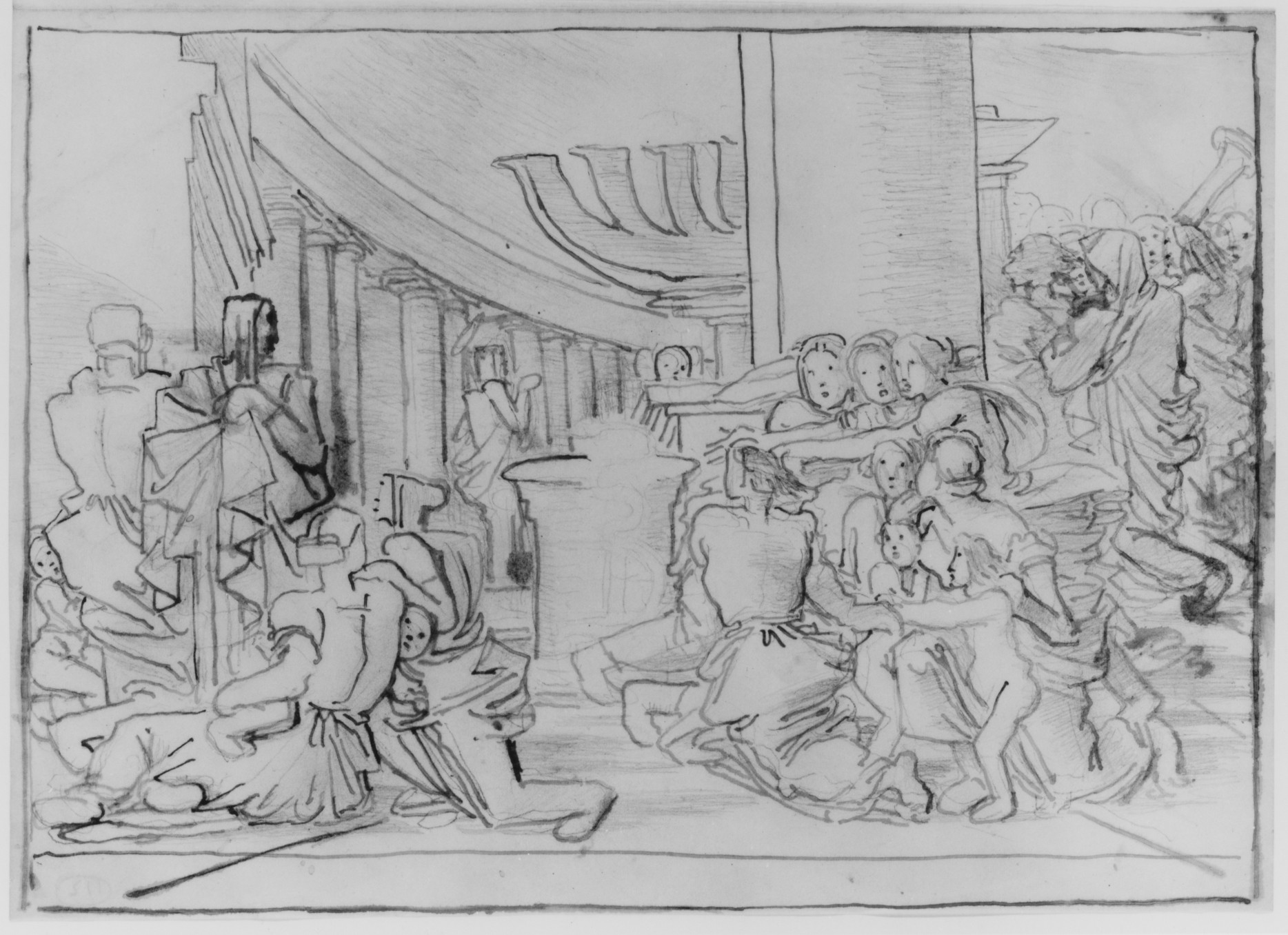
Congregation in a Temple

Fortunato Duranti (25 September 1787 – 7 February 1863) was an Italian painter and collector.

== Biography ==
Duranti was born at Montefortino, in what are now the Marche, then part of the Papal States. His father was a shoemaker of limited means. In 1807, he traveled to Rome to study under the patronage of Cardinal Bernardino Honorati in the school of Domenico Conti Bazzani, who had trained with Giuseppe Bazzani and Pompeo Batoni. In Rome he befriended Nicola Consoni, the director of the Academy of Saint Luke, and Tommaso Minardi, the pre-eminent Italian Neoclassic painter in Rome. He was influenced by Vincenzo Camuccini, Pelagio Palagi, Felice Giani, and Bartolomeo Pinelli.

When the cardinal Honorati died, he became an antiquarian. On a planned trip to Germany in 1815, he was arrested and his works confiscated. In the 1820s, he became mainly a printmaker, acquiring an expressive graphic style of works influenced by the works of Henry Fuseli and Francisco Goya, but still with an Italianate religious thematic. He is now best known for his etchings and drawings. He painted little, but thousands of his drawings are conserved by the Commune of Montefortino or were collected Giovan Batiste Carducci from Fermo.

Never married, and despite his often precarious economic well-being, Fortunato when he died donated hundreds of items of art and furniture he had collected to the town of Montefortino, including paintings attributed to Piero della Francesca, Ghirlandaio, Carlo Crivelli, Corrado Giaquinto, Pietro da Cortona, Jacopo da Bassano, Christopher Unterberger, Perugino, Carlo Maratta, Cunx Taddeo, Rosa da Tivoli, Annibale Carracci, Carlo Dolci, Anton Raphael Mengs, Pierre Subleyras, Placido Costanzi, Raffaellino da Reggio, and Giuseppe Ghezzi. The remainder of the collection is displayed in the local Pinacoteca Civica Fortunato Duranti.
