= Giovanni Paolo Castelli =

Italian painter (1659–1730)

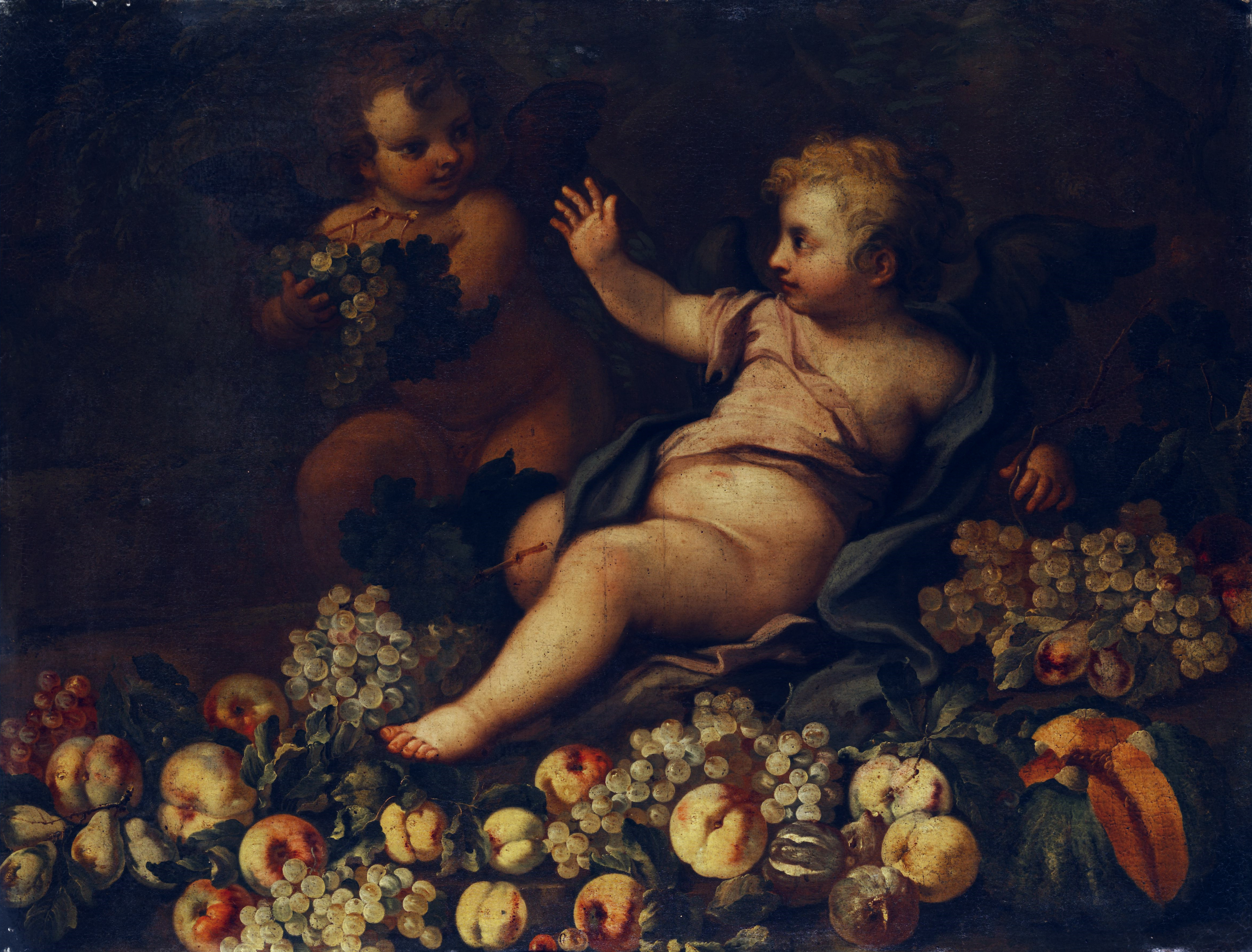
Fruit still life with two putts. Oil on canvas. 86 x 110 cm.

Giovanni Paolo Castelli (1659–1730) was a painter, active in Rome, Papal States, painting still-life paintings of bowls of fruit and flowers. Over half a dozen works are collected in the Pinacoteca Civica Fortunato Duranti.
