= San Salvatore, Sant'Angelo in Pontano =

Roman Catholic church in Macerata province, Italy

San Salvatore
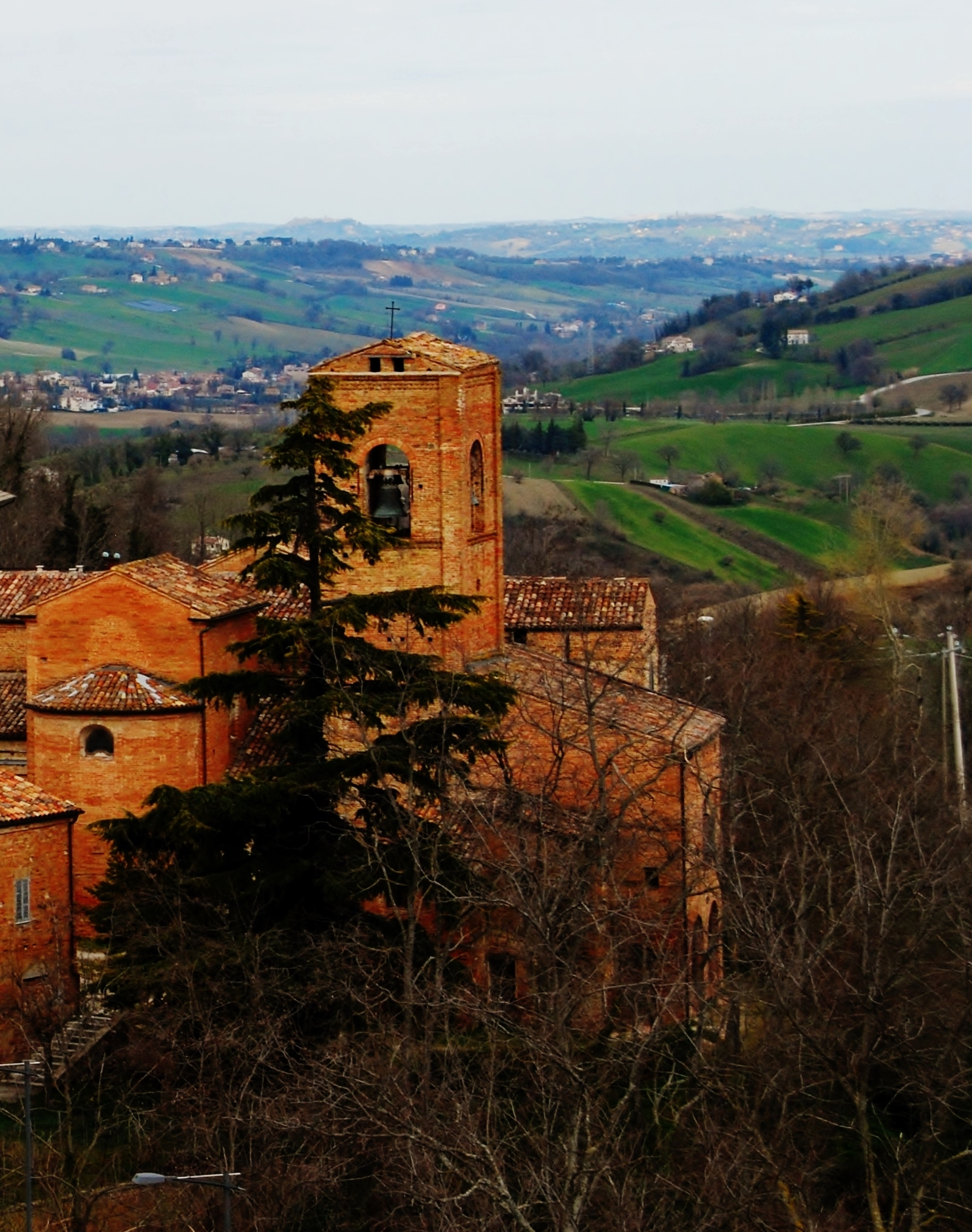
- San Salvatore, Sant'Angelo in Pontano
- San Salvatore
- 43°06′00.5″N 13°23′51.7″E
- Location: Sant'Angelo in Pontano, province of Macerata, region of Marche, Italy
- Country: Italy
- Denomination: Roman Catholic

History
- Status: Church

Architecture
- Functional status: Active
- Architectural type: Church
- Style: Romanesque-Gothic
- Years built: 14th century

San Salvatore is a Romanesque-Gothic-style Roman Catholic church located in the town of Sant'Angelo in Pontano, province of Macerata, region of Marche, Italy.

== History ==
The church, in Romanesque-Gothic style, dates back to the first half of the XII century. The interior is divided into three naves, of which the central one has a trussed ceiling, while the lateral ones have a cross. The plan became a Greek cross with the addition of two side chapels in the 1700s. The crypt, like the bell tower, was added in the 14th century and is as large as the church above, with brick arches and cross vaults.

Inside, some fine holy water fonts made from ancient capitals, and on the fourth pillar on the right, a fresco, perhaps to be attributed to the circle of Salimbeni of Sanseverino, depicting the Madonna and Child. It preserves a Crudeli organ of the late eighteenth century recently restored

Since 1169 we have news of the nearby Rectory, led by an abbot and faithful to the rule of Sant'Agostino. He became prioress and, in 1807, archpriest.
