= Santa Maria delle Rose, Sant'Angelo in Pontano =

Catholic church in Italy

Santa Maria delle Rose is a Baroque-style, Roman Catholic church located in the town of Sant'Angelo in Pontano, province of Macerata, region of Marche, Italy.

== History ==
A male eremitic monastery was founded at the site in the 7th century, that was subsidiary to the Abbey of Farfa. In the 15th century, it passed to a Benedictine order of nuns, and the site likely housed a small Romanesque-style church for use by the cloistered nuns.

The present church was refurbished in 1764. The layout includes a single nave with semicircular apse. In 1810, the monastery was suppressed, only to be re-opened in 1822. But in 1861, all the property was expropriated and much was sold; in 1880, the nuns were expelled. They moved into local private houses, and maintained as possible a cloistered life. Only in the 1990s, did the convent re-establish expansion.

The interior of the church is highly decorated in Baroque fashion. The main altar has a frame flanked by columns with gilded capitals. The barrel-vault ceiling has stucco decoration, but also frames tempera paintings depicting St Joseph, St John the Evangelist and the Assumption of the Virgin.

The original paintings were moved to the new monastery in via Castello and include a Madonna of the Roses and Saints Benedict, Peter and Francis of Paola, attributed to Domenico Malpiedi and an altarpiece depicting the Divine Shepherdess (1776), also known as the Madonna of the Roses by Nicola Monti.
