= Domenico Malpiedi =

Italian painter

Domenico Malpiedi (active 1590–1605) was an Italian painter of the late-Renaissance. He was a pupil of Federigo Barocci. He was born at San Ginesio. Malpiedi painted canvases for the churches near his birthplace, including Santa Maria delle Rose and San Nicola in Sant'Angelo in Pontano. In 1601–1603, he painted in Osimo. He was likely related to the painter Francesco Malpiedi.

== Works ==
- Two angels worship the Dove of the Holy Spirit (first half of the seventeenth century)
- Saints Lucia, Biagio and Apollonia, (first half of the seventeenth century)
- The birth of the Virgin Mary (first half of the 17th century)
- Martyrdom of Saint Bartholomew, (first half of the XVII century)
- Sant'Amico di Rambona, (first half of the 17th century)
- Saint Michael the Archangel, (first half of the XVII century)
- Saints Lucia, Biagio and Apollonia, (attributed - first half of the seventeenth century)
- Madonna di Loreto with Saints, (first half of the 17th century)
- Madonna di Loreto with musician angels, (first half of the 17th century)
- Annunciation, (first half of the 17th century)
- Saints Lucia, Biagio and Apollonia, (first half of the seventeenth century)
