= San Nicola, Sant'Angelo in Pontano =

Church in Sant'Angelo, Italy

San Nicola is a Roman Catholic church and former convent located in the town of Sant'Angelo in Pontano, province of Macerata, region of Marche, Italy.

== History ==
The church and convent, dedicated to St Nicholas of Tolentino, patron saint of the village of Sant'Angelo where he was born, were established in the 13th century by the Augustinian order, but refurbished over the centuries. The complex stands on its highest part, in a panoramic square, with the church next to the Convent of the Augustinians. The original church of S. Pietro di Posmonte, annexed to the first convent and probably later rebuilt, was named after Sant'Agostino. It was after 1446, the year of the canonization of Nicola di Compagnone, that his dedication was changed to that of San Nicola. At the end of the 16th century, the whole complex needed a radical adaptation and restructuring. At the beginning of the seventeenth century, Fra'Nicola Giovannetti prior to S.Angelo and Provinciale della Marca promoted the rearrangement project and the church was renovated and enlarged in a Baroque style, with the addition in its eastern part of the chapel of San Nicola, frescoed by Domenico Malpiedi of San Ginesio. The church preserves some valuable paintings and a wooden choir made in those years. It also houses an organ of the early eighteenth century, renovated following the fall of lightning in April 1758 by the organ builder Francesco Fedeli, of the famous organ family of the Rocchetta di Camerino.
