= Christopher Unterberger =

Italian painter (1732–1798)

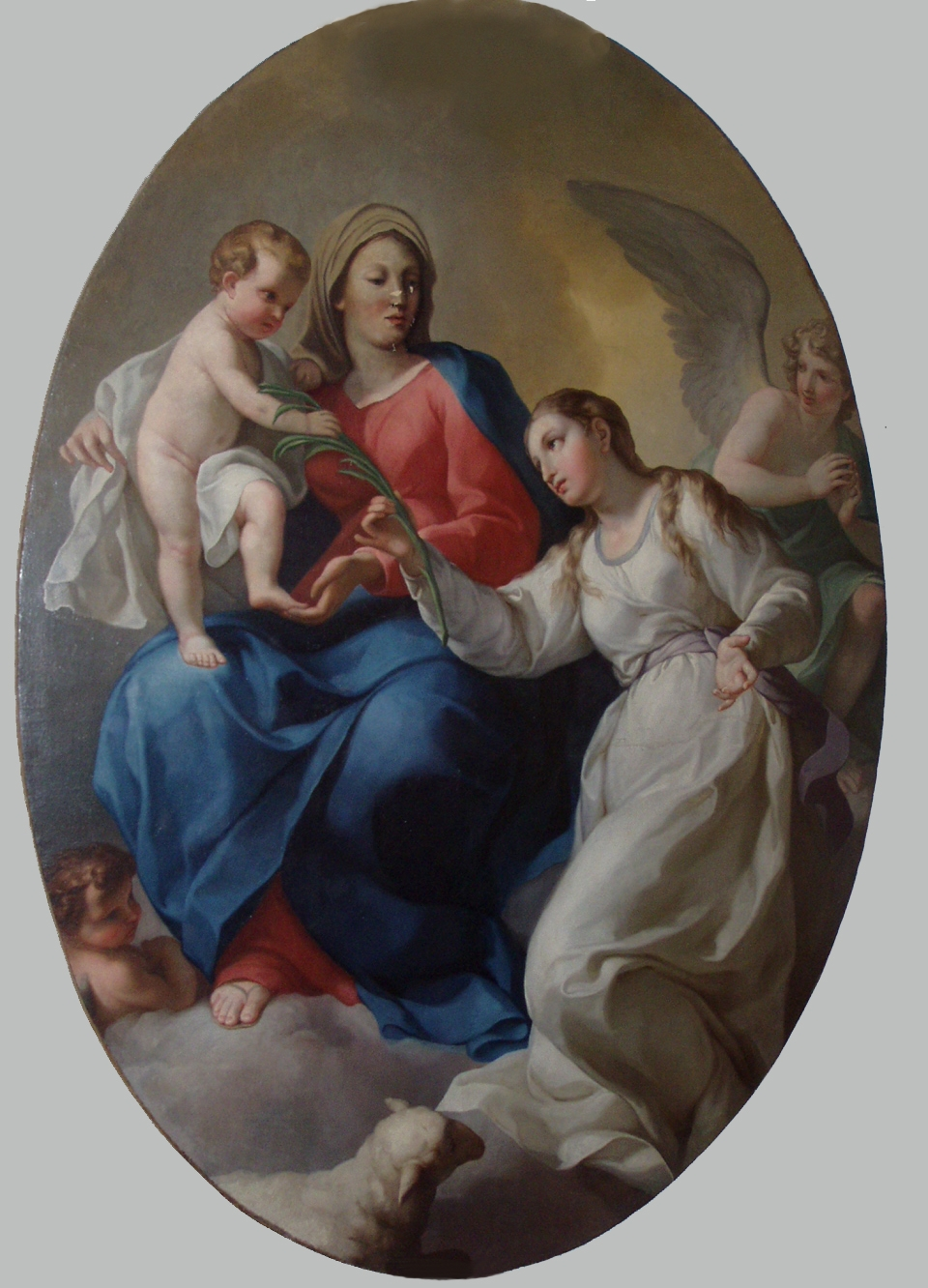
The Madonna and Saint Agnes

Christopher Unterberger, also Christoph or Cristoforo (27 May 1732 – 25 January 1798) was an Italian painter of the early-Neoclassical period.

== Biography ==
He was born in Cavalese in County of Tyrol (today located in Trentino, Italy). He was initially taught drawing by an uncle, Franz Sebald Unterberger, and then in the Academy of Fine Arts, Vienna, where another uncle, Michelangelo Unterberger, was the co-director from 1751-1758. He then traveled to Venice and Verona, where he studied under Giambettino Cignaroli; and finally in 1758, to Rome.

In Rome, he befriended and fell under the influence of Anton Rafael Mengs, and copied the works of Pietro da Cortona, in whose style he produced two altar-pieces of St. Jules and St. Agnes for the cathedral of Brixen. In 1772, he joined the Accademia di San Luca under the sponsorship of Mengs. In 1772, he and Mengs were commissioned to decorate the Papyrus room in the Vatican Library with themes from classic Roman frescoes, including grotteschi and other painted ornament,

Starting in 1780, he led a team of artists replicating on canvas the Vatican Loggia designed by Bramante and Raphael. The commission had been communicated by Giacomo Quarenghi, the architect to Empress Catherine II of Russia. Quarenghi replicated the classic decoration gallery in the Hermitage in St. Petersburg.

He also decorated the Stanza d'Ercole (1784–86) in Villa Borghese for Marcantonio Borghese. Once called Stanza del Sonno because of the statue of Sleep by Alessandro Algardi. The frescoes depict the Apotheosis of Hercules in the center surrounded by four of stories of his life, Receiving the horns of Achelous; Hercules and Lichas; Nessus and Deianeira, and the Death of Hercules. In 1790-91, Unterberger also helped design the playful Fontana dei Cavalli Marini (fountain of the sea horses) and the architectural capriccio of a hemi-facade (simulated ruins) of the Temple of Faustina in the Borghese gardens.

His works were mostly historical, but he also executed genre subjects, landscapes, and fruit and flower-pieces. He painted some genre paintings now in the Liechtenstein Gallery in Vienna. He painted a Madonna with St. John for the Ferdinandeum at Innsbruck; a Martyrdom of St. Pontianus for the cathedral at Spoleto; and an Assumption for the Loreto Cathedral. A number of his works can be seen in the Pinacoteca Civica Fortunato Duranti. He saw the commission for the decoration of a ceiling of the ducal palace of Genoa go to Giandomenico Tiepolo instead of him. He died in Rome.His brother Ignaz Unterberger was a prominent painter who was active in Vienna. One of his pupils was Giuseppe Turchi and Antonio Longo.
