= Franz Sebald Unterberger =

South Tyrolean painter (1706–1776)

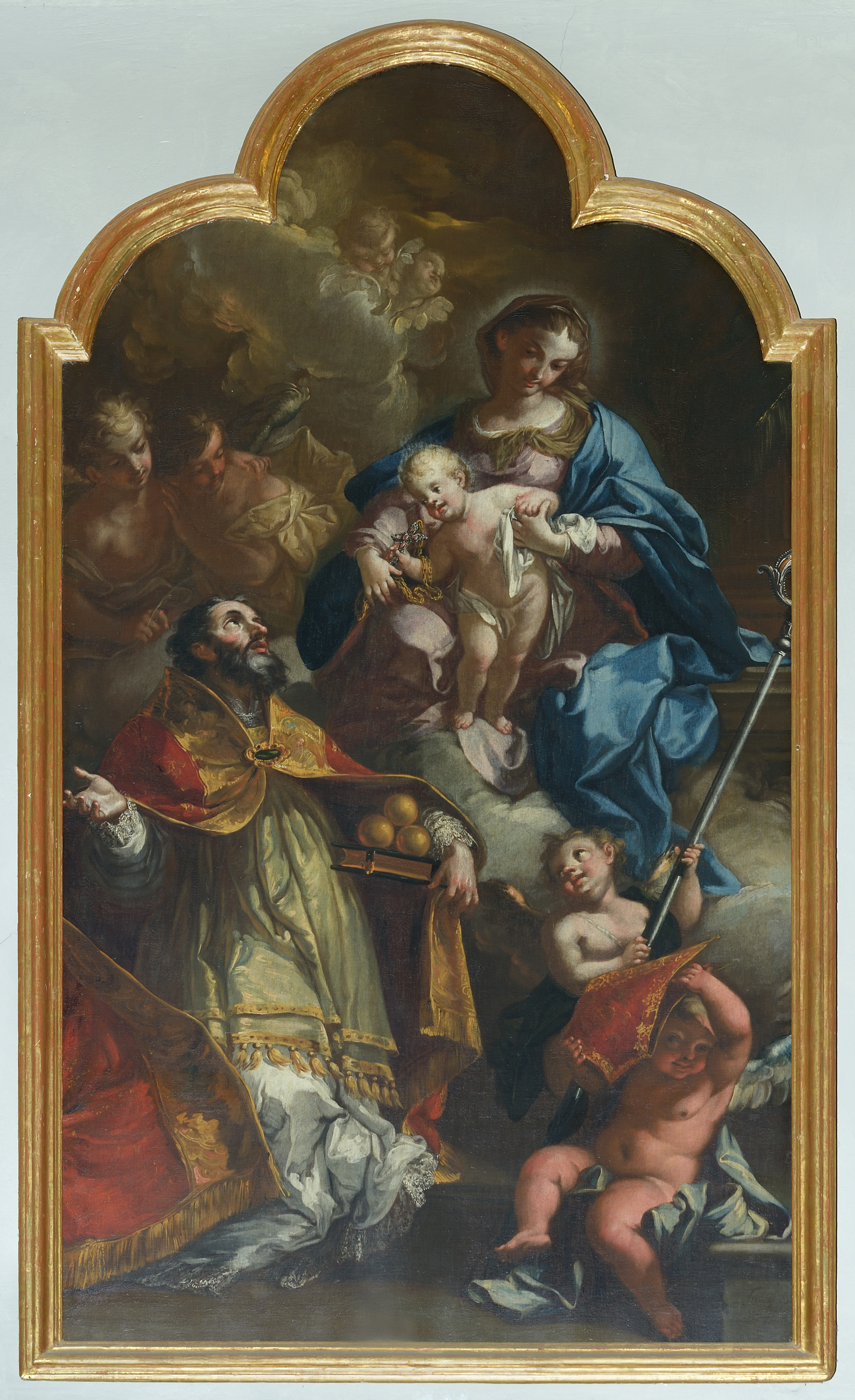
Mary Worshipped by St. Nicholas, Pfarrkirche Kastelruth

Franz Sebald Unterberger, or Unterperger (1 August 1706 – 23 January 1776) was a South Tyrolean painter in the Baroque style.

== Biography ==
He was born in Cavalese. His father, Christoph Unterberger (1668–1747), was an Imperial forest warden. His grandfather, Oswald, had come from Pustertal to Fleimstal sometime around 1620.

His brother, Michelangelo, and his nephews, Ignaz and Christoph, were also painters. According to the art historian Nicolò Rasmo, Franz was the most talented of the group, but received insufficient recognition during his lifetime.

His artistic training took place almost entirely within the family environment; primarily from Michelangelo, who was eleven years his senior. Time spent in Venice had a significant stylistic effect; with especially notable influence derived from the works of Giovanni Battista Pittoni and Giovanni Antonio Guardi.

He spent great deal of his life in Brixen, before returning to Cavalese in his old age. He never married. His works include numerous altarpieces in South Tyrol, Trentino and North Tyrol, as well as a collection of small, Biblical portraits.

In 1976, on the 200th anniversary of his death, a major retrospective was held at the Stadtmuseum Bozen.
