= Sant'Angelo in Pontano =

- Comune
- Comune di Sant'Angelo in Pontano
- Coat of arms

- Location within Italy Location within Marche
- Coordinates: 43°6′N 13°24′E
- Country: Italy
- Region: Marche
- Province: Macerata (MC)

Government
  - Mayor: Vanda Broglia (Uniti per Rinascere)

Area
  - Total: 27.4 km^{2} (10.6 sq mi)
- Elevation: 473 m (1,552 ft)

Population (1 January 2019)
  - Total: 1,361
  - Density: 49.7/km^{2} (129/sq mi)
- Demonym: Santangiolesi
- Time zone: UTC+1 (CET)
  - Summer (DST): UTC+2 (CEST)
- Postal code: 62020
- Dialing code: 0733
- Patron saint: Nicholas of Tolentino
- Saint day: 10 October
- Website: Official website

Sant'Angelo in Pontano is a comune (municipality) in the Province of Macerata in the Italian region Marche, located about 60 kilometres (37 mi) south of Ancona and about 25 kilometres (16 mi) south of Macerata. It stands in pleasant position with a panoramic view over the adjacent valleys of Ete Morto river and Tenna river.

The town lies in the west of a 5 km radius circular region with an annular drainage pattern possibly. Possibly this corresponds to a mud diapir or astrobleme.

== History ==
In Roman times this territory had to be a vicus or a pagus. With the arrival of Christianity, the cult of St. Michael the Archangel spread which, still today, appears in the name. In the Lombard period the town had reached a considerable size and was part of the Duchy of Spoleto, more precisely in the Gastaldato di Ponte. Founded in 757, at the time of Duke Alboin, the castle of Ponte extended its power over a large territory which included Visso, Triponzo, Norcia, San Pellegrino, Campi, Savelli and, in the Casciano territory, Poggioprimocaso.

In the seventh century the convent Santa Maria delle Rose was built by the Benedictines and shortly afterwards the town passed under the control of the abbey of Farfa. In the tenth century local nobles took over. In December 1263, Sant'Angelo in Pontano becomes free commune, but after a few years it submits to the city of Tolentino, and subsequently to Fermo. In the mid-fourteenth century, following the attempt of Cardinal Albornoz to reduce the castles of the Marca under the dominion of the Pope, Sant'Angelo underwent the siege and conquest by the papal troops.

In 1413 it was owned by the Da Varano family and then returned to Fermo, twenty years later, following the campaign of Francesco Sforza. Taken back by the troops of the Papal States, it was sacked and seriously damaged. However, damage was soon repaired and Sant'Angelo returned to be part of the territory of Fermo, following its the fate until the Napoleonic period when it was included in the Department of Tronto. In 1860, at the time of the suppression of the province of Fermo, it became part of Macerata district.

=== Name history ===
The first part of the name is a reference to Saint Michael Archangel, worshipped by the Lombards, whose image appears on the village coat of arms on a bridge (recalling the Italian word ponte, from the Latin pons, pontis); according to popular tradition, the last word derives from pantano meaning swamp or marsh, as it seems that in early times there was some marshland in the valley below the village.

More likely, the name comes from being Sant'Angelo located in the administrative district of the Gastaldato Pontano, established by the Lombard Duke of Spoleto.

In old scroll documents the name is transcribed as follows:

- in 967 : "Curtem Sancti Angeli in loco qui vocatur Murgianum".
- in 998 : "Curtem Sancti Angeli in loco Margiano".
- in about 1070 : "Curtis Sancti Angeli in Morgizano quae nunc ab incolis loci in Pontano dicitur".
- in 11th century : "In Sancto Angelo in Merzano terram et castanetum".
- in 1084 : "Curtem Sancti Angeli in Murgiano".
- in 1118 : "Curtem Sancti Angeli in Mariano".

The village was called Sant'Angelo in Murgiano until the times of the Lombard ruling and after this it was called, as it is still called Sant'Angelo in Pontano.

=== Patron Saint ===
The patron saint of the town is Saint Nicholas of Tolentino, born (1245) and raised in holiness in Sant'Angelo, where he consecrated his life, joining the Augustinian family.

== Main historical buildings ==
- Church of San Michele, built over a former Lombard chapel of which a basrelief remains today.
- Collegiata del SS. Salvatore (early 12th century), in Romanesque-Gothic style. It has a nave and two aisles. The crypt is from the 14th century
- San Nicola church (late 15th to 18th centuries). Remarkable frescos and paintings (Cappellone)
- Santa Maria delle Rose Benedictine monastery, old church and former monastery complex (now Town Hall)
- Rocca (castle) of San Filippo (13th century), outside the town.
- Watchtower (known from 1397)
- Municipal Theatre N.A. Angeletti (19th century)

== Economy ==
=== Agriculture and breeding ===
Centuries of peasant history have shaped the economic landscape of Sant'Angelo. The crops are various and typical of the Macerata and Fermo hills. These include wheat, forage, sunflower, vine, olive tree. An oil mill for the production of oil and small businesses for the production and processing of cheeses, meats and salami, honey and other typical food specialties of the area are still active in the village and in its hamlets and countryside.

=== Crafts ===
Among the more traditional, widespread and active economic activities are artisanal ones, such as those related to the footwear, leather goods and weaving sector, aimed at the production of valuable products.

=== Small industry ===
In the hamlet of Passo Sant'Angelo, on the route of the Fiastra valley there is a PIP area where some small industrial and logistic activities take place.

=== Tourism ===
Alongside the traditional hospitality and catering structures that have been present and well established for a long time, other hospitality structures such as farmhouses and holiday homes are being developed, in the name of sustainable tourism, also recognized abroad.
