= Ignaz Unterberger =

Italian painter (1748–1797)

- Born: 24 July 1748; Gaßlöss, Holy Roman Empire
- Died: 4 December 1797 (aged 49); Vienna, Archduchy of Austria
- Known for: Painting

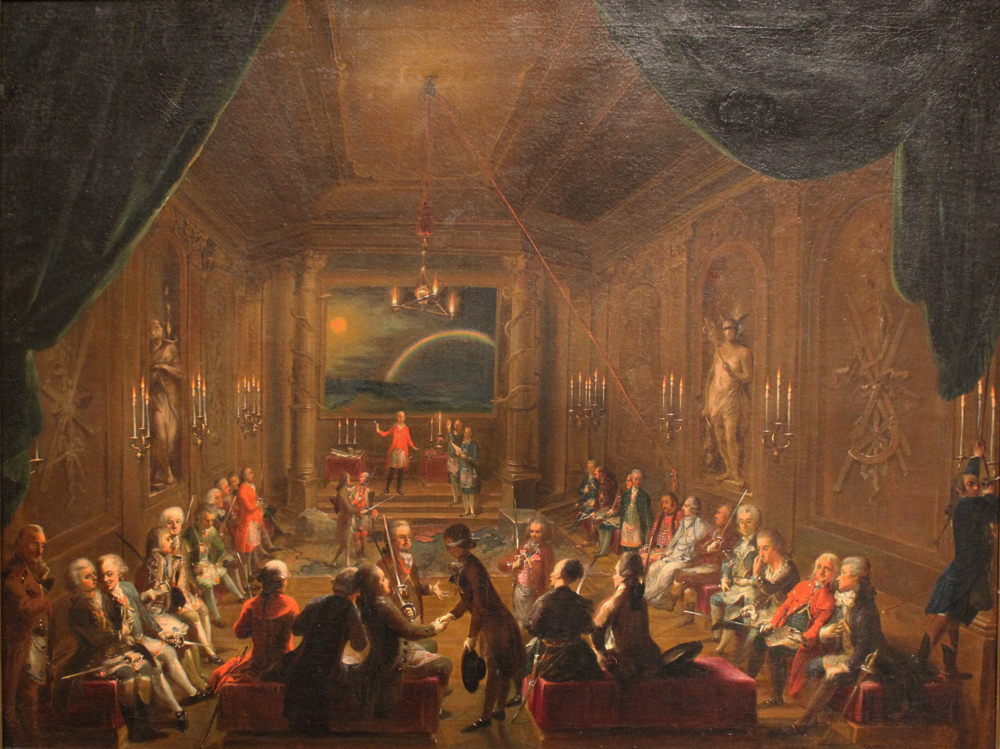
A masonic lodge in Vienna in 1789, by Unterberger

Ignaz Unterberger (24 July 1748, Cavalese – 4 December 1797, Vienna) was a painter and printmaker, who was also an inventor. He lived his entire life in the Holy Roman Empire. He was a member of a large dynasty of Tyrolean artists.

== Biography ==
Unterberger was probably born on 24 July 1748 in Gaßlöss (now called Cavalese), located in the County of Tyrol, today in Italy. His initial artistic instruction came from his uncle Franz Sebald Unterberger (1706-1776). Unterberger Senior taught his nephew the style of the Tyrol. This was High Baroque - famed for intricate church altarpieces, sculpture and frescoes. Artists working in Vienna and Salzburg found themselves training in Rome, including Ignaz's elder brother. Christoph Unterberger (1732-1798)'s influence as a member of the Accademia di San Luca provided Ignaz with access to a pivotal group of Italian artists when he arrived in Rome in 1769. His ability to capture the Italian style was such that his painting 'Maternal Love' was thought to have been Correggio's.

Unterberger was a highly capable artist, with experience in creating frescoes, altarpiece paintings, bambocciata and marble work. The artist stated that he only painted for a livelihood, but printmaking was his real passion. Unterberger's printmaking is not particularly well-known, although some of his prints were included in the British Museum's 1994 exhibition and catalogue 'Printmaking in the Age of Goethe'. He did not engage in printmaking until he returned to Vienna from Rome in 1773, when he applied himself exclusively to the mezzotint. His inventions included an excavating machine for digging canals, a foot-pedal for the harp, and a machine for preparing mezzotint plates.

Unterberger was never made a member of the Academy in Vienna, despite exhibiting there. Nevertheless his work was highly regarded, and the Imperial Chancellor Wenzel Anton, Prince of Kaunitz-Rietberg was a patron. His painting Hebe (1795) was a sensation for its lighting effects, and bought by Emperor Francis II for a large amount. He was also made a Royal and Imperial Court Painter. Unfortunately, he only benefited from this role for two years before heart failure lead to his death on 4 December 1797, leaving a widow and nine children.
