= Pietro Alemanno =

Italian-Austrian painter

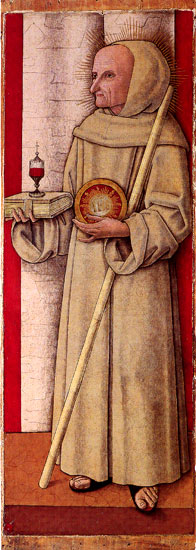
Pietro Alemanno, St. James of the Marches, fresco

Pietro Alemanno (c. 1430 – 1497 or 1498) was an Italian-Austrian painter of the Renaissance period.

He was born in Göttweig (Austria) and died in Ascoli Piceno. He trained with Carlo Crivelli.

In 1484, Alemanno painted a fresco of the Annunciation for the Palazzo Communale in Ascoli, in which he shows the figures in front of an elaborate architectural setting. In 1489 he painted an altarpiece of Virgin and Child between SS. Michael, Biaise, Jerome, and Nicholas for the church of Santa Maria della Carita. There are a number of his works in the Pinacoteca Civica Fortunato Duranti.

== Gallery ==
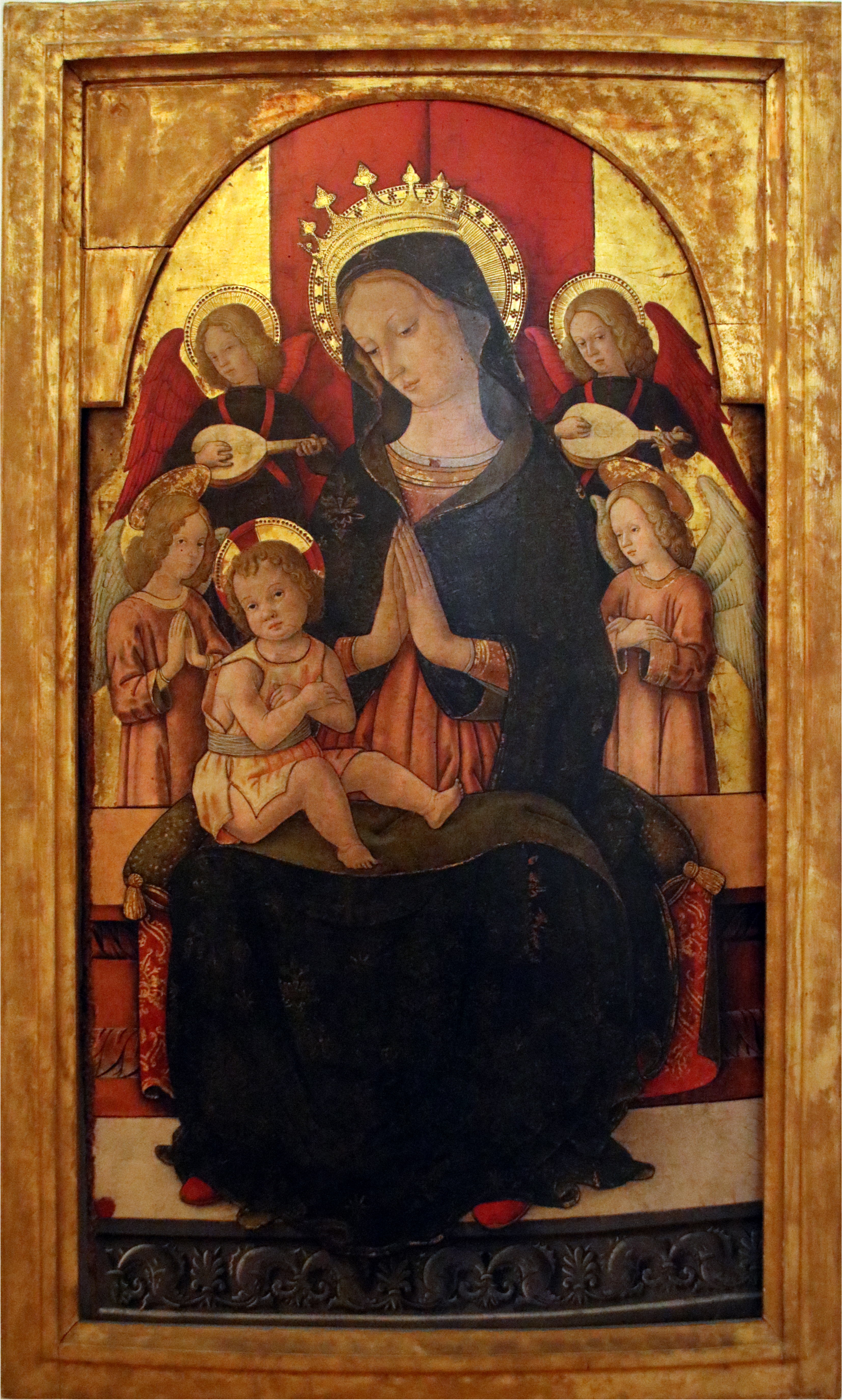
Madonna with Child and Angels

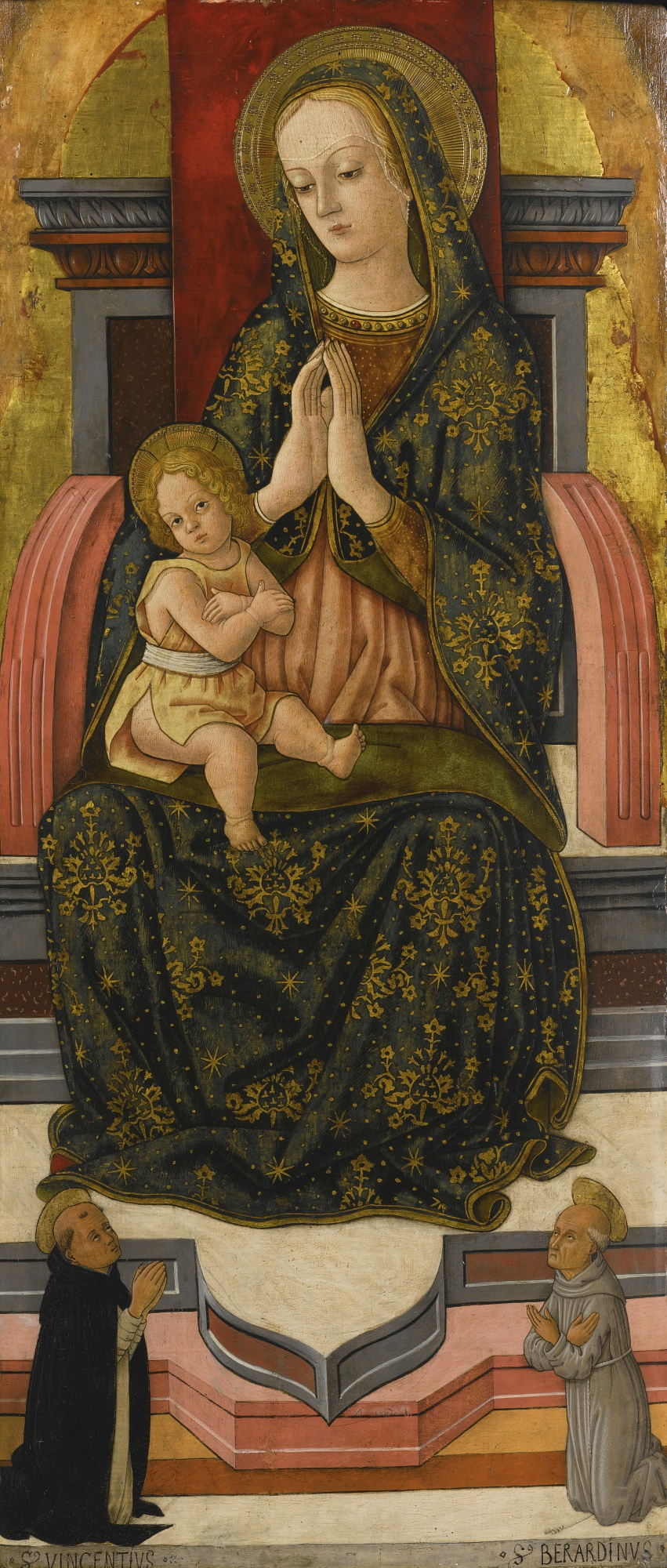
Madonna and Child Enthroned

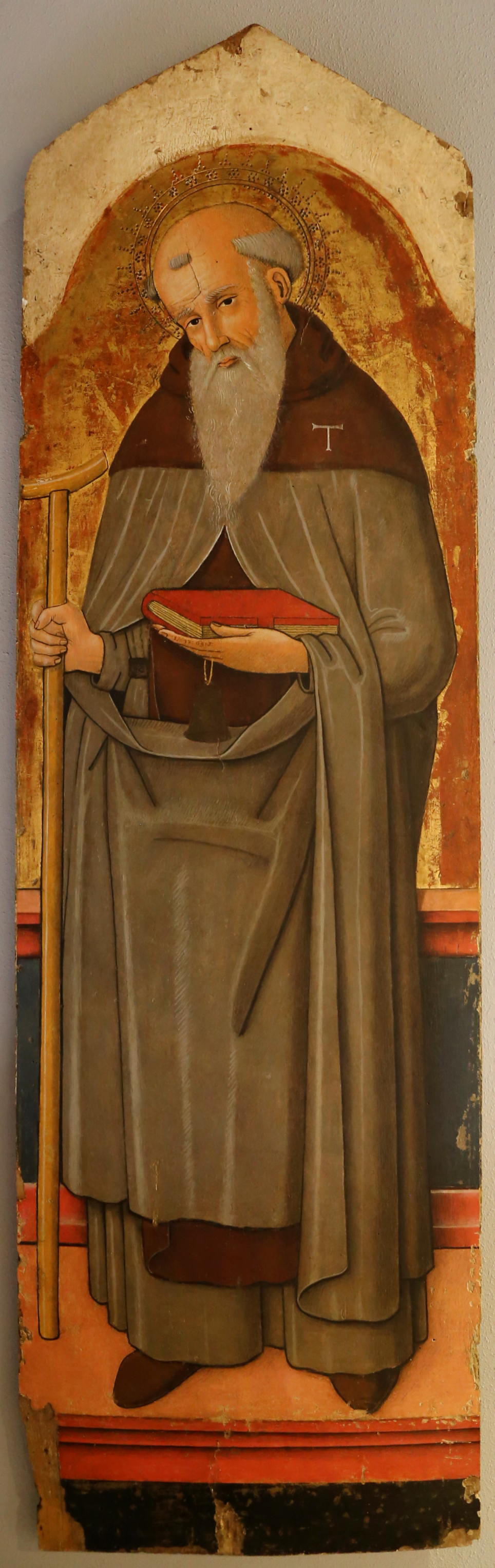
Anthony the Abbot

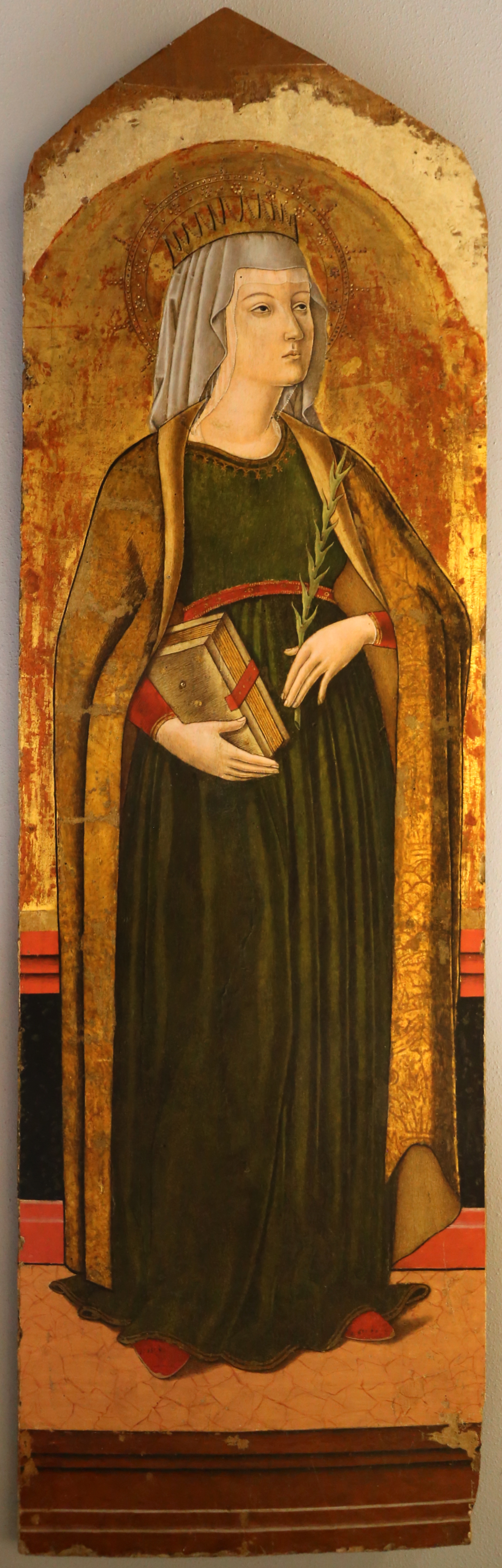
Saint Rufina

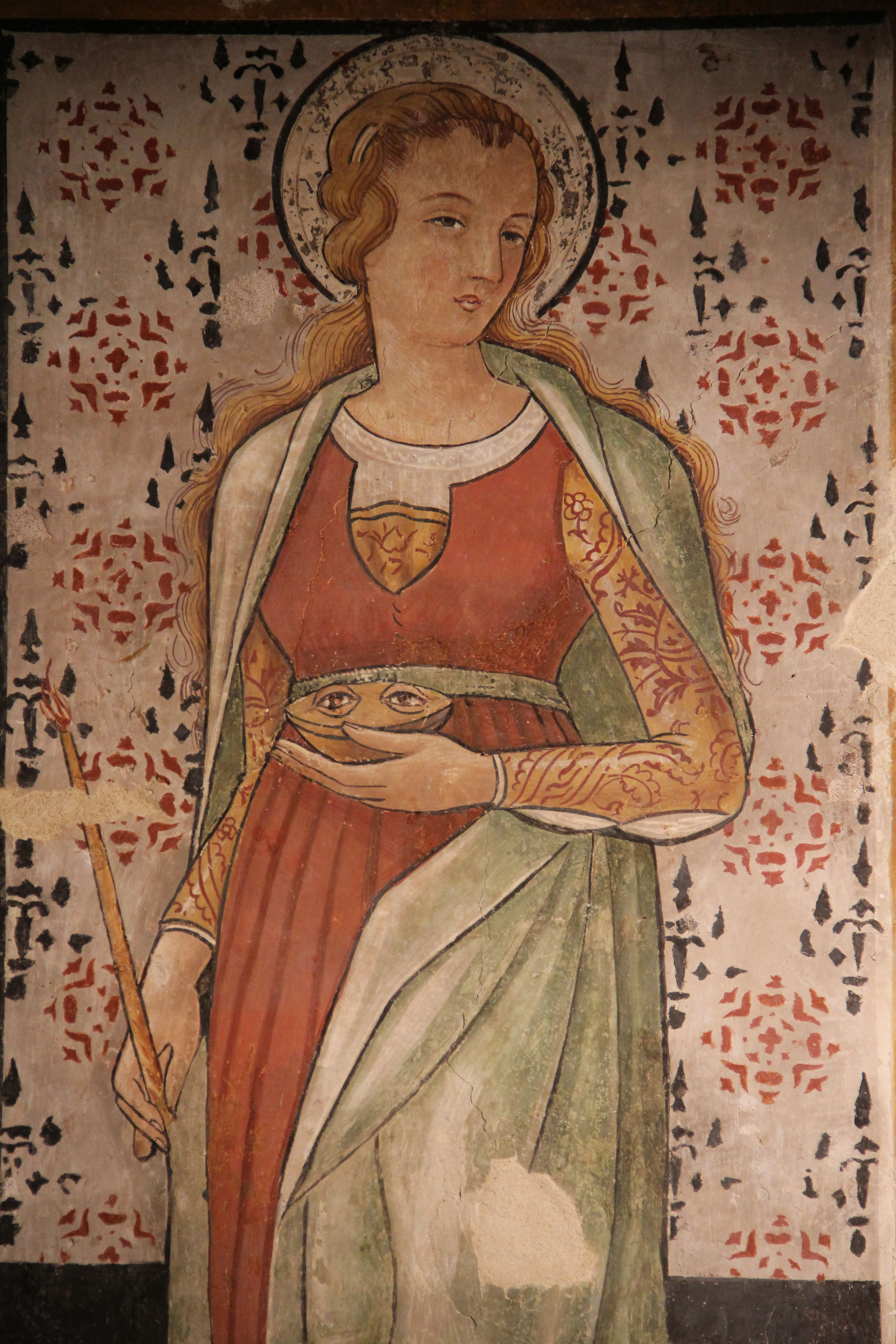
Saint Lucia

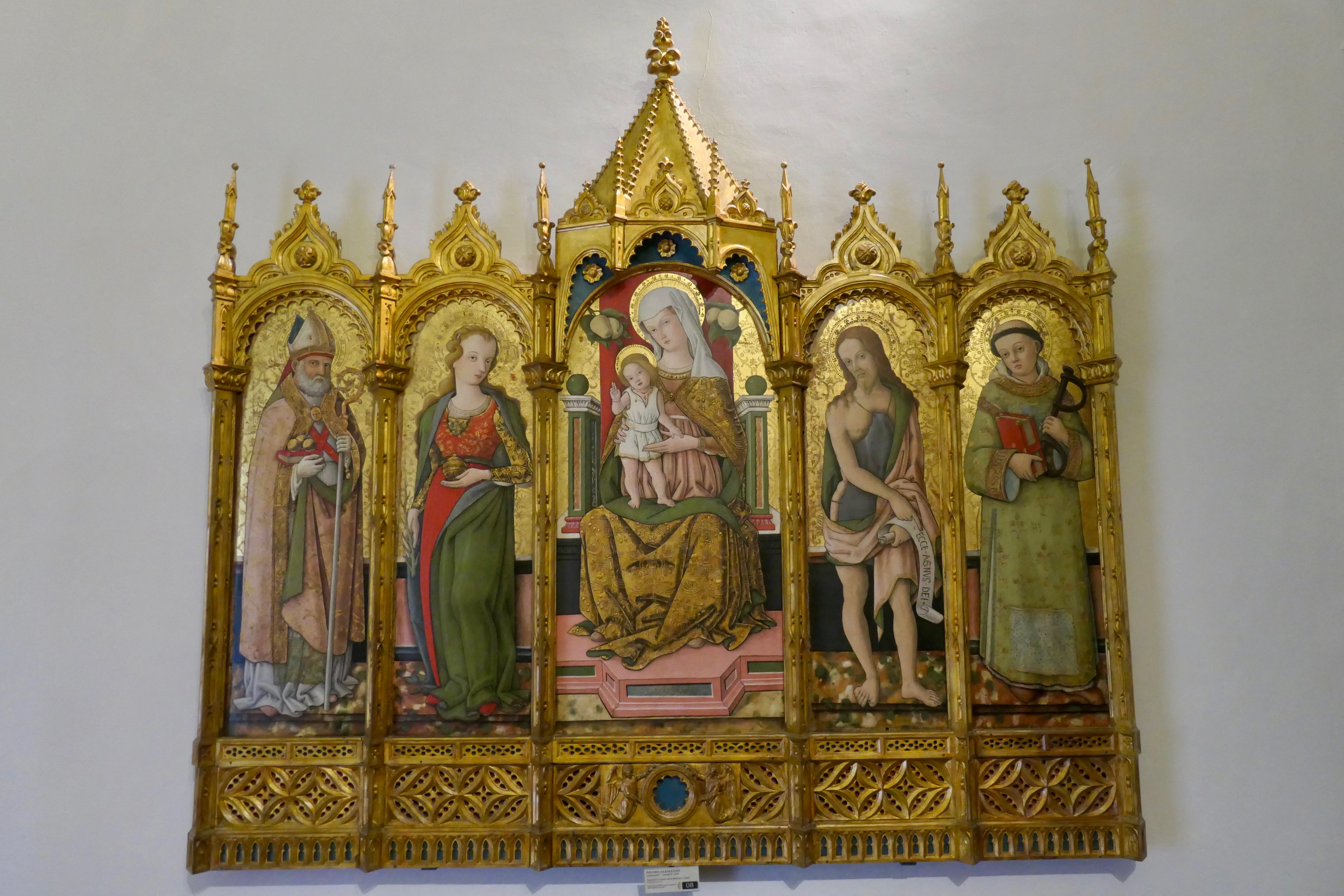
Polyptych in the Church of Santa Maria della Carità, 1489

== Sources ==
- Bryan, Michael (1886). Robert Edmund Graves (ed.). Dictionary of Painters and Engravers, Biographical and Critical. Vol. I A-K. London: George Bell and Sons. p. 17.
