= Giuseppe Turchi (painter, born 1759) =

Italian painter (1759–1799)

Giuseppe Turchi (19 June 1759 in Savignano di Romagna, Emilia-Romagna – 25 January 1799) was an Italian painter of the Neoclassical period.

After his father died, he abandoned the study of the trade in pharmacy. He initially trained with a painter named Soleri in Ferrara, but then was called by his brother to Rome, where he worked in the studio of Christopher Unterberger for ten years. He moved to Parma in 1790. He also traveled to Dresden, but returned to Parma in a project to reproduce the works of Correggio in the church of San Giovanni Evangelista. Here he met professor Francesco Malaspina.

He was known for his portraits, including those of: General Miller; M. Vesteren, a British parliamentarian; Captain Dales of England; Cadetto Potoski; General Demester of Turin; the French Viceroy Eugène de Beauharnais; Madame Letizia; Paolina Borghese, Christopher Columbus; and Pietro Perugino commissioned by Antonio Canova; George Washington; Benjamin Franklin; Napoleon; Monument of the Margrave of Anspach; Monument of Storer (English); and Lord Sasbourn.

A later painter by the same name (1840-1895) was born in Sezze in Lazio.
