= Giuseppe Turchi (painter, born 1840) =

Italian painter (1840–1895)

Giuseppe Turchi (1840 – 2 July 1895) was an Italian painter.

== Biography ==
He was born in Sezze Romano in the province of Latina in the Lazio. He trained in Rome at the Accademia di San Luca, graduating in 1860, when he returned to Sezze. In 1861, he painted large canvases for the Abbess of the Monastery of Santa Chiara di Sezze. He painted the halls of the Antiquarium, and of private rooms on via Tirletti, and for the Palazzo Rappini on via Umberto (destroyed by World War II bombardment). He also painted salons in the Palazzo of the La Penna family in vicolo del Serpe. In 1876, he moved to Rome, where he met the ambassador to Thailand, and was recruited to paint frescoes for the royal palace of Bangkok. He died in Singapore.

A Neoclassical painter by the same name (1759–1788) was born in Savignano sul Rubicone, Emilia-Romagna.
