= Michelangelo Unterberger =

South painter (1695–1758)

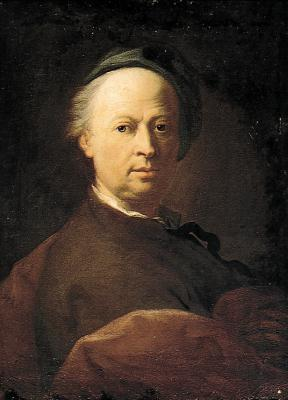
Self-portrait (c.1750)

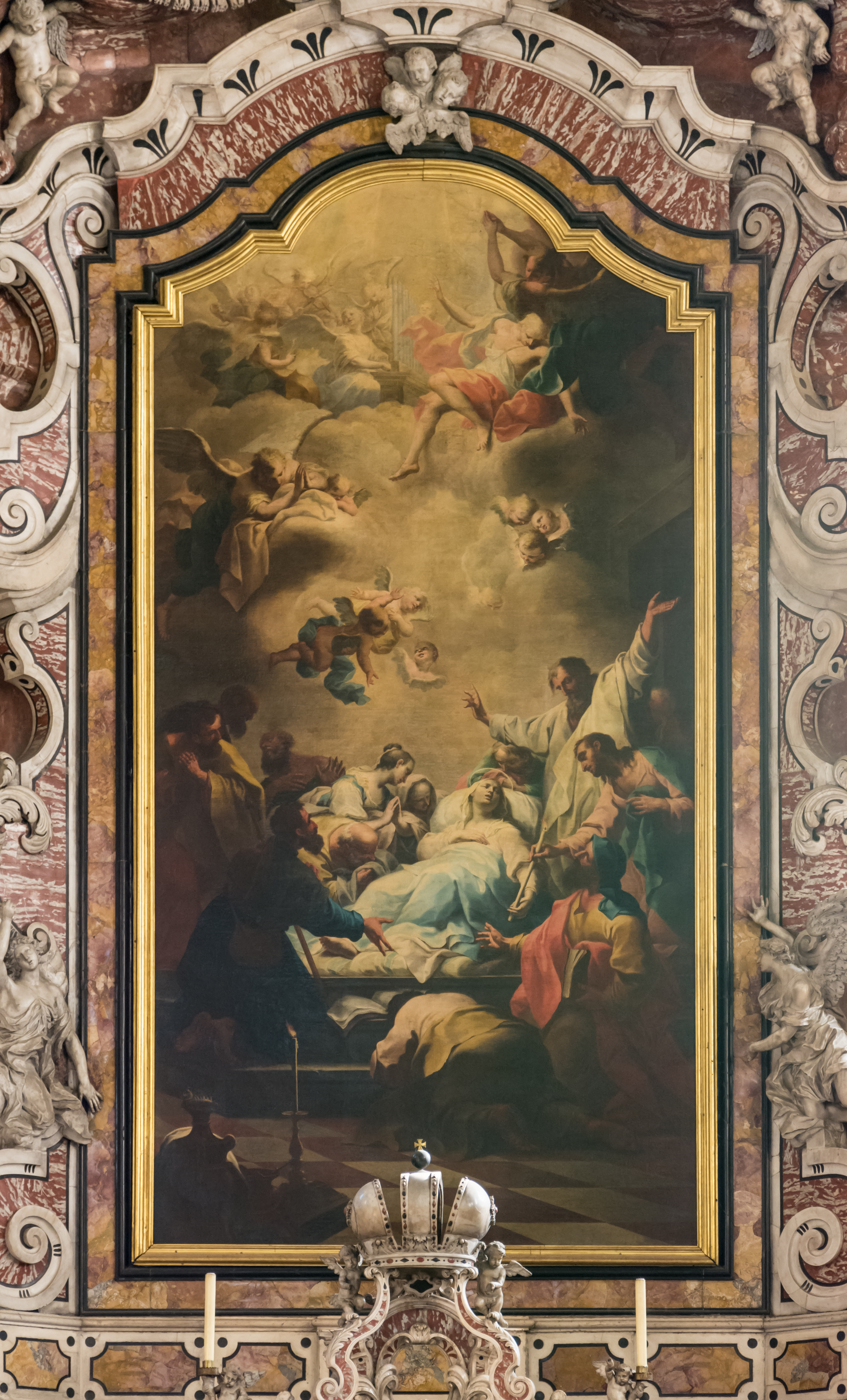
Saint Mary's Death in the Presence of the Apostles at Brixen Cathedral

Michelangelo Unterberger, also Michael Angelo Unterberger and Michelangelo Unterperger (11 August 1695 – 27 June 1758) was a South Tyrolean painter in the Baroque style.

== Life ==
He was born in Cavalese then within the Prince-Bishopric of Trent, as the son of a forest warden. His first studies were with Giuseppe Alberti in Cavalese. He completed his training with a study trip to Venice, where he worked with Nicola Grassi. After that, he moved to Bolzano, where he painted a version of "The Judgment of Solomon" in the town hall and became a citizen in 1726.

In the years around 1730, he worked at various monasteries and churches in Passau and the lower Inn valley as an altar painter. His paintings include a "Baptism of Christ" at Vornbach Abbey and two versions of the "Holy Family" at the chapel in Schärding and the parish church in St. Florian am Inn. Several works from this period have been lost.

In 1737, he settled permanently in Vienna, establishing himself as one of the city's leading altar painters, receiving a number of commissions from the Imperial Court. From 1751 to 1754 and again from 1757 to 1758, he was the Rector of the "Imperial and Royal Court Academy of painters, sculptors and architecture" (now the Academy of Fine Arts Vienna). The title "Rector Magnificus" was originally bestowed upon him in 1751 by the Empress Maria Theresa.

Some of his best-known works in Vienna are at St. Michael's Church and the dome in St. Stephen's Cathedral. Often cited as his finest work is his depiction of Saint Mary's death at Brixen Cathedral. Upon his death in 1758 in Vienna, his valuable collection of paintings and drawings was bequeathed to his younger brother Franz, who was also a well-known painter.

In 1899, a street in Vienna's Brigittenau district was named after him.
