= Torregrotta railway station =

Italian railway station

Torregrotta
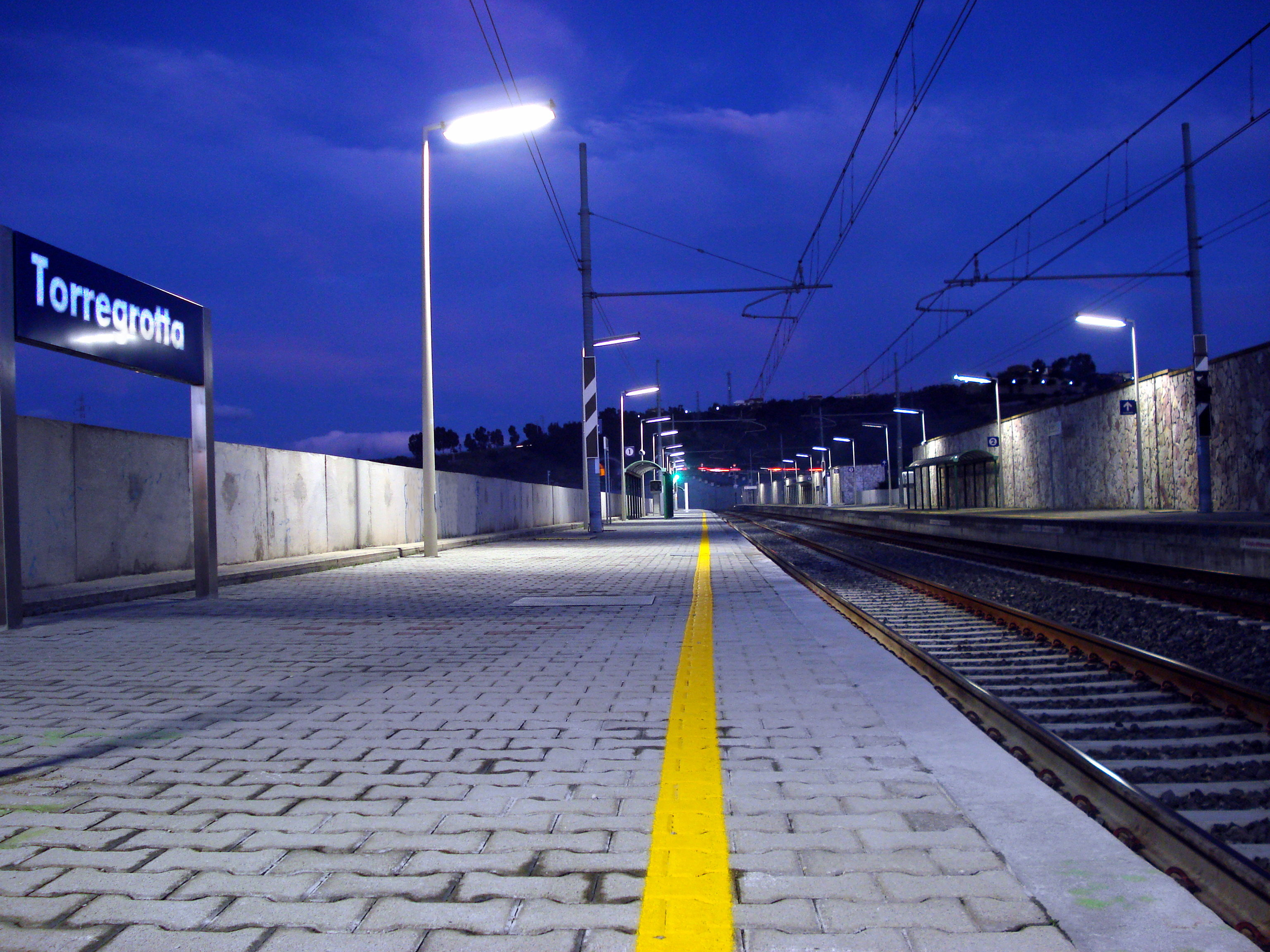
- Night view of the station

General information
- Location: Viale Europa; Torregrotta, Sicily; Italy
- Coordinates: 38°12′24″N 15°21′06″E
- Owner: Rete Ferroviaria Italiana
- Operator: Rete Ferroviaria Italiana
- Line: Palermo–Messina
- Distance: 200.561 km (124.623 mi) from Palermo Centrale
- Platforms: 2
- Train operators: Trenitalia
- Connections: buses

Other information
- Classification: Bronze

History
- Opened: 23 November 2009; 16 years ago
Location
- Location within Sicily Location within Italy

Torregrotta railway station is a railway station serving the small town of Torregrotta, in the north-east of Sicily, Italy. The station also serves nearby villages including Monforte San Giorgio, Roccavaldina and Valdina. It is located on the Palermo–Messina railway and all trains calling there are operated by Trenitalia. The current station, opened on 23 November 2009, replaces an earlier one dating from the early years of the twentieth century and closed on 9 August 2009.

== History ==
The section between Messina and San Filippo of the Palermo-Messina Railway was opened on 20 June 1889 but no passenger facilities were provided at Torregrotta until the early years of the twentieth century. The first station was originally opened as Scala and later renamed as Roccavaldina - Scala - Torregrotta. It was equipped with an important goods station where a large amount of agricultural products came from surrounding crops. The works for the construction of a new station were contracted in 1999 and began in 2000. On 9 August 2009 the first station was closed and on 23 November 2009 the new station was opened as Torregrotta.

== Services ==
The typical weekday service from the station is thirty-five trains per day. On Sundays the service is reduced to nine trains.

== See also ==
- Berlin–Palermo railway axis
- List of railway stations in Sicily
- Railway stations in Italy
- Rail transport in Italy
- History of rail transport in Italy
- History of Torregrotta

== Bibliography ==
- Coco, Angelo; De Leo, Nino; Di Stefano, Pietro; Pandolfo, Pippo (1993). Torregrotta, una storia ricostruita (in Italian). Messina: EDAS edition. ISBN 88-7820-080-8.
- Di Vita, Giuseppe (1906). Dizionario geografico dei comuni della Sicilia e delle frazioni comunali: con notizie storiche (in Italian). Palermo: F. Pravatà edition.
