= Torregrotta =

Comune in Sicily, Italy

Torregrotta Τορρεγκρόττα (Greek)
- Comune
- Comune di Torregrotta
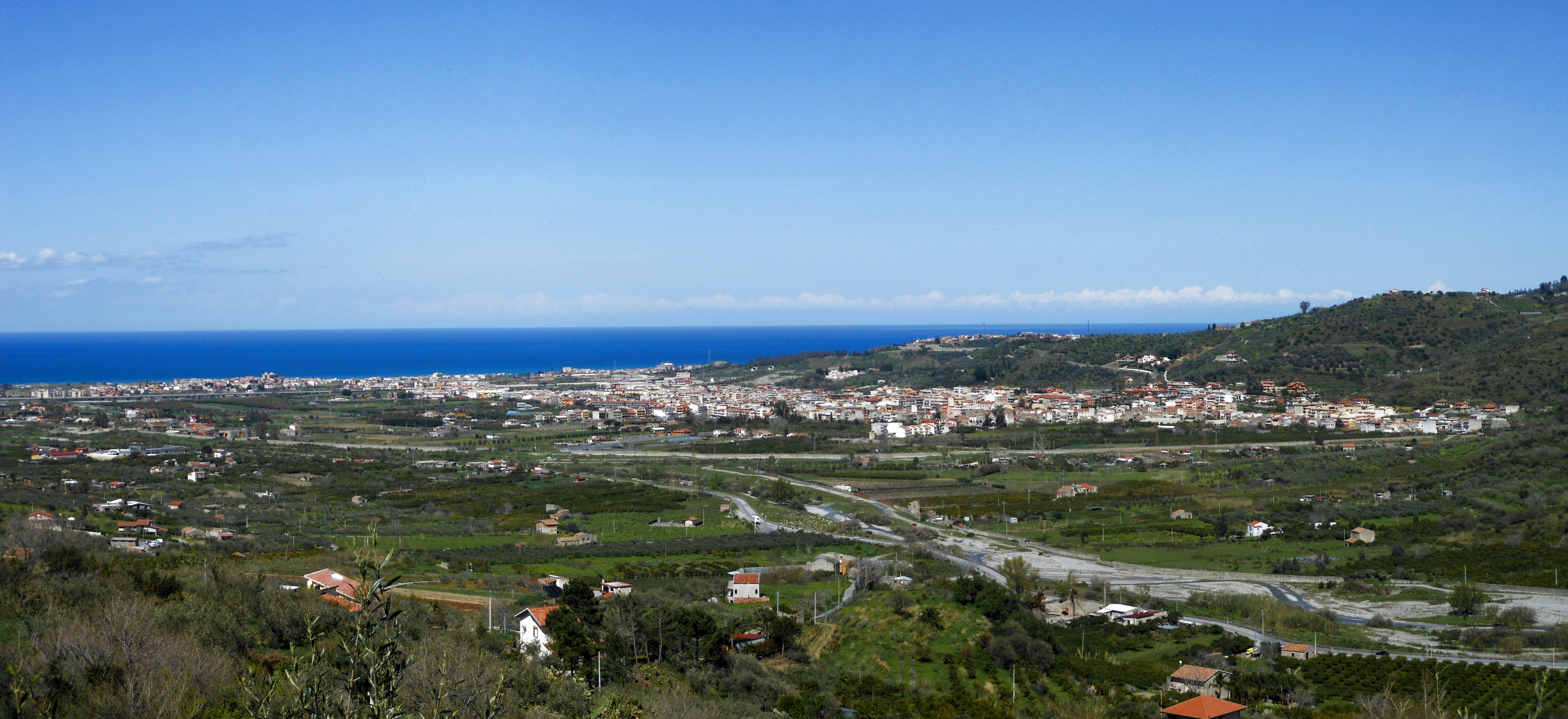

- Coat of arms

- Location within Italy Location within Sicily
- Coordinates: 38°12′N 15°21′E
- Country: Italy
- Region: Sicily
- Metropolitan city: Messina (ME)
- Founded: October 21, 1923

Government
  - Mayor: Antonino Caselli (civic list) since 13-10-2021

Area
  - Total: 4.13 km^{2} (1.59 sq mi)
- Elevation: 44 m (144 ft)

Population (31 December 2023)
  - Total: 7,297
  - Density: 1,770/km^{2} (4,580/sq mi)
- Demonym: Torresi
- Time zone: UTC+1 (CET)
  - Summer (DST): UTC+2 (CEST)
- Postal code: 98040
- Dialing code: 090
- Patron saint: Saint Paulinus of Nola
- Saint day: June 22nd
- Website: Official website

Torregrotta (IPA: [tɔrre'grɔtta]; Turri in Sicilian) is an Italian town of 7,297 inhabitants in the metropolitan city of Messina in Sicily.

The town, located 44 meters above sea level in the Niceto valley, lies between the Tyrrhenian Sea and the first Peloritani hills.

Initially built in medieval times as a hamlet of the fief of Santa Maria della Scala, after a period of abandonment, it was rebuilt starting in 1526. At the beginning of the 19th century it became a sub-municipality of Roccavaldina, from which it obtained administrative autonomy in 1923. The 16th-century center expanded mainly from the second half of the 19th century onward.

A center historically linked to agriculture, the place of origin of the sbergia, it has lost its traditional agricultural role in favor of the tertiary sector. The clay extraction and processing industry had a certain boost in the 20th century, but almost completely ceased to exist in the 2000s. Medium and small artisan businesses predominate.

== Physical geography ==
=== Territory ===
The territory of Torregrotta is located along the northern coast of Sicily, in the Niceto valley, and extends south towards the foothills of the Peloritani Mountains. With an area of 4.13 km², it is the second smallest municipality in the valley, preceded only by Valdina (2.60 km²), and one of the smallest in the metropolitan city of Messina. Its natural boundaries are the Caracciolo (east), Sottocatena (south), Bagheria (south-west), Lavina (west) and Tyrrhenian Sea (north) streams; it also borders the following municipalities: Valdina to the east, Roccavaldina to the south, Monforte San Giorgio to the south and to the west. The administrative boundaries form a quadrilateral of approximately rectangular shape, measuring 3700 meters in latitude and 1150 meters in longitude.

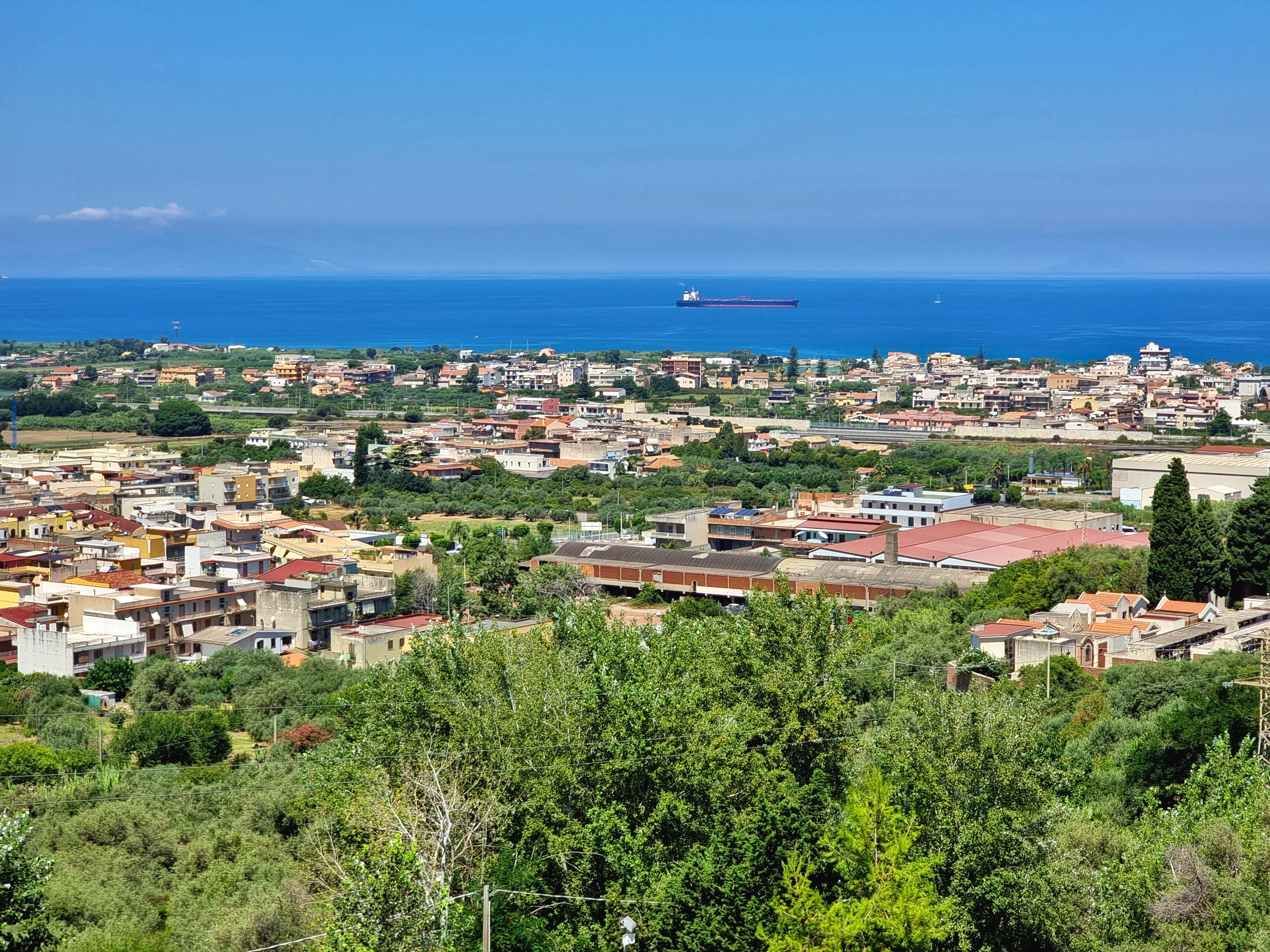
Panoramic view of Torregrotta

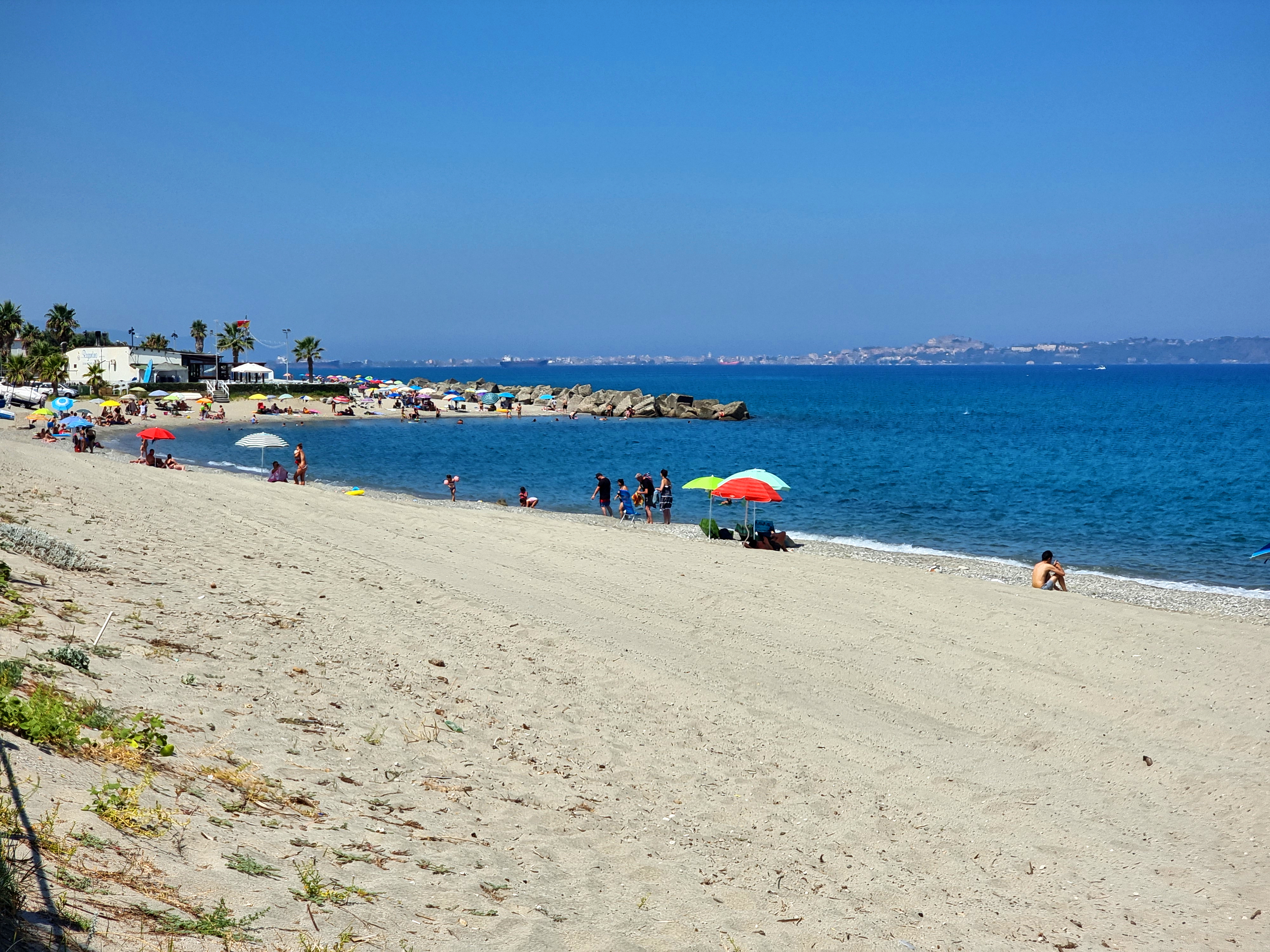
A stretch of Torregrotta's coastline

Most of the land in Torregrotta, about 70%, is morphologically flat, with slopes that do not exceed 5%. The plain, in addition to the coastal strip, extends inland as far as the Bagheria stream and constitutes the easternmost portion of the valley through which the Niceto river flows. The hilly area, bordered to the east by the valley and to the west by the Caracciolo stream, is instead formed by the ridge that slopes down towards the coast and, in the central-northern sector, is characterized by several clay quarries that for a long time were used by the brick industry. The coastline extends for about 1200 meters and has low, sandy beaches of varying appearance and extension over time.

The city extends across the plain, mainly in a latitudinal direction and without interruption, from the coast to the southern border, and transversally near the SS 113 highway. The altitude of the town, between 3 and 50 meters above sea level, is officially indicated as 44 meters above sea level because the town hall is at that altitude. The altitude range of the entire territory of Torregrotta varies from sea level to the highest hilltop, to the south-east of the town, at an altitude of 193 meters above sea level.

==== Hydrography ====
The valley in which Torregrotta is located is part of the Niceto river basin which is considered one of the main waterways of the Peloritani mountains for its historical and naturalistic value. However, the Niceto does not cross the municipal territory, flowing just beyond the western administrative border, a short distance from the town. To the east, beyond the hilly area, the soil is crossed by the Caracciolo stream which, throughout its course, only 4.9 km long, separates Torregrotta from the municipality of Valdina flowing into the Tyrrhenian Sea, and whose basin partly includes the territory of Torregrotta.

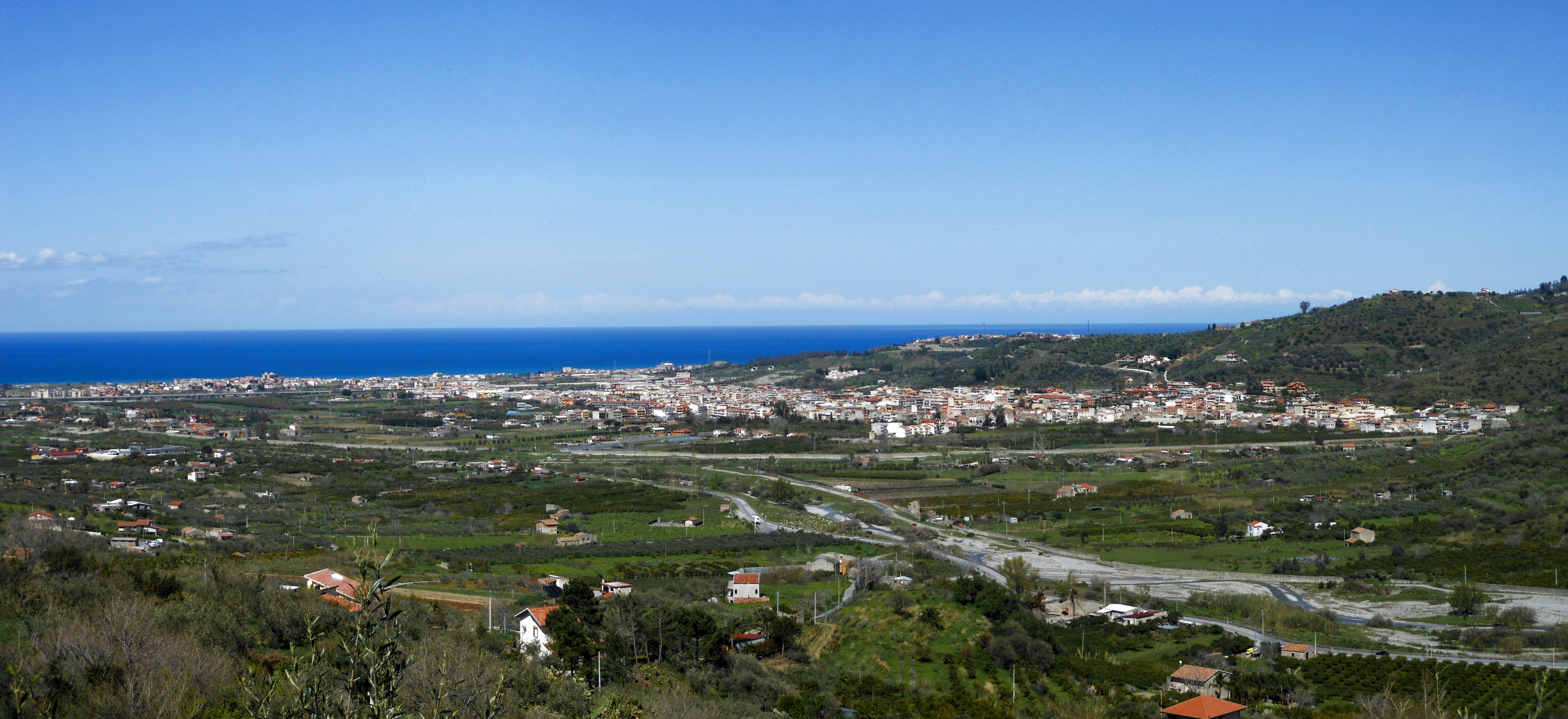
Panorama of the city and the Niceto valley. In the foreground, the Niceto stream at the confluence of the Bagheria stream

In addition to the Caracciolo, there are several minor waterways that flow through the municipal area, including the Bagheria, the main tributary of the Niceto and the territorial boundary with the municipality of Monforte San Giorgio for about 600 meters. Tributaries of the Bagheria are the Sottocatena stream, which marks part of the border with the municipality of Roccavaldina, and the Granatara stream that flows near the Grotta district. All the aforementioned minor water bodies can be dry for most of the year as they are temporary streams depending on rainfall. The Bagheria stream is an exception, which thanks to a complex drainage basin has a semi-permanent torrential hydrological regime, typical of rivers, with floods in the winter season and periods of low water or drought in the summer season.

Torregrotta's major water resources are concentrated in the underground aquifers from which they are extracted through wells and drills to supply the municipal aqueduct and for the irrigation of agricultural fields. The aquifer, which is directly fed by rainwater and water that has infiltrated down from the mountains, is characterized by the changing height of the average water level, which varies according to the local properties of the terrain, and can be found just below the surface or reach depths of several tens of meters. Furthermore, the aquifer system is isolated at the bottom by a layer of impermeable material composed of gray-blue clay. In summer, during the dry period of the streams, the groundwater rises spontaneously from the ground, forming several natural springs near the coast; in fact, as demonstrated by some studies, the rainfall that enriches the catchment basins, infiltrating the soil during the rainy season (September - February), takes about six months to reach the coastal plain. The phenomenon was known since Roman times, as told by Pliny the Elder:

In Sicily, between Messina and Milazzo, the springs completely dry up in winter, while in summer they overflow and create a stream.

— Pliny the Elder, Naturalis Historia, XXXI, 28

One of the springs is the source of the Lavina, a small stream that flows near the coast on the border with the municipality of Monforte San Giorgio. At the end of the 19th century, during the reclamation of the coastal area, most of the springs were channeled with ditches called saie, near which, until the last century, the folkloric rite of washing wool was carried out, which would then be used to make mattresses and household cushions.

==== Geology ====
The entire town is built on a layer of Holocene alluvial deposits (recent floods) consisting of clastic sediments, in particular sands, often silty, with gravel and pebbles from metamorphic rocks inside. Their formation is the result of the erosive action of present-day watercourses, which over time have transported and deposited downstream fragments of rock eroded in the mountains by exogenous agents. Recent floods have covered the entire flat area, with a variable thickness that can exceed even 30 meters. The topmost layer, about 1 meter thick, is made up of agricultural soil rich in humus, organic material and nutrients.

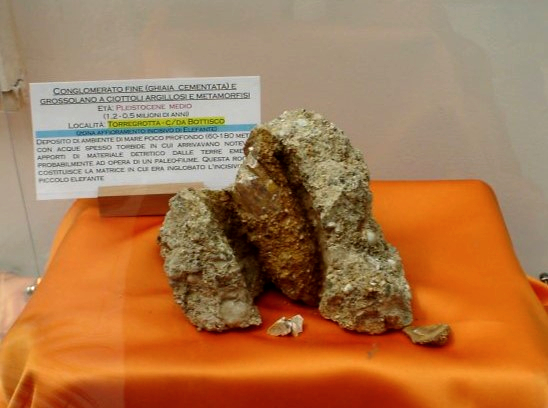
The fossilized fragment of a dwarf elephant tusk found in Torregrotta in the silty layers of the Bottisco district clays

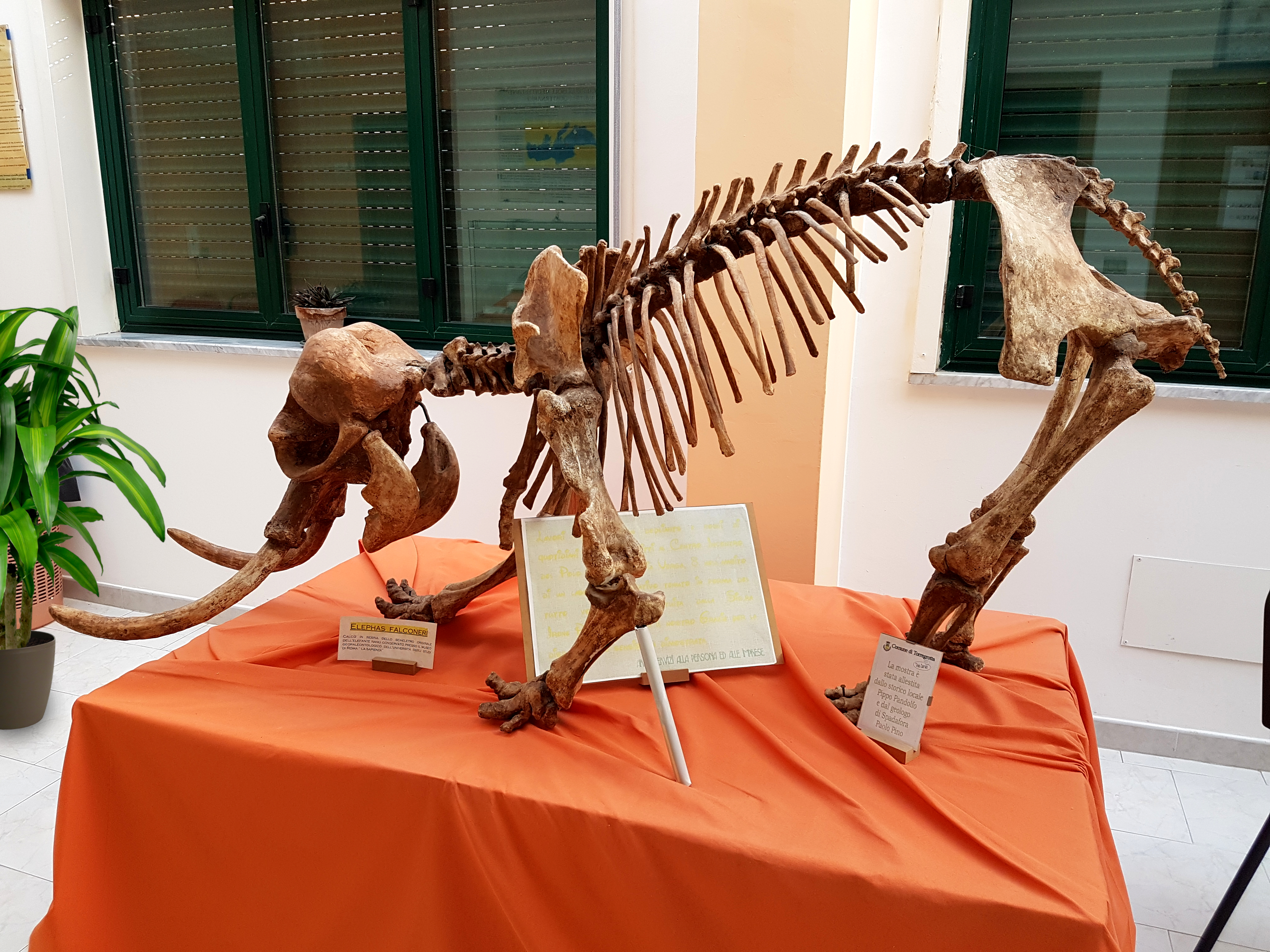
Dwarf elephant cast on display in the permanent geopaleontological exhibition of the Peloritani area set up at the Polo Servizi

The eastern part of the territory of Torregrotta is dominated by compact layers of blue-gray clay, sometimes more than 100 meters deep, with silty layers in between. After the recent floods, these are the most common formation on the surface and are suitable for the production of bricks thanks to the good characteristics of the material. In 2001, during a geological survey of the clays in the Bottisco district, a fossil fragment of a dwarf elephant tusk was found, dating from the Middle Pleistocene.

In the hilly areas of the Maddalena district, alongside the clays, there are outcrops of calcarenites and organogenic sands with a yellowish-gray color that have cross-bedding and variable consistency. They also contain nannoflora and planktonic foraminifera. Clays and organogenic formations form the substrate for recent alluvial deposits and on the top of the hills they are intersected by marine terraces composed of silt, gravel and other aggregates of crystalline origin.

In the southern part of the municipal territory, various geological formations emerge on the surface: close to the banks of the Caracciolo stream, there is a strip of rock formations composed of marly limestone and calcareous marl whose peculiar characteristic is the high number of cracks generally filled with pelite. A short distance from the Grotta district, on the other hand, there are formations of whitish evaporitic limestone that rest on stratifications of sediments in which medium-sized sandstone rocks alternate, sometimes dissolving into sands, and layers of clay. The deepest geological formation, overlying all the previous ones, is represented by the metamorphic rocks of the Aspromonte unit dominated by paragneiss. The riverbeds and beaches are formed by current floods, that is to say materials transported and deposited by the waters of the rivers or by the waves of the sea. In the first case these are sediments formed by gravel and sand with pebbles and fragments of rock of different sizes; in the second case they are sandy deposits.

The most recent geological formations are the screes that can be found in a limited portion of the hillside and are made up of sandy and silty materials. In summary, the stratigraphy of the subsoil in Torregrotta includes the following succession of geological structures:

- Scree
- Recent alluvial deposits (Holocene)
- Recent alluvial deposits (Holocene)
- Marine terraces (Middle-Upper Pleistocene)
- Blue-gray clays (Upper Pliocene - Middle Pleistocene)
- Calcarenites and organogenic sands (Upper Pliocene - Middle Pleistocene)
- Trubi (Lower Pliocene)
- Evaporitic limestone (Messinian)
- Sandy-arenaceous-pebble alternation (Tortonian)
- Metamorphic rocks - Aspromonte Unit (Hercynian)

From a tectonic point of view, the area where Torregrotta is located went through an initial phase of orogenic movements of the lower formations and, starting from the Miocene, a process of land uplift as witnessed by the marine terraces present on the hills. This led to the activation of erosive phenomena and the creation of extensional faults of which, however, there is no historical evidence of movement. The main earthquakes that have affected the city have always originated from the seismogenic sources of the Calabro-Peloritano Arc. According to the seismic classification of the Italian national territory, Torregrotta is classified as follows:

- Zone 2 (medium seismicity), Prime Ministerial Decree no. 3274 of 20/03/2003

=== Climate ===
Torregrotta has a typical warm temperate climate that alternates hot summers winters that are not excessively cold, with mild and comfortable intermediate seasons. According to long-term surveys by the local meteorological station, the average annual temperature is around 18.0 °C; the coldest month is February, with an average temperature of 11.1 °C, and the hottest month is August, with an average temperature of 25.9 °C. In summer the temperature can exceed 40 °C, but in rare cases, and in winter it almost never drops below 0 °C. Seasonal temperature variations are moderate, ranging between 6 °C and 8 °C. In Torregrotta, annual rainfall averages 946.3 mm and rarely turns into heavy rain or snowfall, the last of which occurred on January 31, 1999 and, to a lesser extent, on December 31, 2014. The rainy season is between fall and the first part of spring; however, rainfall is irregular both in annual quantity and daily distribution, often characterized by high accumulations in a short period of time. Only 25-30% of the total annual rainfall falls in late spring and summer, which is the driest season. Torregrotta is often characterized by windy days during the calendar year. The mistral is the most frequent wind and in its most intense phases it is accompanied by violent sea storms. The libeccio and scirocco winds are also periodic.

Climate data for Torregrotta (2003–2022)
Month	Jan	Feb	Mar	Apr	May	Jun	Jul	Aug	Sep	Oct	Nov	Dec	Year
Record high °C (°F)	26.2 (79.2)	29.2 (84.6)	30.9 (87.6)	34.2 (93.6)	39.3 (102.7)	44.5 (112.1)	42.7 (108.9)	41.8 (107.2)	38.4 (101.1)	35.5 (95.9)	30.0 (86.0)	30.2 (86.4)	44.5 (112.1)
Mean daily maximum °C (°F)	15.6 (60.1)	15.7 (60.3)	17.4 (63.3)	20.7 (69.3)	24.3 (75.7)	28.5 (83.3)	31.0 (87.8)	31.4 (88.5)	28.4 (83.1)	25.1 (77.2)	20.9 (69.6)	17.2 (63.0)	23.0 (73.4)
Daily mean °C (°F)	11.3 (52.3)	11.1 (52.0)	12.6 (54.7)	15.5 (59.9)	18.8 (65.8)	22.8 (73.0)	25.5 (77.9)	25.9 (78.6)	23.3 (73.9)	20.0 (68.0)	16.2 (61.2)	13.0 (55.4)	18.0 (64.4)
Mean daily minimum °C (°F)	7.1 (44.8)	6.6 (43.9)	7.7 (45.9)	10.2 (50.4)	13.3 (55.9)	17.2 (63.0)	19.9 (67.8)	20.5 (68.9)	18.1 (64.6)	15.0 (59.0)	11.5 (52.7)	8.7 (47.7)	13.0 (55.4)
Record low °C (°F)	0.4 (32.7)	0.5 (32.9)	1.3 (34.3)	4.1 (39.4)	7.6 (45.7)	10.7 (51.3)	15.9 (60.6)	15.4 (59.7)	10.5 (50.9)	8.2 (46.8)	3.2 (37.8)	0.1 (32.2)	0.1 (32.2)
Average precipitation mm (inches)	111.1 (4.37)	102.1 (4.02)	87.3 (3.44)	53.8 (2.12)	29.6 (1.17)	26.5 (1.04)	16.8 (0.66)	35.8 (1.41)	87.0 (3.43)	106.5 (4.19)	162.8 (6.41)	127.0 (5.00)	946.3 (37.26)
Average relative humidity (%)	71.8	73.6	69.4	66.3	65.0	63.4	62.1	63.5	68.6	73.0	74.1	72.6	68.6

The Torregrotta weather station has been active since January 1, 2002 and is part of the SIAS network of the Sicilian Region and the SCIA SINAnet national network managed by ISPRA. According to the climatic classification of Italian municipalities, Torregrotta is classified as follows:

- Climate zone: B;
- Degree days: 702.

== Origin of the name ==
Historians agree that the toponym Torregrotta is a combination of the words Torre (tower) and Grotta (cave), the two adjacent districts that form the historic center of the city. The origin of both terms can be traced back to the presence of two structures in the area, i.e. at least two towers (one of which is still present in Via Trieste) and several caves. What was initially the Hamlet of the Feud of Santa Maria della Scala (1526) took on the name Torre in the first half of the 19th century, as can be seen in two deeds dated 1815 and 1817. The adjacent district of Grotta, on the other hand, already existed in the 16th century, as attested by a notarial deed dated 1585. The town acquired its current name around the middle of the 19th century; in fact, the first official documents in which the two words appear for the first time together in the place name Torre Grotta are the Dizionario Topografico della Sicilia (Topographical Dictionary of Sicily) by V. Amico from 1855 and a notarial deed dated October 13, 1857.

== History ==
=== Ancient history ===
The absence of archaeological finds has not made it possible to clarify whether there was a permanent human settlement in the territory of Torregrotta during ancient history. The most likely hypothesis among historians is that the area was initially inhabited by the Sicani and that the fertility of the soil, together with the abundance of water provided by the Niceto, favored human settlement in the Hellenic period with the formation of farming villages. Later, in Roman times, the presence of at least one small town is considered highly probable because large estates were created and administered by a tribune or, according to a more recent theory, by some rich Romans.

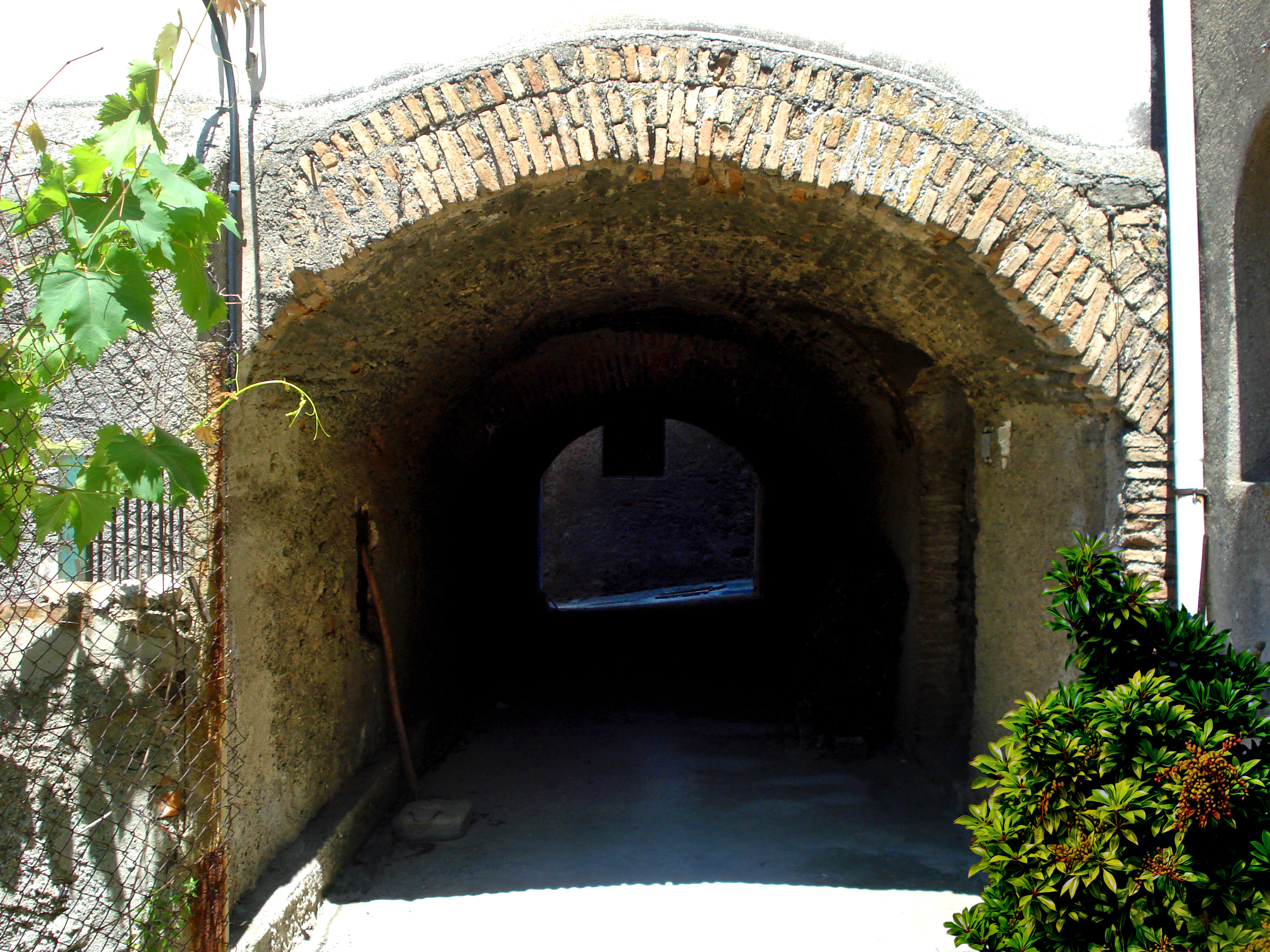
View of the historic center: the pedestrian tunnel in Vico Cesare Battisti

=== Middle Ages ===
After the fall of the Roman Empire, the area around Torregrotta was occupied first by the Ostrogoths and then by the Byzantines, who renamed it Casale del Conte. The Casale was a small agricultural center razed to the ground by the Saracens around the year 870. The Arabs preferred to settle in what is today the Radali district and during their domination, which lasted until the Norman conquest of 1061, the territory of Torregrotta was called Rachal Elmelum. In March 1168, the Norman King William II and his mother, Margaret of Navarre, donated the ancient Byzantine hamlet to the Benedictine monastery of Santa Maria della Scala in Messina, creating the territorial entity that would go down in history as the fief of Santa Maria della Scala. The latter included almost all of the territory of Torregrotta and part of that of Valdina. The concession was reconfirmed by Henry VI and Constance I, and then twice more, in 1209 and 1221, by the Swabian emperor Frederick II. During the reign of the latter, the fief was usurped by the judge of Messina, Afranione de Porta, and later by other citizens of Messina, and only returned to the possession of the monastery in 1289 by virtue of a sentence issued by the papal legate of Sicily in 1267. Starting from the plague wave of 1347, the hamlet of the feud of Santa Maria della Scala gradually began to depopulate, remaining abandoned until the 16th century. Meanwhile, in the 14th century, the Rocca feud (today Roccavaldina) had been created by the King of Sicily, Frederick III, which, incorporating the portion of land belonging to the town of Torre del Greco that until then had been included in the royal state property, had joined the Scala feud in the administration of the present territory.

=== Modern Age ===
In 1526, Emperor Charles V issued a Licentia populandi authorizing the rebuilding and repopulation of the ancient Casale whose sixteenth-century nucleus grew and developed over the centuries, first being called Torre and then Torregrotta, representing the origin of the present-day city. The rebirth of the hamlet marked the economic recovery of the entire fief of Santa Maria della Scala, whose management was entrusted by the Benedictine nuns to a lay procurator, with the creation of various commercial and artisan structures, but above all with agricultural activity. The economic interests of the Scala fiefdom were intertwined with those of the Rocca land, which had been alternately governed by various feudal lords until 1509 when the fiefdom was purchased by the Spanish nobleman Andrea Valdina. The Valdina family governed the area until the first half of the 1700s, and this was Rocca's period of greatest splendor, above all thanks to the breeding of silkworms in the feud of Santa Maria della Scala that allowed the Valdina family to start a flourishing trade in silk products. At the end of the 18th century, with the decline of the Valdina family, the Rocca fiefdom passed into the hands of various bourgeois families while the Scala fiefdom continued to be administered by procurators until 1812 when the Bourbon king Ferdinand IV abolished feudal privileges and therefore the fiefdoms. The fief of Roccavaldina was transformed into a municipality incorporating the municipality of Santa Maria della Scala with the hamlet “Torre” which became a sub-municipality of Rocca.

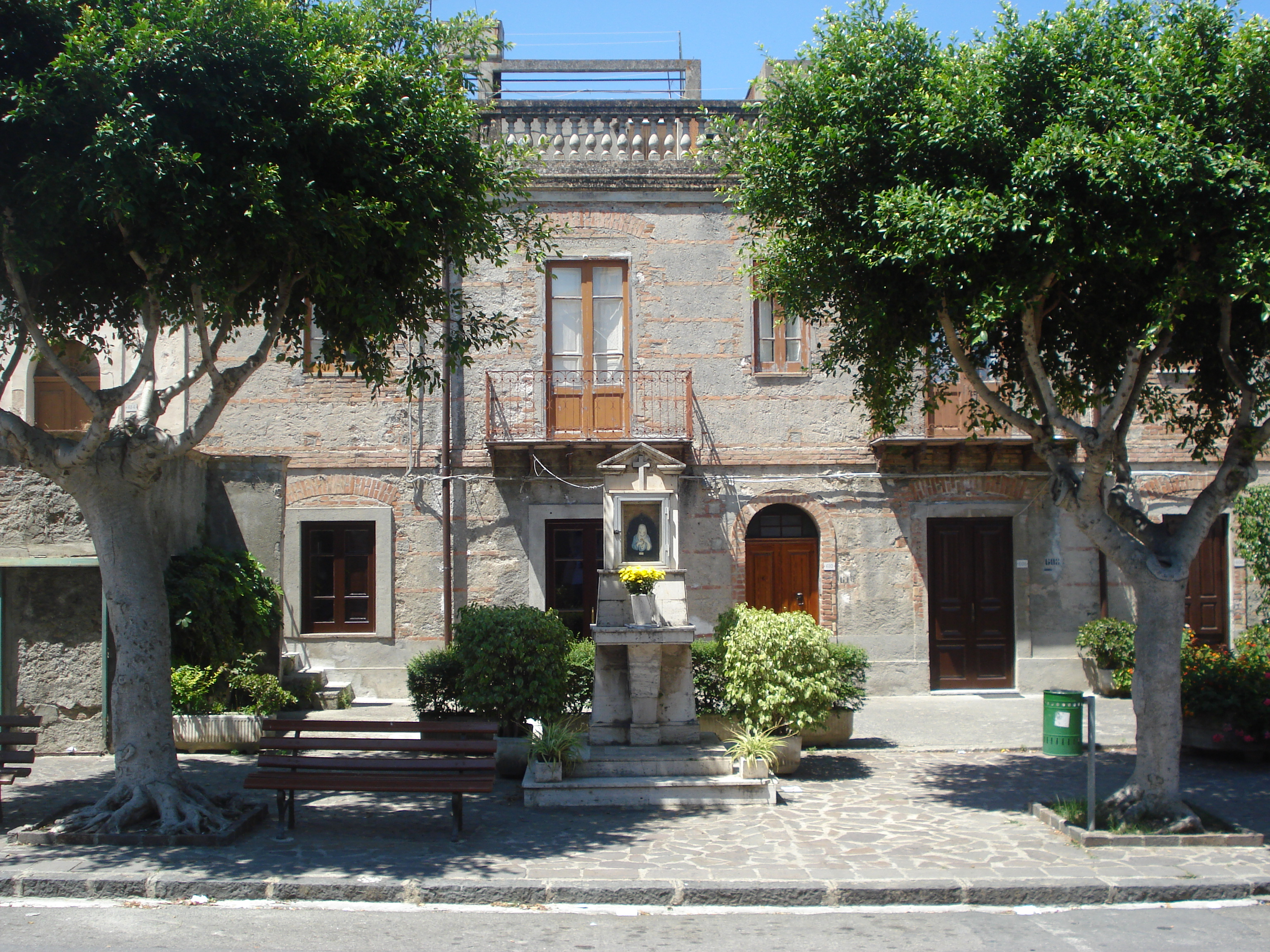
View of the historic center: the shrine of Our Lady of Tears

=== Contemporary era ===
In the second half of the 19th century, the land belonging to the monastery of Santa Maria della Scala in the former fiefdom of the same name was confiscated by the Italian State, divided into lots and sold by public auction. The new owners, who formed a small and influential bourgeois class, improved agricultural exploitation and reclaimed the coastal area.

At the beginning of the 20th century Torregrotta had become the center of the municipality's productive activities, also thanks to the construction of the local railway station, and in 1920 it surpassed Roccavaldina also in terms of number of inhabitants.

The population of Torregrotta felt that Roccavaldina was a foreign and detached place and the desire for greater autonomy manifested itself in requests of a religious nature. These requests were immediately opposed by the clergy of Rocca, who were intimidated by the emancipation of the people of Torregrotta rather than by a convinced religious intransigence, and had no substantial effect until 1921 when the church of San Paolino was elevated to the status of parish church. The climate of tension between the two communities was at its height during the “war of the burials” that had broken out when the people of Torregrotta, at night, began to dig up their dead from the Roccavaldina cemetery to transfer them to Torregrotta.

In the meantime, the Torregrotta bourgeoisie, who wanted to strengthen their hegemony within the local community by exploiting both their considerable economic power and the Torregrotta people's aversion to Roccavaldina, took advantage of a period of political and administrative crisis in the municipal government of Roccavaldina and, thanks to the support of various political figures, managed to obtain the autonomy of Torregrotta from Roccavaldina on October 21, 1923.

=== Symbols ===
Municipal coat of arms

Historical coat of arms

The city's coat of arms and banner, approved by city council resolution no. 84 of November 11, 1977, were officially granted by decree of the President of the Republic on March 15, 1978. The blazon, as reported in the Presidential Decree of concession, is as follows:

Quarterly per saltire: the first azure, an olive tree eradicated or; the second or, a bunch of grapes sable leaved proper; the third or, a wheat sheaf vert, set in pale; the fourth gules, a sheep argent. Exterior ornaments of a Comune.

— Heraldic description of the coat of arms

A gonfalon parted per fess of gules and azure, richly embellished with argent embroidery and charged with the aforesaid escutcheon, bearing the inscription centered in argent: Municipality of Torregrotta. The metal fittings and cords shall be of argent. The vertical staff shall be ensheathed in velvet of the field’s tinctures, alternated, with argent studs disposed in a spiral. The arrowhead shall be emblazoned with the escutcheon of the municipality, and the shaft shall be incised with the name. The cravat and tricolor ribbons of the national tinctures (vert, argent, and gules) are fringed with argent.

— Heraldic description of the banner

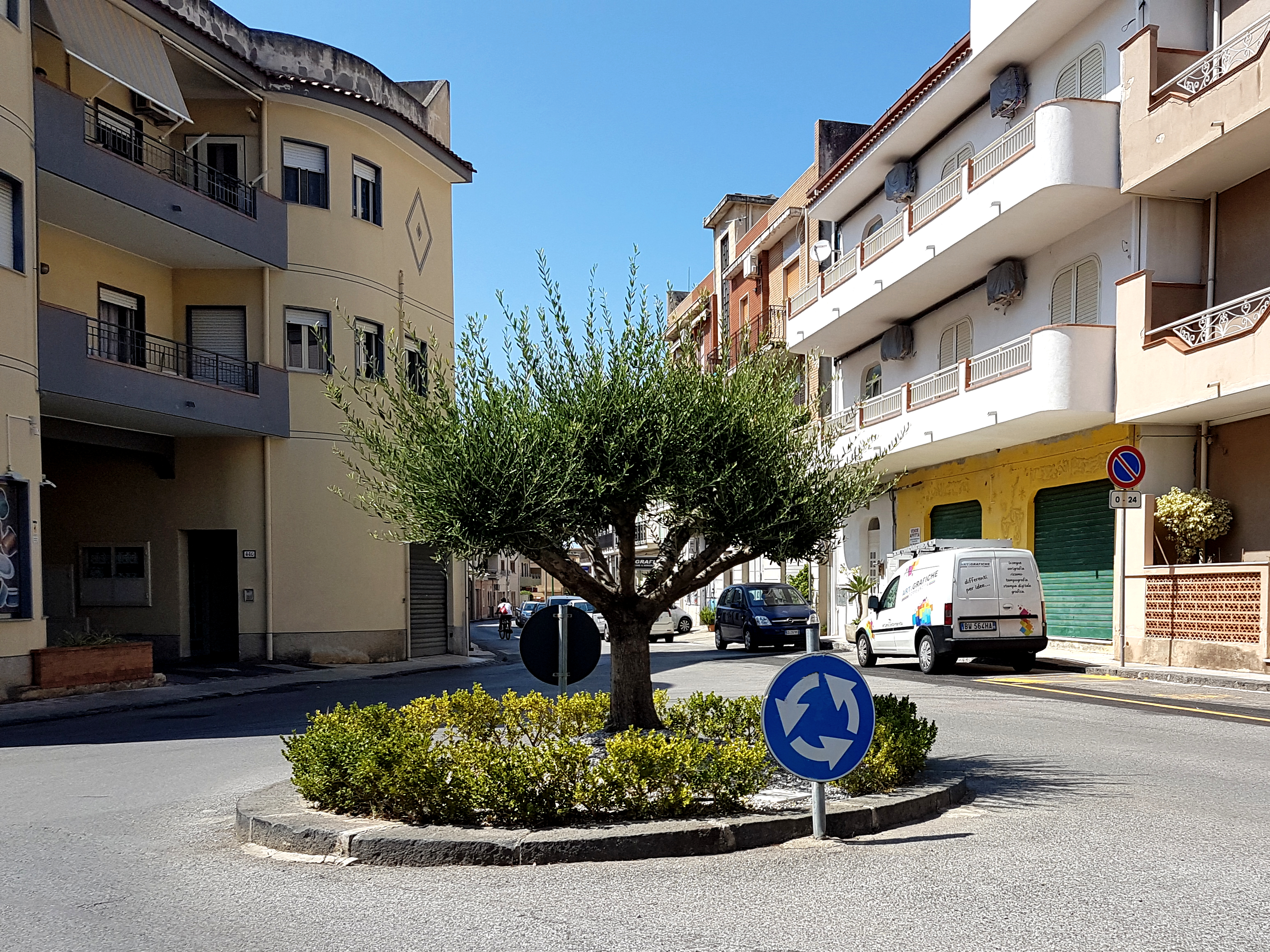
The roundabout in Via XXI Ottobre dedicated to the olive tree, one of the symbols of the city

The coat of arms of Torregrotta is the figurative emblem of the city's rural origins, symbolizing in the four predominant figures — grapes, ears of wheat, olive trees and sheep — the products linked to agriculture and livestock breeding that for a long time constituted the main source of prosperity for the people of Torregrotta. The figurative synthesis of the historical events of the territory of Torregrotta in Sicily is instead outlined in the historical coat of arms of the city proposed by a group of scholars in 1993 with the following blazon:

Party per pale: the first or, charged with a demi-figure of the Madonna della Scala accompanied by the legend ‘Mater Domini,’ supported by a fess argent charged with the inscription in sable: ‘Concedimus et donamus Casale quod dicitur Comitis’; a base azure wavy argent; the second azure, within a bordure or, charged with a round tower argent masoned and apertured, standing upon a base vert.

— Heraldic description of the historical coat of arms

The symbolism used represents the fief of Santa Maria della Scala in the Marian icon and the Valdina family in the tower, which is a reference to the building from which the place name originated. The juxtaposition of the two figures also represents the uniqueness of the present-day city.

== Monuments and places of interest ==
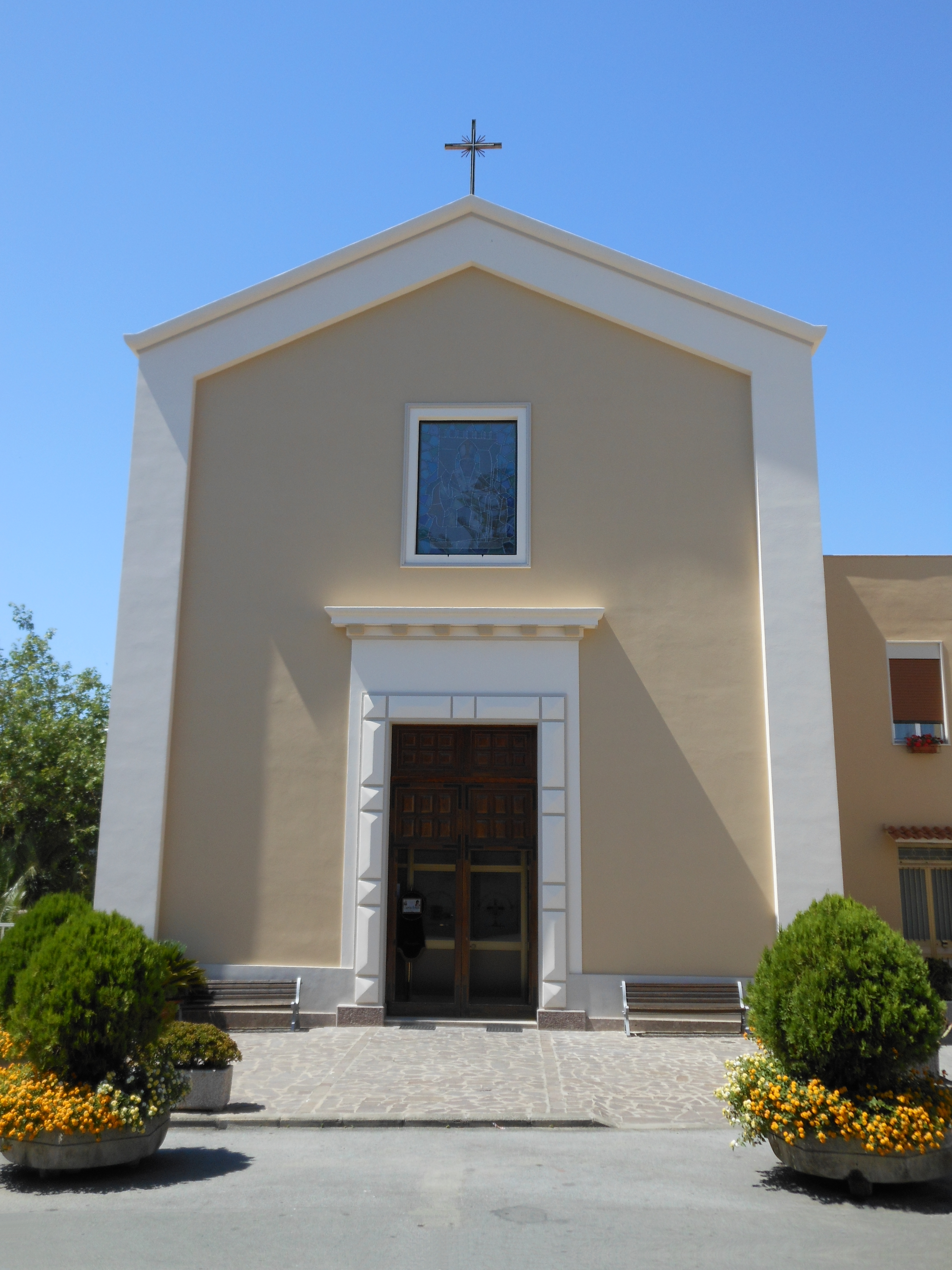
The Church of St. Paulinus

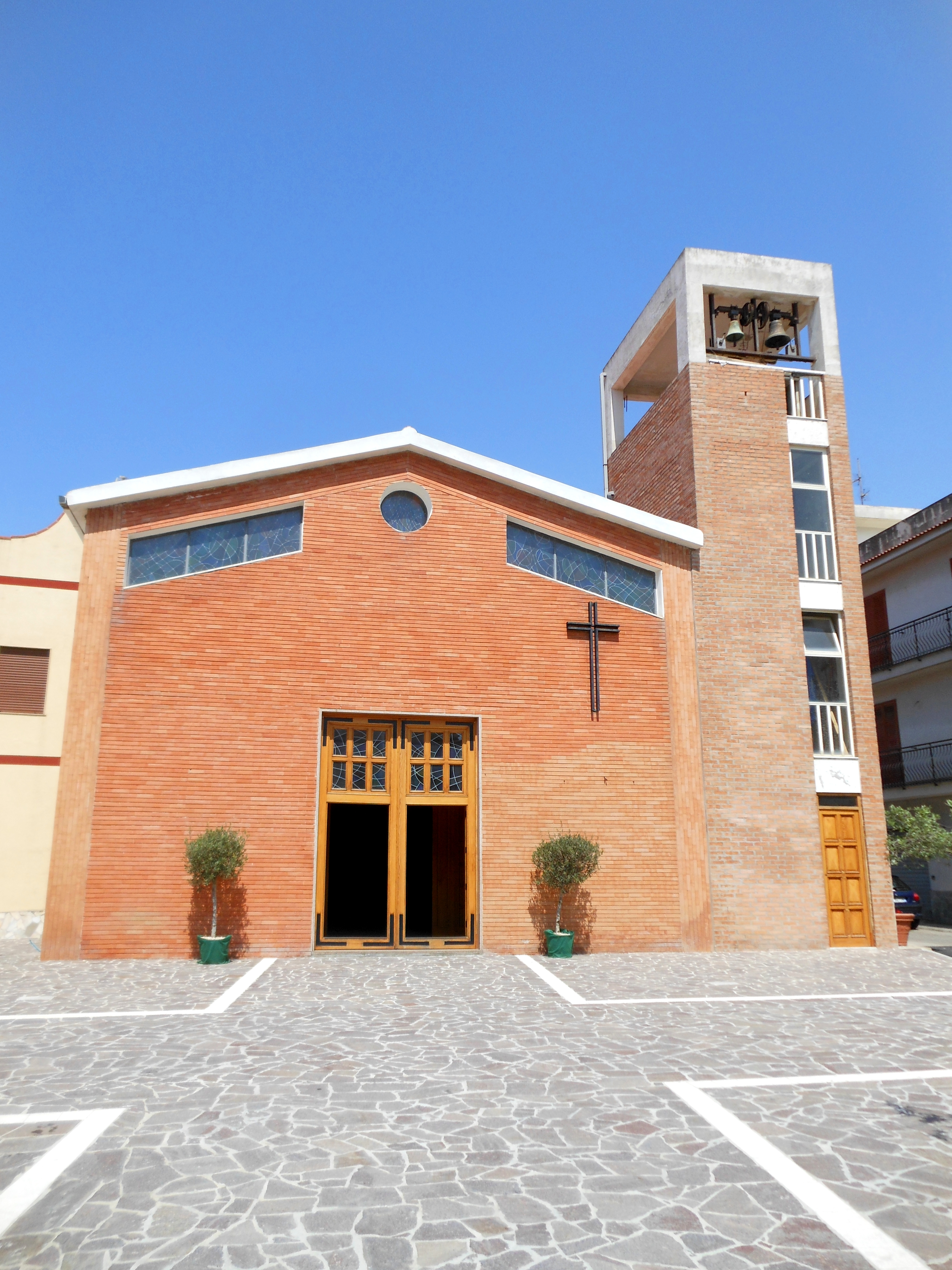
The church of Santa Maria della Scala

=== Religious architecture ===
- Church of San Paolino Vescovo. Inaugurated on June 29, 1943 in Via Mezzasalma, it houses a canvas from 1671 attributed to Francesco Iaconissa depicting the Deposition of Christ from the Cross that originally adorned the altar of the ancient church of San Paolino, formerly the church of Maria SS. della Pietà. A bell from 1886 that still works is also from this church, which has since been demolished. In 2010 the church was renovated and a stained glass window depicting St. Paulinus was placed on the façade.
- Church of Santa Maria della Scala. Opened to the faithful on April 10, 1976, it stands in the square of the same name and was dedicated on October 10 of the same year. The church is part of the centuries-old cult of the Virgin of the Staircase, whose ancient religious temple is believed to have been located in the historic center.
- Church of the Holy Crucifix. It was consecrated and opened for worship on January 22, 1925, on the occasion of the inauguration of the institute Daughters of Divine Zeal, of which it was part. In the seventies it underwent a major renovation with the addition of a further section and the replacement of the wooden roof with a reinforced concrete ceiling. Inside there are four wooden statues, including that of Our Lady of Tindari from 1925.
- Church of San Cristoforo. The period of construction is uncertain, but it probably has Byzantine origins. Notarial deeds indicate that it has been active since at least the beginning of the 19th century. Only the perimeter walls along Via San Vito remain.

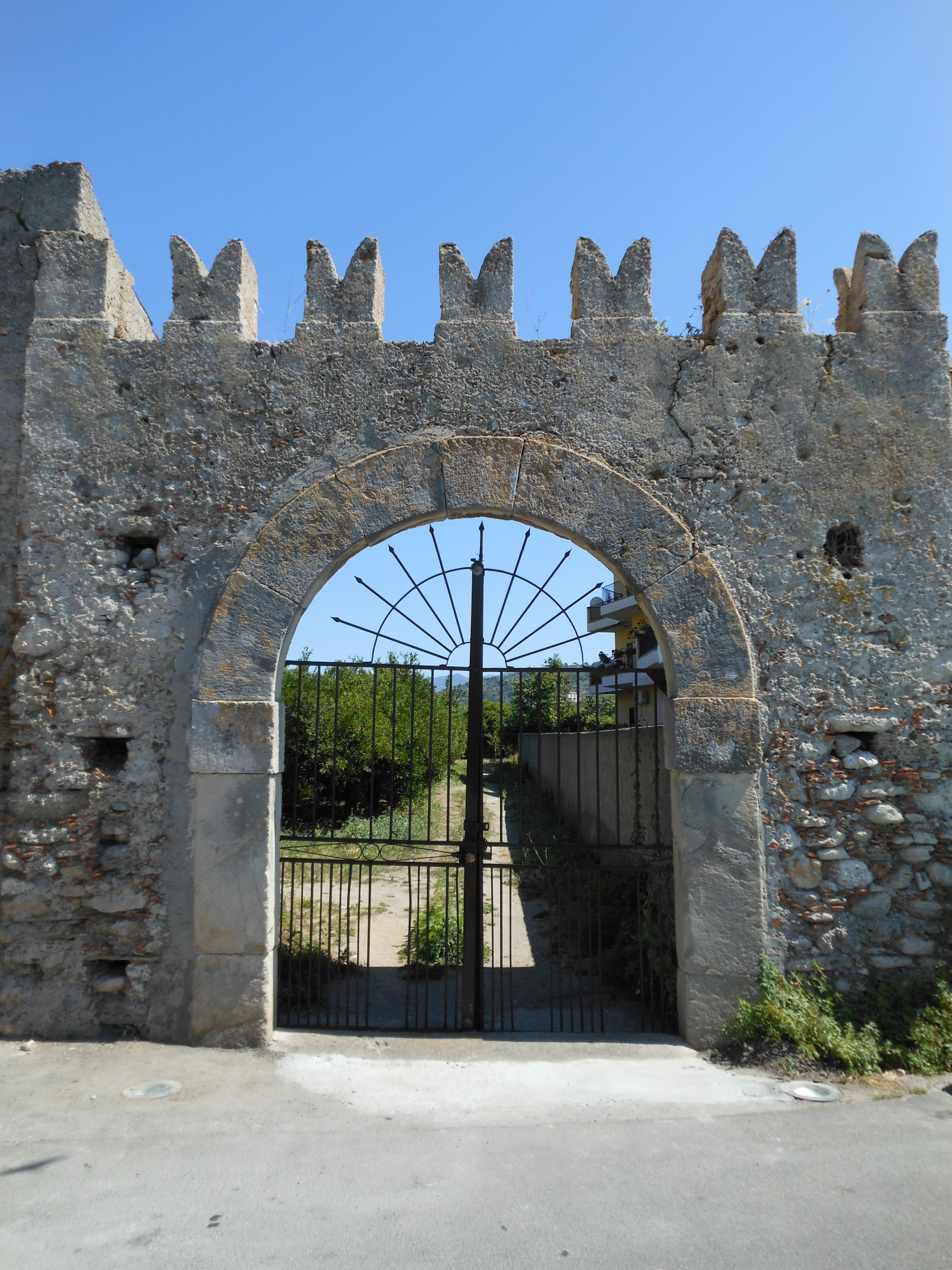
The 17th-century crenellated arch on Via Mezzasalma

=== Civil architecture ===
- Castrum Tower. Dating from between the 16th and 17th centuries, it was one of the defensive works of the Castrum built by Emperor Charles V to protect the peasants who lived in the hamlet of the Feud of Santa Maria della Scala. Over time it has undergone several modifications and alterations and today it is incorporated into houses from later periods along Vico Trieste.
- Crenellated arch. It was one of the entrance portals to the sixteenth century Castrum built by Emperor Charles V. However, it was built later, as the numbers 6 5 0 are still visible on the internal keystone, and can therefore be dated to 1650. The portal consists of a round arch surmounted by merlons. It is located on the edge of Via Mezzasalma.

=== Other ===
- Monument to the fallen. Inaugurated on September 7, 1919 in memory of the soldiers from Torregrotta who fell in the First World War, it is among the oldest in Italy and the first to be erected in Sicily. Made entirely of white marble, it consists of a square-based lower part on which four commemorative inscriptions are placed, and an upper part in the shape of an obelisk.

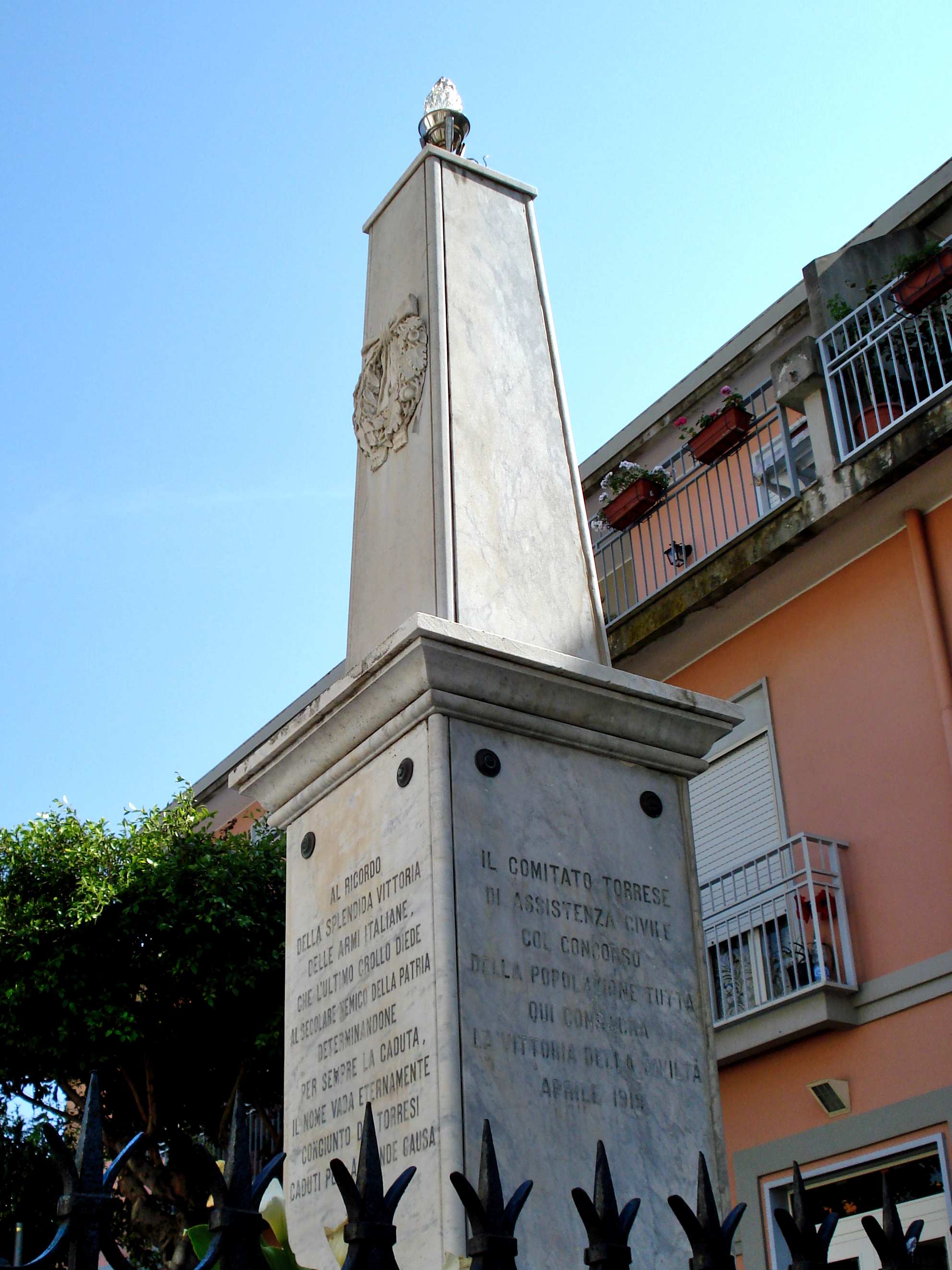
Detail of the war memorial

- Statue of St. Pio of Pietrelcina. Made entirely of bronze by the artist Prof. Giovanni De Pasquale, it was inaugurated on August 12, 2001 in the current Piazza Unità d'Italia.
- The Valdina family crest. Located at the edge of Via Mezzasalma, according to historians it was originally on the facade of a 16th-century building that no longer exists. The coat of arms is carved on a white marble slab and has the typical shape of a quartered Sicilian shield. Three of the four parts that make it up are similar to those of the coat of arms carved on the tomb of Andrea Valdina in the mother church of Roccavaldina. To the left of the shield the numbers 1 and 5 are engraved and it can therefore be dated to the second half of the 16th century.
- Icons depicting the Madonna della Scala. Carved on sandstone slabs 33 cm wide and 45 cm high, they were used to mark the boundaries of the ancient fiefdom of Santa Maria della Scala. Of the seven supposed icons, only four remain today: two in the territory of Torregrotta, in Via dei Mille and in the Largari district, and two in the territory of Valdina.
- Rock cave. It is located near Via San Vito and is part of a series of caves located between Torregrotta and the hamlet of Cardà in the municipality of Roccavaldina.

=== Buildings that no longer exist ===
- Church of Maria Santissima della Pietà. It was built in the second half of the 17th century. In the 19th century it became the center of the religious question in Torregrotta and was dedicated to Saint Paulinus. The building, in a state of abandonment, was demolished in the mid-20th century.

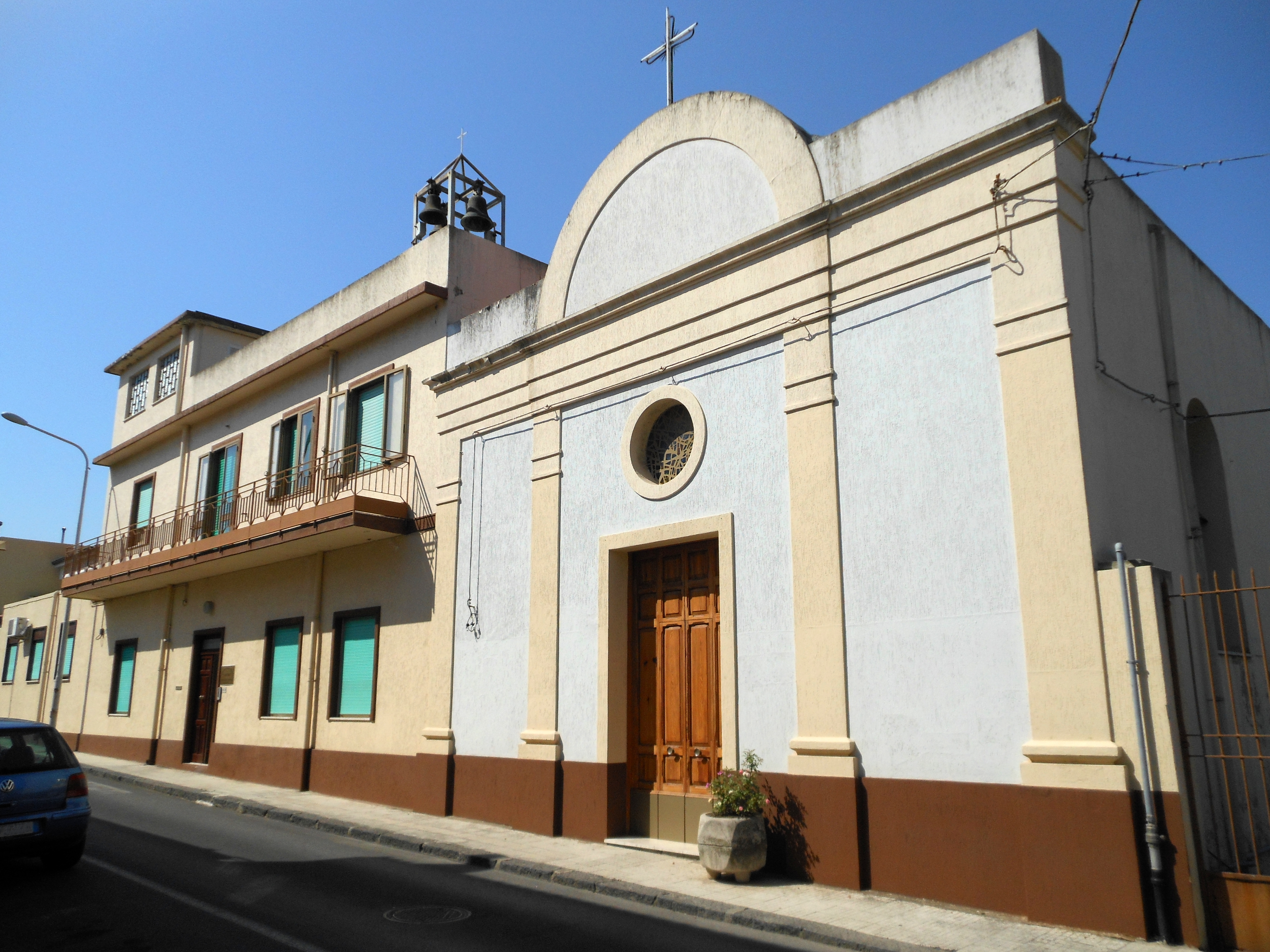
The Church of the Holy Crucifix and the former institute of the Daughters of Divine Zeal

- Church of Saint Mary Magdalene. It stood in the district of the same name along the ancient Via Maddalena and only a small portion of the perimeter wall remains. The place of worship and the agricultural complex that surrounded it were already active at the end of the 16th century, as from 1584 there are records of commercial exchanges of livestock and textiles on the occasion of the feast of Mary Magdalene. The church, whose function is known to have continued until at least 1834, was demolished around the middle of the 20th century during construction work on provincial road no. 59, while the reason for the demolition of the agricultural structures is unknown.
- 14th-century church. Along Vico Trieste, incorporated into a ruined 18th century building, there were traces of a 14th-century church of unknown dedication. According to historians' hypotheses, it could be the ancient religious temple dedicated to Santa Maria della Scala.
- Riposto della Torre. Also called magazzinazzu, it was a building that belonged to the ancient fiefdom of Santa Maria della Scala that stood on Via XXI Ottobre near the war memorial and was demolished between October 1954 and March 1955. Under the rose window of the main facade there was a large marble icon depicting the Madonna della Scala and a plaque with a Latin inscription which, according to historians, was the concession of the King of Sicily William II in 1168.
- Towers. One stood along Via Libertà, the other near Piazza Santa Maria della Scala, an integral part of an ancient warehouse.

== Society ==
=== Demographic evolution ===
The size of the population of Torregrotta in the historical periods prior to Italian unification is unknown. Almost certainly the territory of Torregrotta was inhabited since Roman times undergoing a process of depopulation starting from the late Middle Ages and becoming populated again in the 16th century thanks to the rebirth of the Casale, the 16th century nucleus of the present-day city. During the 19th century Torregrotta was affected by migratory phenomena that increased the population, which consisted of about 400 inhabitants in 1852. All the census surveys carried out by ISTAT (the Italian National Institute of Statistics) have shown a continuous growth in the number of people from Torregrotta with significant relative percentage variations, especially in the years between the 1971 and 1991 censuses. This demographic development was largely determined, especially in the 1970s, by the broader phenomenon of migratory flows from mountain municipalities to coastal centers, involving entire families and resulting in a prevalence over other provincial locations due to a series of factors:

- The birth and development of the nearby industrial center of Mela;
- The city's central geographic location in the Tyrrhenian coastal area of north-eastern Sicily;
- Good accessibility to other larger provincial towns.

Starting from the 2000s, the reduction in migration from the mountains to the coast has been compensated by immigration from abroad and by the positive trend in annual natural balances. As of December 31, 2019, Torregrotta is the 12th most populous municipality in the province of Messina, the first most densely populated municipality in the province, confirming its role as a center of attraction for the population, and the third municipality with the highest birth rate in the province.

=== Ethnic groups and foreign minorities ===
The foreign population is very limited but has been constantly increasing over the years. As of December 31, 2018, there were 279 immigrants legally residing in Torregrotta, equal to 3.8% of the entire population and an increase of 16 individuals compared to 2017. The most numerous nationalities are:

- Romania – 172
- Morocco – 31
- Poland - 21

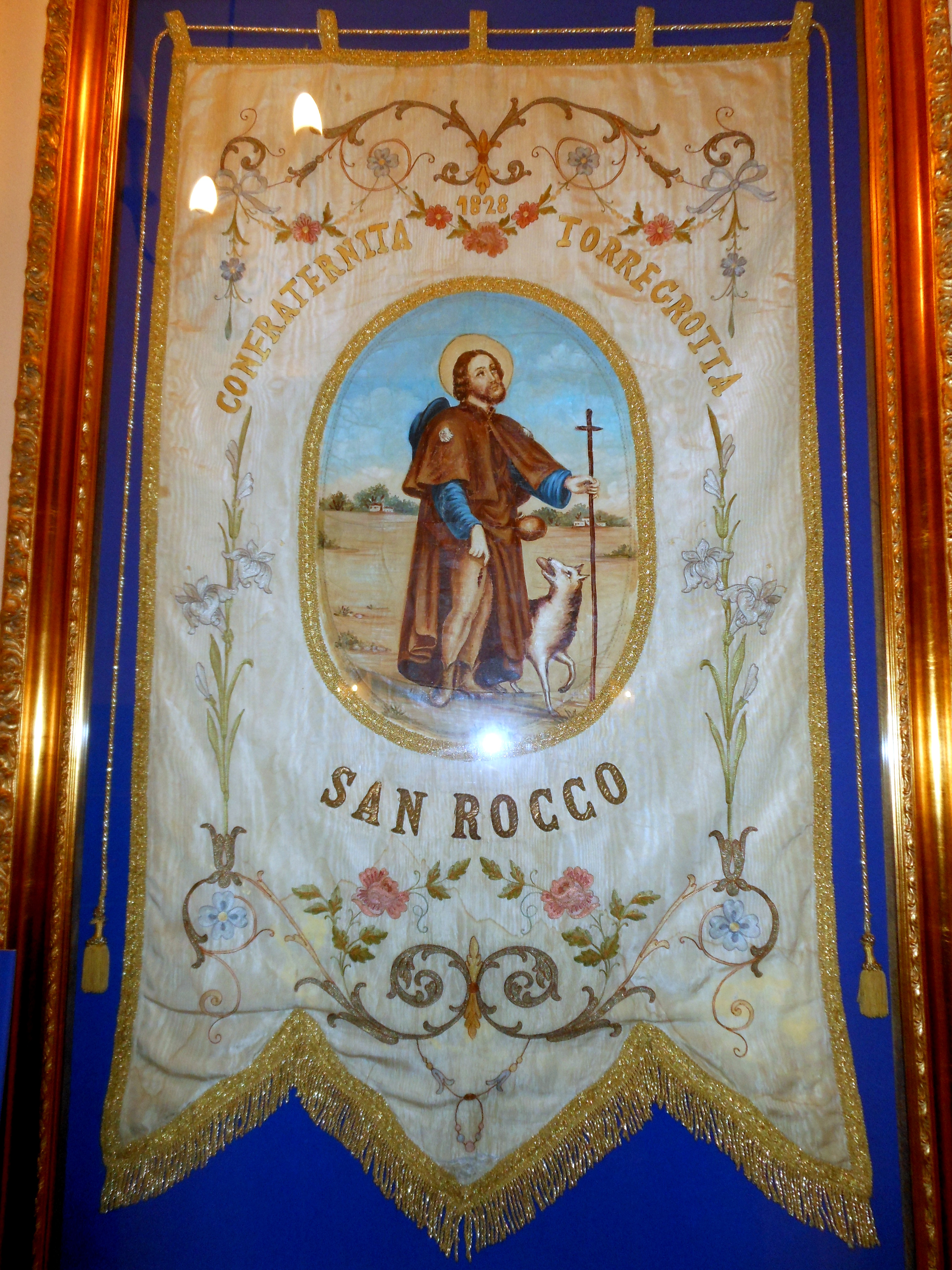
Ancient banner of the Confraternity of San Rocco.

=== Religion ===
The majority of the population, as in the rest of Italy, profess the Catholic Christian religion and belong to the two parishes into which the municipal territory is divided, both belonging to the Archdiocese of Messina-Lipari-Santa Lucia del Mela; the oldest parish, dedicated to St. Paulinus, was canonically established in 1921 while the one dedicated to Santa Maria della Scala was created in 1965. From 1925 to 2015 there was a religious institute in the city belonging to the congregation of the Figlie del Divino Zelo (Daughters of Divine Zeal) whose nuns were mainly dedicated to promoting religious vocations and the Christian education of children in the kindergarten attached to the institute's premises. All the religious traditions of the city of Torregrotta are handed down by the Confraternity of San Rocco which, founded in 1828, is the only confraternity left after the dissolution, in the 1940s, of that of San Giuseppe. Among the main cults practiced there is that of St. Paulinus, patron saint of the city, and that of Our Lady of the Stairs, dating back to the 12th century. Other important cults are that of St. Roch, one of the oldest, and of St. Anthony, whose veneration was spread among the population by the Daughters of Divine Zeal.

== Culture ==
=== Education ===
Torregrotta is home to several state schools: three kindergartens, three primary schools and a lower secondary school, all part of the local comprehensive institute. Until 2015 there were also two state-recognized private schools in the city: a secondary school (Liceo socio-psicopedagogico) and a kindergarten that was part of the former “Figlie del Divino Zelo” Institute.

The municipal library has a collection of 1,846 books, mainly of a literary and geographical nature. In May 2010 it was transferred to the new headquarters at the Service Center where exhibitions and evening courses are also periodically held.

=== Media ===
The city is home to the editorial offices and studios of the television channel Telespazio Sicilia. The digital radio station Radio Strega also broadcasts from Torregrotta.

== Anthropic geography ==
=== Town planning ===
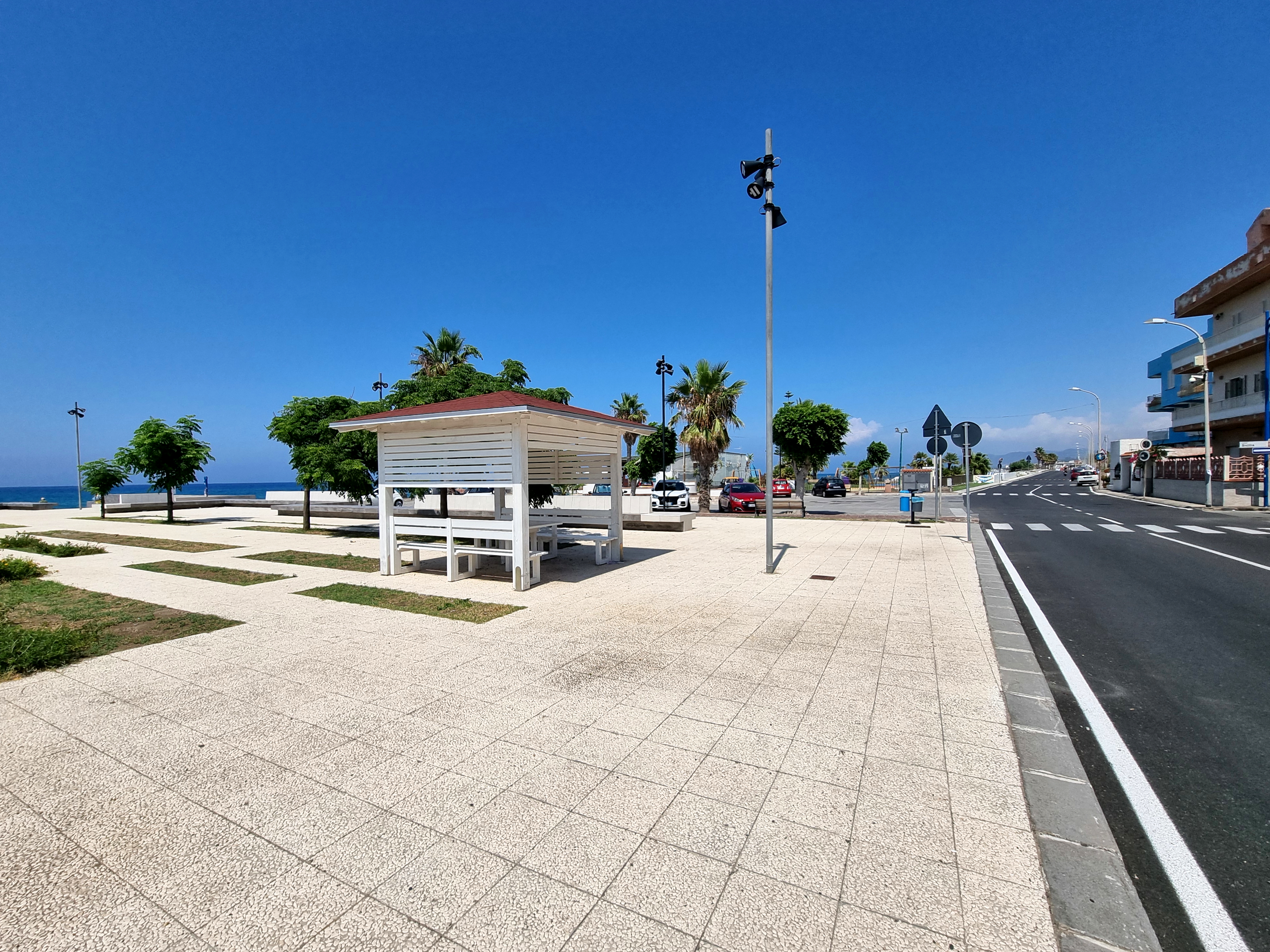
Glimpse of the seafront: Largo P. Impastato and Via R. Livatino

The historical urban layout, the result of the transformations of the city starting from 1526, was constituted in 1930 by a square, seven streets and ten alleys.

During the second half of the twentieth century, the urban fabric developed according to the provisions of the Building Program approved in 1974 which envisaged the residential and road expansion of the city along two main axes, Via XXI Ottobre and Viale Europa, and from Via Nazionale towards the coast with a network of new roads.

From 2020 the territory of Torregrotta is governed by the municipal general development plan which provides for the expansion of the city with tourist, commercial and executive centers and the redevelopment of the existing residential fabric.

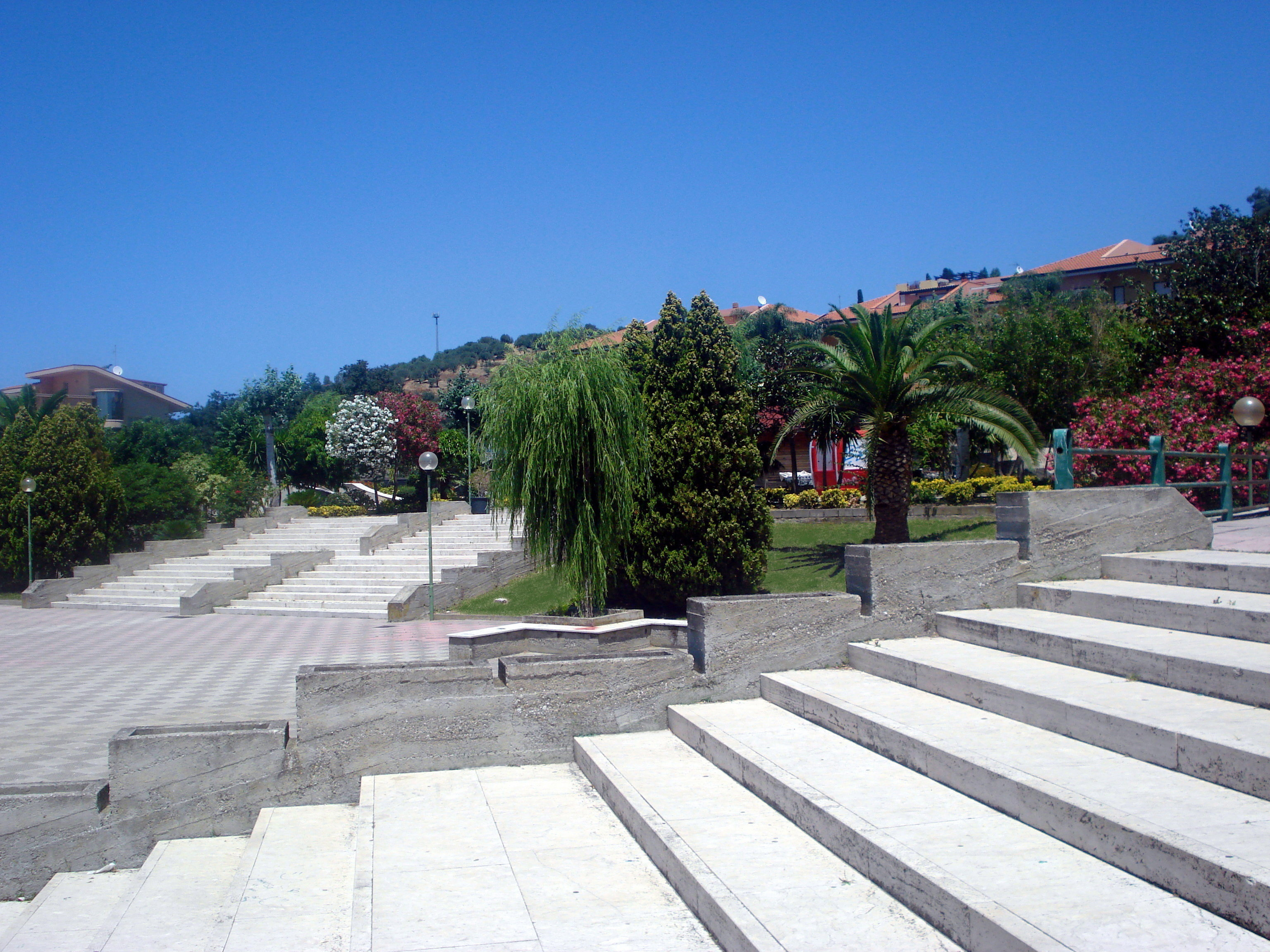
Piazza Unità d'Italia

=== Historical subdivisions ===
The city center is traditionally divided into four main areas corresponding to as many districts which, however, have no legal status:

(in alphabetical order)

- Crociere: it is the area of the city that extends close to and around Via Crocieri. The name of the latter derives from the fact that it forms a cross with Via XXI Ottobre and was originally referred to as Crociera Street.
- Grotta: it is one of the two districts that make up the historic center. It appears in various documents as early as the 16th century and then during the 19th century.
- Scala: this is the area of the city that extends roughly between Via Nazionale and the Rosario Livatino seafront and is mentioned as a rural district from the first half of the nineteenth century. In the 16th century there was a fondaco (a building similar to a modern motel) here that belonged to the fiefdom of Santa Maria della Scala and for this reason it was called the Fondaco della Scala.
- Torre: until the beginning of the 19th century the district was called Casale and was the inhabited center of the fiefdom of Santa Maria della Scala. Already present in the Middle Ages and then rebuilt in 1526, it constitutes the historical center of the city.

There are several other districts, both urban and rural, sometimes included within the four mentioned above, whose historical memory, in most cases, has been lost: Badessa, Barone, Bottisco, Bruca, Cotugnara, Ficarotta, Granatara, Largari, Maddalena, Marsilio, Perara, Pirrera, Radali, Sciabecco, Timoniere, Triari.

== Economy ==
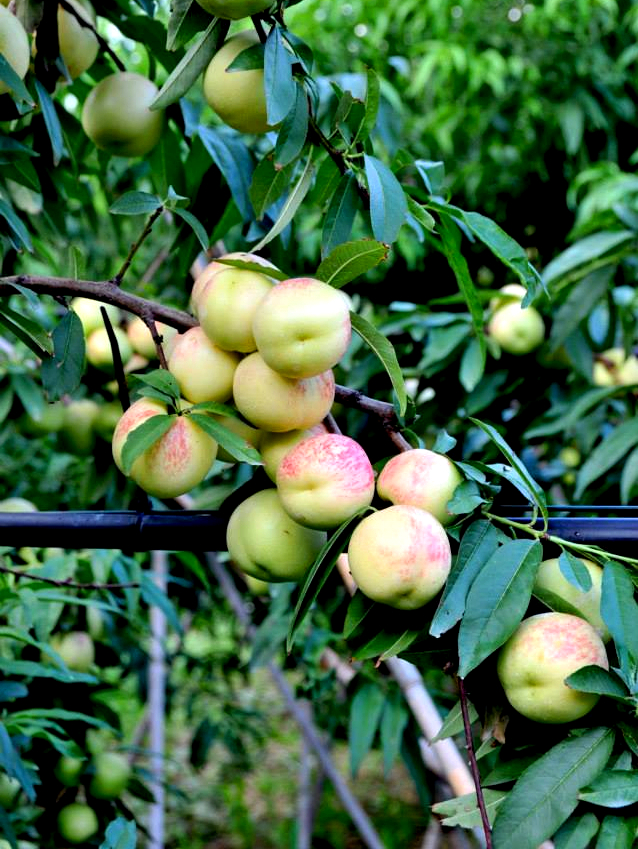
Sbergie in a peach orchard in Torregrotta

=== Agriculture ===
Historically, agriculture has played a dominant role in the economy of Torregrotta. Since the Middle Ages, activities related to the land have been the main source of livelihood for the people of Torregrotta, who were associated with a purely agricultural community that is also reflected in the municipal coat of arms. However, during the 20th century agriculture declined substantially in favor of industry and, above all, the tertiary sector. In fact, in the 2001 census, agricultural activity constituted only 7% of the workforce in Torregrotta and absorbed about 2% of the resident labor force. The utilized agricultural area also decreased from 264.03 hectares in 1970 to 191.33 hectares in 2010, corresponding to 46.3% of the entire municipal territory and divided into 101 farms. The latter are mainly small to medium-sized, in most cases they are managed by direct growers and use traditional cultivation techniques. This is due to the high level of subdivision of agricultural land, typical of the entire provincial context, which limits the use of agricultural mechanization.

The main sector of agriculture in Torregrotta is horticulture, with a production area equal to 37% of the UAA. During the calendar year, tomato and eggplant plantations alternate with the cultivation of early potatoes (Sieglinde cultivar), which over the course of the last century has become the leading crop in terms of quantity produced. In addition to local sales, it is exported to German markets, despite the fact that a prolonged crisis in the sector and the low returns have reduced the cultivated area at the end of the 20th century in favor of other vegetables.

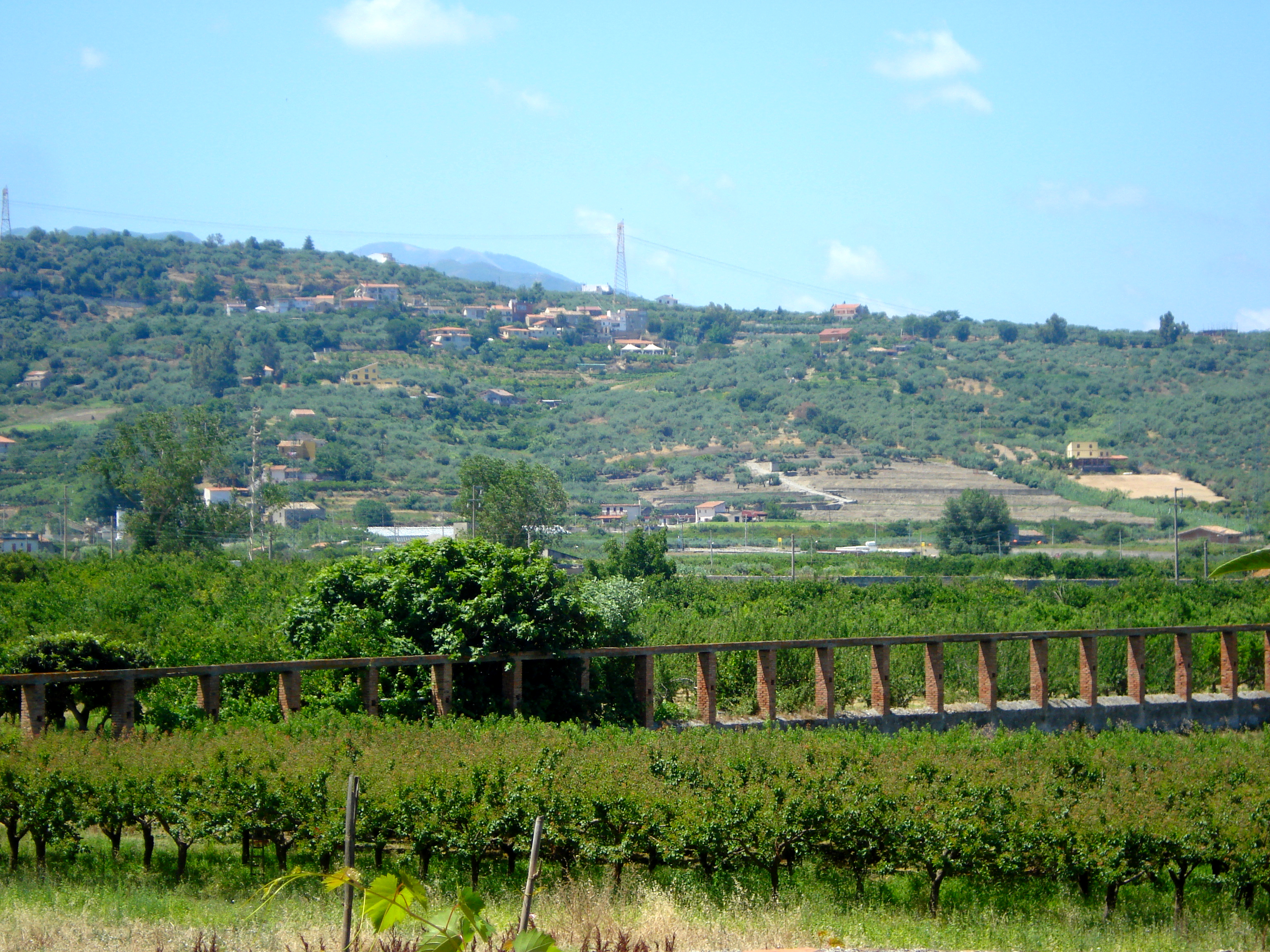
A vineyard in Torregrotta and an ancient irrigation channel

Among the other agricultural products of Torregrotta, the smergia (a type of nectarine) plays an important role, as it is a peculiar type of nectarine, typical of the Niceto valley, whose organoleptic properties distinguish it from other peaches. Nevertheless, the cultivation of nectarines is very limited, representing only 8% of the UAA, and its commercial distribution is restricted to the markets of the provinces of Messina, Catania and Reggio Calabria.

The most widespread crop, which is concentrated in the hilly areas, is the olive tree (24.1% of the UAA), of the Ogliarola Messinese and Nocellara Messinese varieties. The resulting oil production is not put on the market but is almost always destined for self-consumption by the olive growers.

The citrus sector, which accounts for 22.2% of the total UAA, is composed of Femminello and Interdonato lemons, Tarocco oranges and mandarins, whose production, together with the previous ones, is mainly sent to industries for processing into juices and derivatives.

Wine growing is limited, and carried out with grapes of the Nerello mascalese and Nero d'Avola varieties. The Mamertino DOC is produced from the latter variety.

Since the early 2000s, new experimental agricultural products have been added to the traditional crops of the Torregrotta area, including mango and asparagus.

=== Industry and handicrafts ===
The first industrial plants in Torregrotta were established starting in 1935, when a process of industrialization progressively involved all the activities connected to the production of bricks that had begun at the beginning of the century. The brick industry reached its maximum expansion in the seventies, guaranteeing a high level of employment, and then rapidly contracted in the 2000s with the closure of almost all the factories. This was caused both by the decrease in demand for construction products and by the depletion of the historic clay quarries. Other industrial initiatives arose in the 1950s in the wine and dairy sectors; the latter remained active until the end of the 2000s.

Since the beginning of the 21st century, with the closure of the larger factories, the secondary sector in Torregrotta has essentially consisted of small and medium-sized artisanal businesses, operating mainly in the construction and manufacturing sectors, and represents about 33% of the workforce in Torregrotta. The workshops and factories are located in the two production centers of Torregrotta: The first, of modest dimensions, is located to the north-west of the town; the second, which also includes the old industrial factories and disused clay quarries, extends into the central-eastern sector of the municipal territory, straddling the A20 motorway and the railway line.

=== Tertiary sector ===
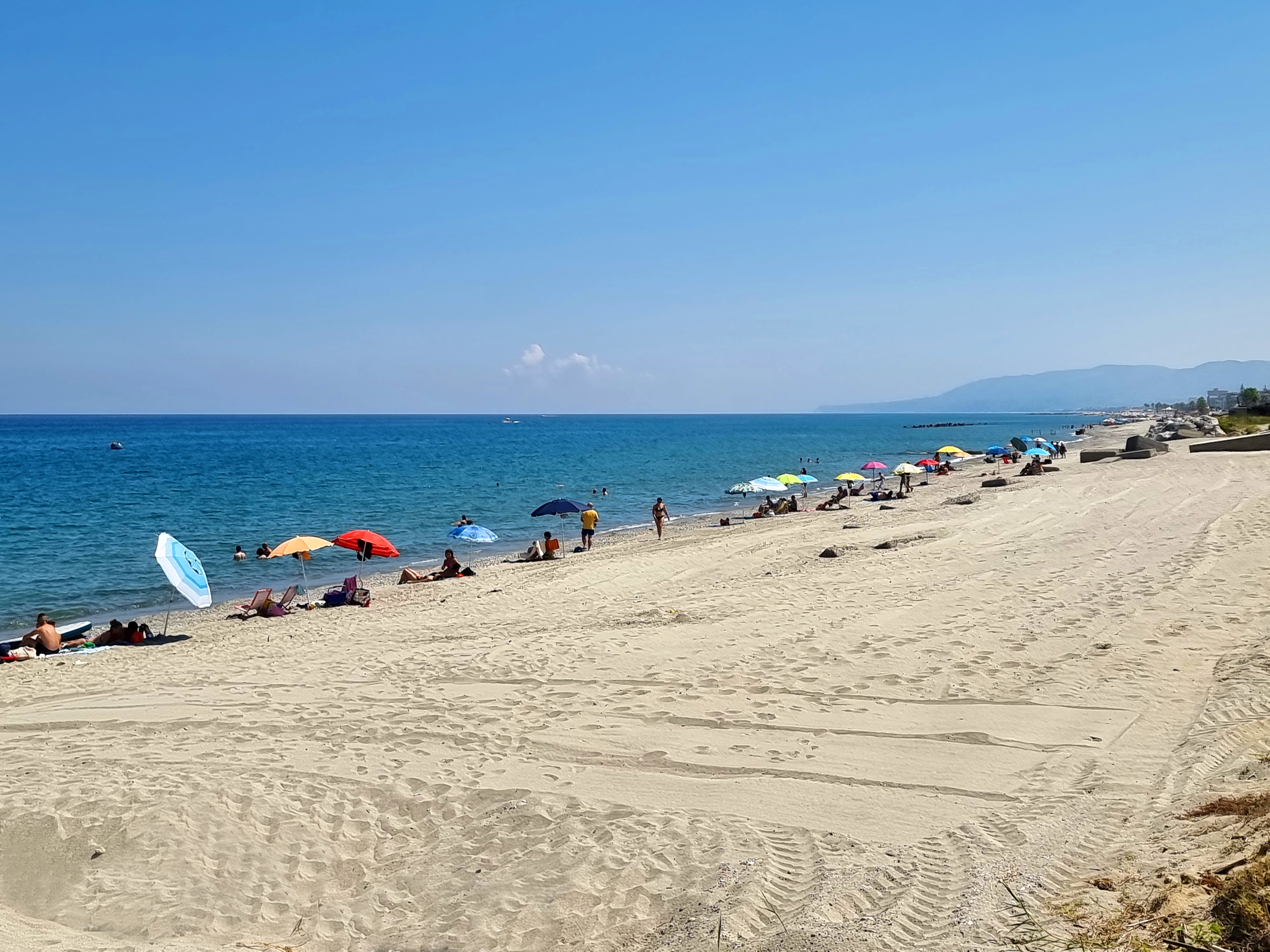
The beach at Torregrotta

Since the 1990s, the service sector has become the most important sector of the economy of Torregrotta, accounting for about 60% of the city's employment. The main sectors are wholesale and retail trade, public administration and education, health and social services, communications, transportation and warehousing. There are also some activities, albeit very limited, such as real estate, renting, IT and research, monetary and financial intermediation, and activities linked to tourism. The coastal area is very lively, and in recent years has attracted interest from both locals and tourists, so much so that in 2023 Torregrotta was included in the list of tourist municipalities in Sicily. Furthermore, since 2020, with the approval of the municipal General Regulatory Plan, new urban areas have been included both for the realization of activities related to tourism and for the commercial expansion of medium and large-scale distribution and office space.

== Infrastructure and transportation ==
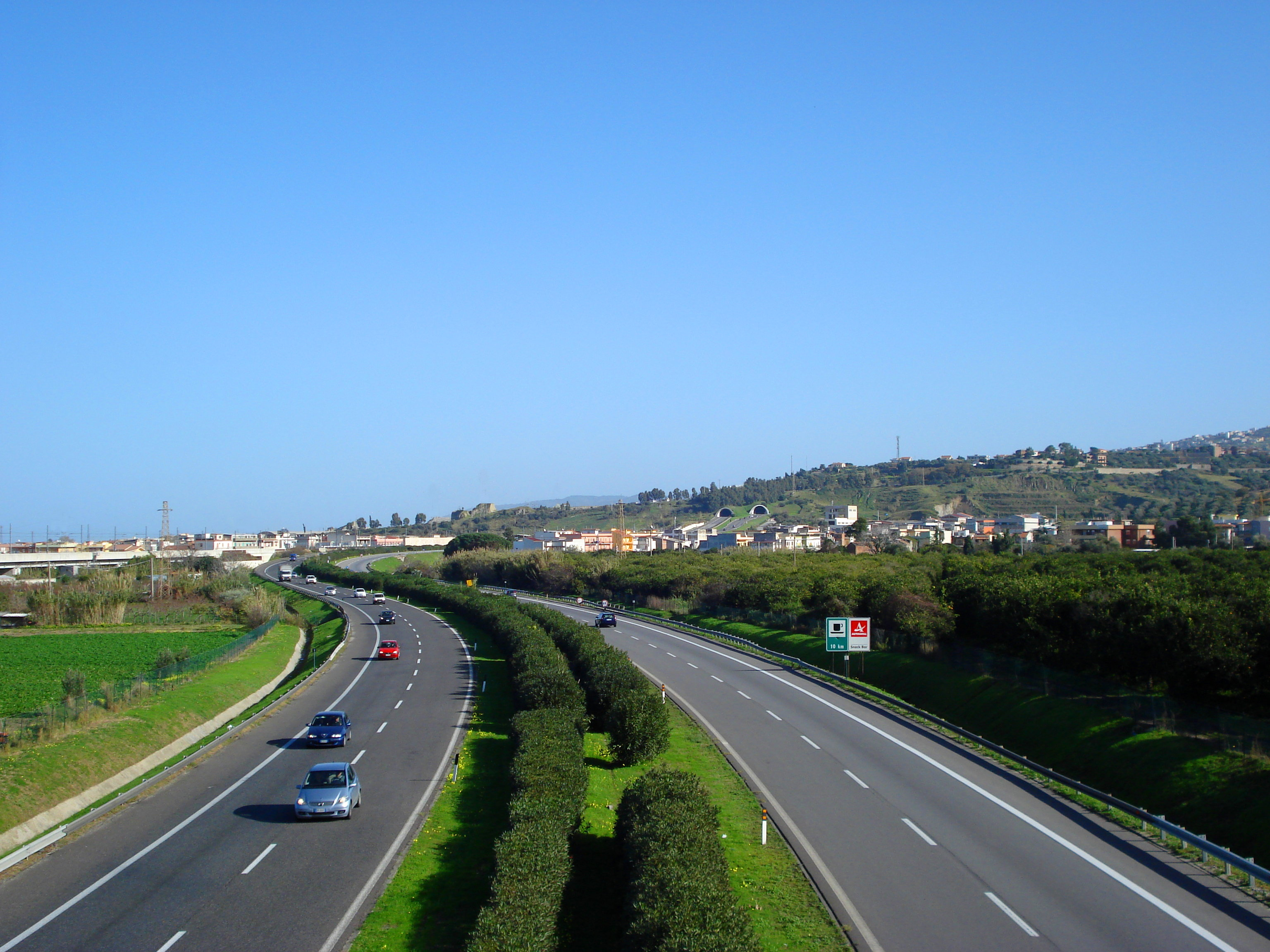
The A20 highway near Torregrotta.

=== Roads ===
All the major roads of the Sicilian Tyrrhenian backbone cross through Torregrotta. The A20 Messina-Palermo highway crosses the municipal territory, running on an embankment and passing over several city streets via an overpass. State road 113 Settentrionale Sicula also passes through the center of Torregrotta and is the main road connecting the town to the neighboring coastal centers and the nearest highway junctions. Another major road is the ASI road (Milazzo - Torregrotta), which branches off near the Milazzo highway junction, crosses the Mela industrial area and ends in Torregrotta. Several provincial roads that pass through the municipality connect it with the surrounding hill towns: provincial road 59 connects Torregrotta to Roccavaldina, while 60 leads to Monforte San Giorgio a few kilometers further on.

=== Railways ===
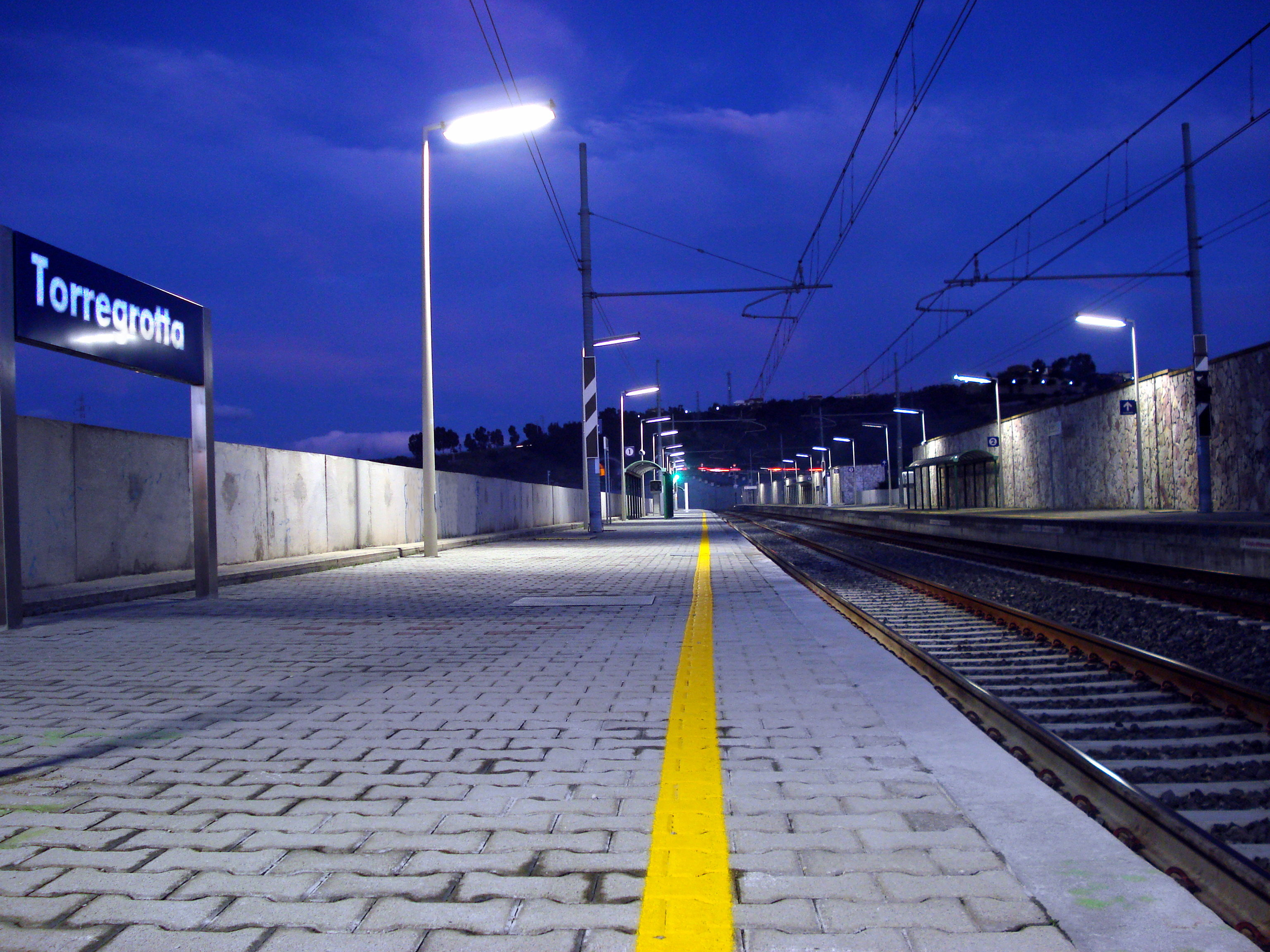
Torregrotta railway station in the evening.

Torregrotta has a railway station on the Palermo-Messina line. The station was opened to passenger traffic in 2009 on the new double track line that replaced the old single track line in the same year. In fact, until August 8, 2009, the service was provided from the historic railway station, which is now used for social purposes. The new station, which is located close to the A20 motorway, only provides passenger services and is a stop for most of the regional trains running on the line, providing connections to the provincial capital and the main towns on the Sicilian Tyrrhenian coast. It also serves several villages in the district of Torregrotta to which it is also connected by two bus routes.

=== Urban transportation ===
There is no public transportation in Torregrotta. However, the city is served by several private bus lines that connect it with neighboring towns and the main localities in the province of Messina. Until 1928 the Messina-Barcellona Pozzo di Gotto suburban tram line was active, which also had a passenger stop in Torregrotta, at km 43, near the present-day intersection of Via Nazionale and Via XXI Ottobre.

== Administration ==
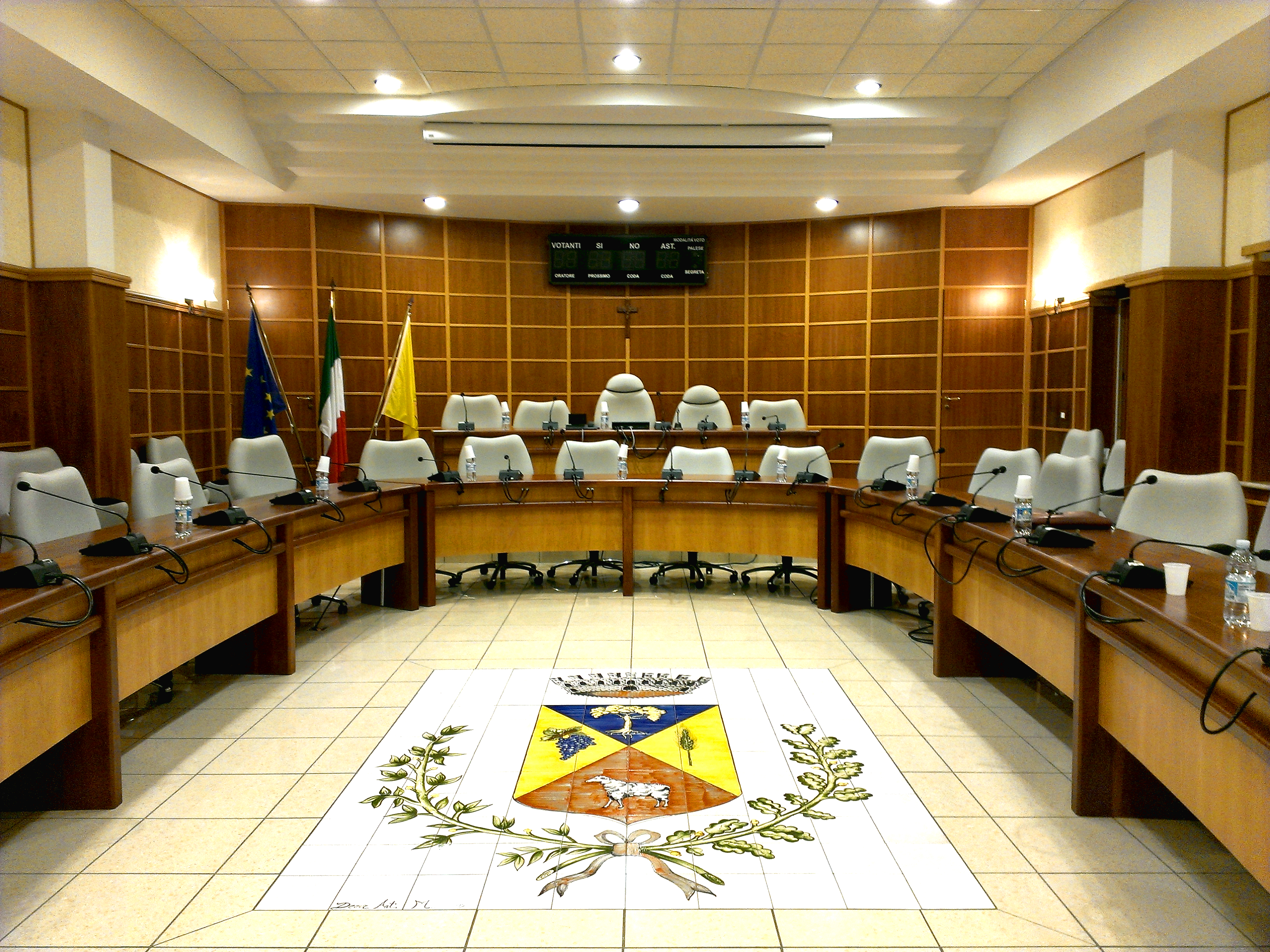
“Domenico Magliarditi” hall, Torregrotta City Council headquarters.

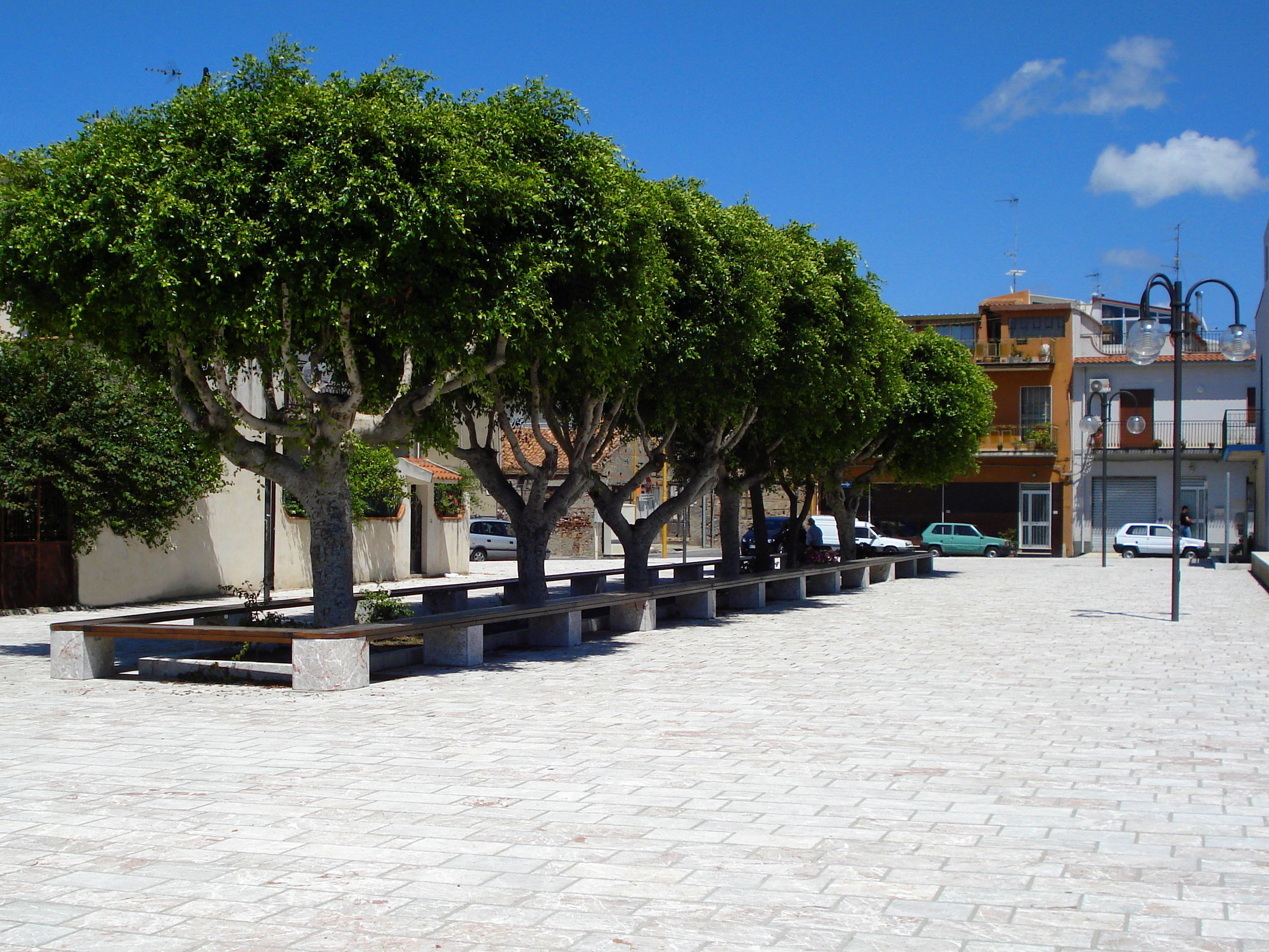
Piazza Giovanni Tripoli, who was mayor from 1956 to 1964.

The municipal authority of Torregrotta was established on October 21, 1923 with Royal Decree No. 2333.

The first form of municipal government in Torregrotta therefore dates back to the Fascist period, during which, with the promulgation of law nº 237 of February 4, 1926 (“Establishment of the Podestà and the Municipal Council in municipalities with a population not exceeding 5,000 inhabitants”), the functions previously carried out by mayors, municipal councils and town councils were transferred to the podestà. The first podestà of Torregrotta, appointed by Royal Decree on July 8, 1926, was Pietro Mezzasalma, who set the administrative machine of Torregrotta in motion by appointing the town clerk and other municipal employees and approving various regulations and measures.

In fact, in the three years following the granting of autonomy, Torregrotta did not have its own municipal administration, but rather the prefectural commissioners of Roccavaldina also managed the new municipality.

After the fall of fascism, in October 1943 the prefect appointed the first mayor of Torregrotta: Gaetano Mezzasalma. In October 1946, thanks to the legislative decree nº1 of January 7, 1946 (“Reconstitution of the municipal administrations on an elective basis”), the administrative elections were held and the first City Council of Torregrotta was elected, composed of 15 councilors. The Council in turn appointed Giuseppe Saladino as Mayor, who was therefore the first elected mayor of Torregrotta.

In November 1964 Anna Scalia was elected, the first woman mayor of Torregrotta and widow of the mayor Giovanni Tripoli, who died suddenly on October 11, 1964.

With Regional Law No. 7 of August 26, 1992, which anticipated State Law No. 81 of March 25, 1993 (“Direct election of the mayor, the provincial president, the municipal council and the provincial council”), the direct election of the mayor by the citizens was introduced. At the same time, this measure modified another important aspect of the municipal administration: the appointment of the council that was previously elected by the municipal council was now appointed directly by the mayor.

As for the municipal offices, in the first years of the organization's existence, the offices were housed in rented premises. On August 25, 1929, the foundation stone was laid for the construction of the current town hall, which was completed during the administration of the podestà Coppolino.

=== Other administrative information ===
Torregrotta was the first municipality in the province of Messina to establish a register of civil unions with resolution of the City Council no. 36 of September 14, 2012. As of December 31, 2013, there were 6,733 citizens with the right to vote, of whom 3,216 were men and 3,517 women, divided into 8 electoral sections.

The municipality of Torregrotta is part of the following supra-municipal organizations: agricultural region no. 9 (Coastal hills of Milazzo).

== Sports ==
In soccer, the biggest local club, founded in 1973, is A.S.D. Torregrotta, which plays in the Prima Categoria league. In its history it reached the Eccellenza league in the 2002-03 season and won a cup in its league, the “Tonino Caltagirone” Trophy of the Prima Categoria, in the 1997-98 season. The main activity of Torregrotta soccer is carried out in the youth sector whose soccer school is recognized as “elite” level by the FIGC. In women's soccer, for the short period of three consecutive seasons, the S.S.F. Torregrotta club was active and played in two Serie C tournaments and one Serie B tournament.

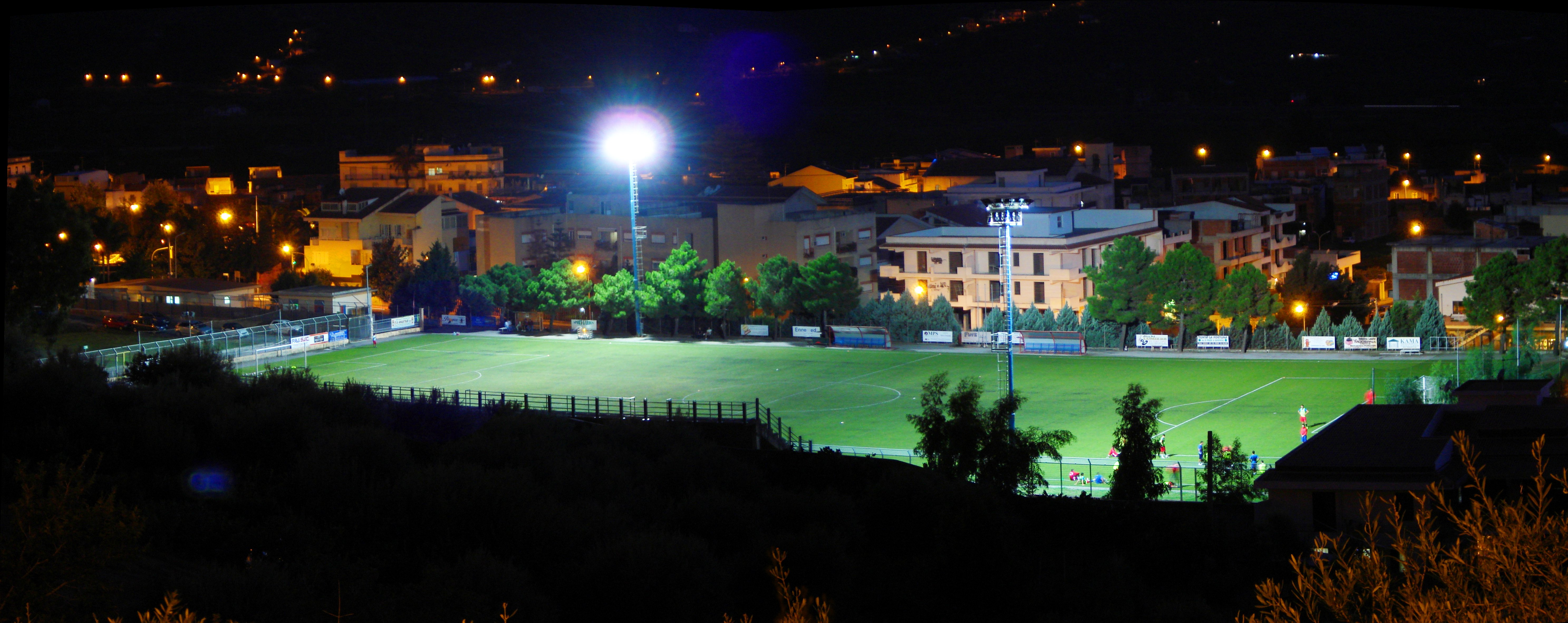
P. Gangemi Municipal Stadium

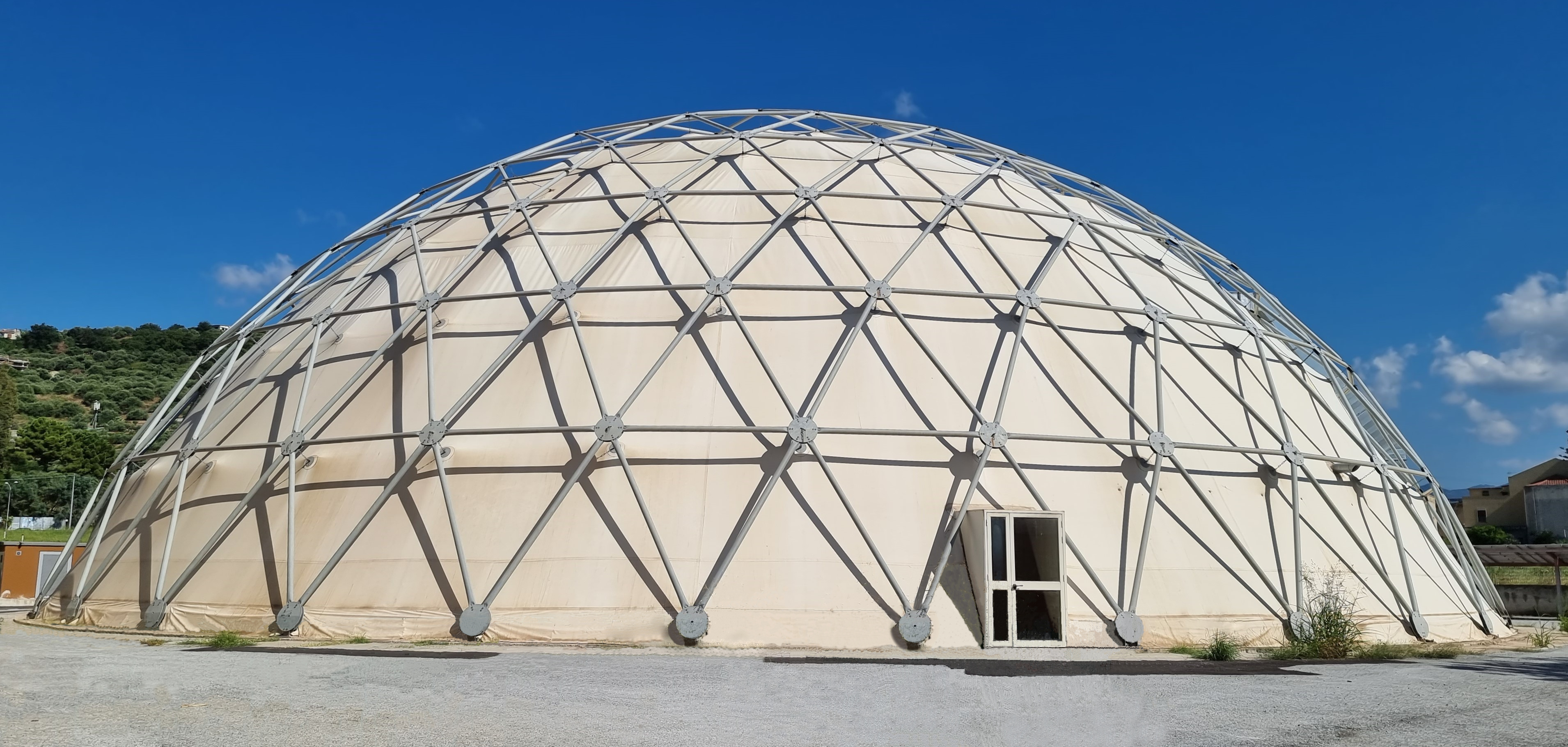
The geodesic dome

In volleyball, the New Volley Team Torregrotta plays in the women's Serie D championship and also organizes activities for young people.

Several clubs practice athletics:

- the A.S.D. G.S. Indomita, founded in 1953, is the oldest sports club in Torregrotta. In 1988 it received the Bronze Star for Sporting Merit from CONI and in 1995 the Golden Discobolus for merit awarded by the Italian Sports Center. Throughout its history, the club has also branched out into other disciplines and organized various sporting events.
- The ASD Meeting Sporting Club Runner, founded in 2015, is mainly active in running and organizes a national race every year.
- The A.S.D. Club Atletica Torrese, a club active from 1986 to 2013 that was mainly active in the women's sector.

There are also various amateur sports clubs for cycling, tennis, table tennis, futsal and dancesport.

Two motorsport events are held in Torregrotta: the Torregrotta - Roccavaldina Slalom, an autoslalom race included in the Italian Slalom Championship calendar, and the Tyrrhenian Rally, a race valid for the Italian Rally Cup, which includes nine special stages, three of which are along provincial road no. 59 that connects Torregrotta to Roccavaldina.

=== Sports facilities ===
The following sports facilities are located in Torregrotta:

- The Municipal Stadium for soccer, built in the 1980s and named after Pietro Gangemi in 2016, has a capacity of 1,500 spectators and is equipped with a synthetic turf field and artificial lighting. The facility is used for home games of local soccer clubs as well as clubs from neighboring towns that do not have a suitable field. In 2007 it hosted the match between the under-18 national teams of Spain and Egypt for the 1st Mediterranean Tournament.
- Geodesic dome: inaugurated on May 26, 2023, it is a multi-purpose sports facility. It hosts the activities and internal competitions of the New Volley Team Torregrotta.

== See also ==
- Timeline of Torregrotta
- Torregrotta railway station
- Niceto Valley

== Bibliography ==
- Coco, Angelo; De Leo, Nino; Di Stefano, Pietro; Pandolfo, Pippo (1993). Torregrotta, una storia ricostruita [Torregrotta, a reconstructed history] (in Italian). Messina: EDAS. ISBN 88-7820-080-8.
- Coco, Vincenzo (2022). Il Consiglio Comunale di Torregrotta. Dall'autonomia ai nostri giorni [The Torregrotta Municipal Council: From autonomy to the present day] (in Italian). Milazzo: Lombardo Edizioni. ISBN 979-12-80566-18-8.
- Pandolfo, Pippo (1999). Torregrotta [Torregrotta] (in Italian). Messina: Editoriale Centonove.
- Pandolfo, Pippo (2002). Torregrotta, finestra sul mare di Ulisse [Torregrotta, window on Ulysses' sea] (in Italian). Palermo: Krea.
- Basile, P. Nino (2007). San Paolino di Nola, Patrono di Torregrotta [Saint Paulinus of Nola, Patron of Torregrotta] (in Italian). Torregrotta: Parrocchia San Paolino V.
- Saporetti, Claudio (2008). Diana Facellina. Un mistero Siciliano [Diana Facellina: A Sicilian mystery] (in Italian). Marina di Patti: Editrice Pungitopo. ISBN 978-88-89244-22-7.
- Scoglio, Guglielmo (2013). Enigmi Siciliani [Sicilian Enigmas] (in Italian). Firenze: Phasar Edizioni. ISBN 978-88-6358-205-5.
- Micale, Antonino (2011). San Pier Niceto, avvenimenti e personaggi [San Pier Niceto, events and figures] (in Italian). Media Editoriale. ISBN 978-88-905992-2-4.
- Gazzara, Piero (2006). "La donazione di Re Guglielmo II" [The donation of King William II]. Archivio Storico Romettese [Rometta Historical Archive] (in Italian). Vol. 1. Trento: Editrice UNI service. ISBN 978-88-88859-84-2.
- Scoglio, Guglielmo (2007). Monforte S.G. e il suo territorio nel medioevo [Monforte S.G. and its territory in the Middle Ages] (in Italian). Vol. parte seconda. Trento: Editrice UNI service. ISBN 978-88-6178-049-1.
- Di Vita, Giuseppe (1906). Dizionario geografico dei comuni della Sicilia e delle frazioni comunali: con notizie storiche [Geographical dictionary of Sicilian municipalities and municipal fractions: with historical notes] (in Italian). Palermo: ediz. F. Pravatà.
- Ministeri, Michele (2009). Progetto di massima del P.R.G. - Relazione tecnica [Preliminary P.R.G. Project - Technical Report] (PDF) (in Italian). Comune di Torregrotta. Archived from the original (PDF) on November 5, 2016.
- Maimone, Andrea (1993). Studio agricolo forestale del territorio comunale [Agricultural and forestry study of the municipal territory] (PDF) (in Italian). Comune di Torregrotta.
- Pinizzotto, Vincenzo (2005). Studio geologico-tecnico a supporto del P.R.G. [Geological-technical study in support of the P.R.G.] (PDF) (in Italian). Comune di Torregrotta.
- Crisafulli, Mario. Aspetti storici, etno-antropologici, e naturalistici presso le foci del Muto e del Niceto [Historical, ethno-anthropological, and naturalistic aspects at the mouths of the Muto and Niceto] (in Italian). Legambiente Tirreno.
- Various authors (2004). Bacino idrografico della fiumara di Niceto [Niceto River hydrographic basin] (in Italian). Regione Siciliana.
