= Valdina =

- Comune
- Comune di Valdina
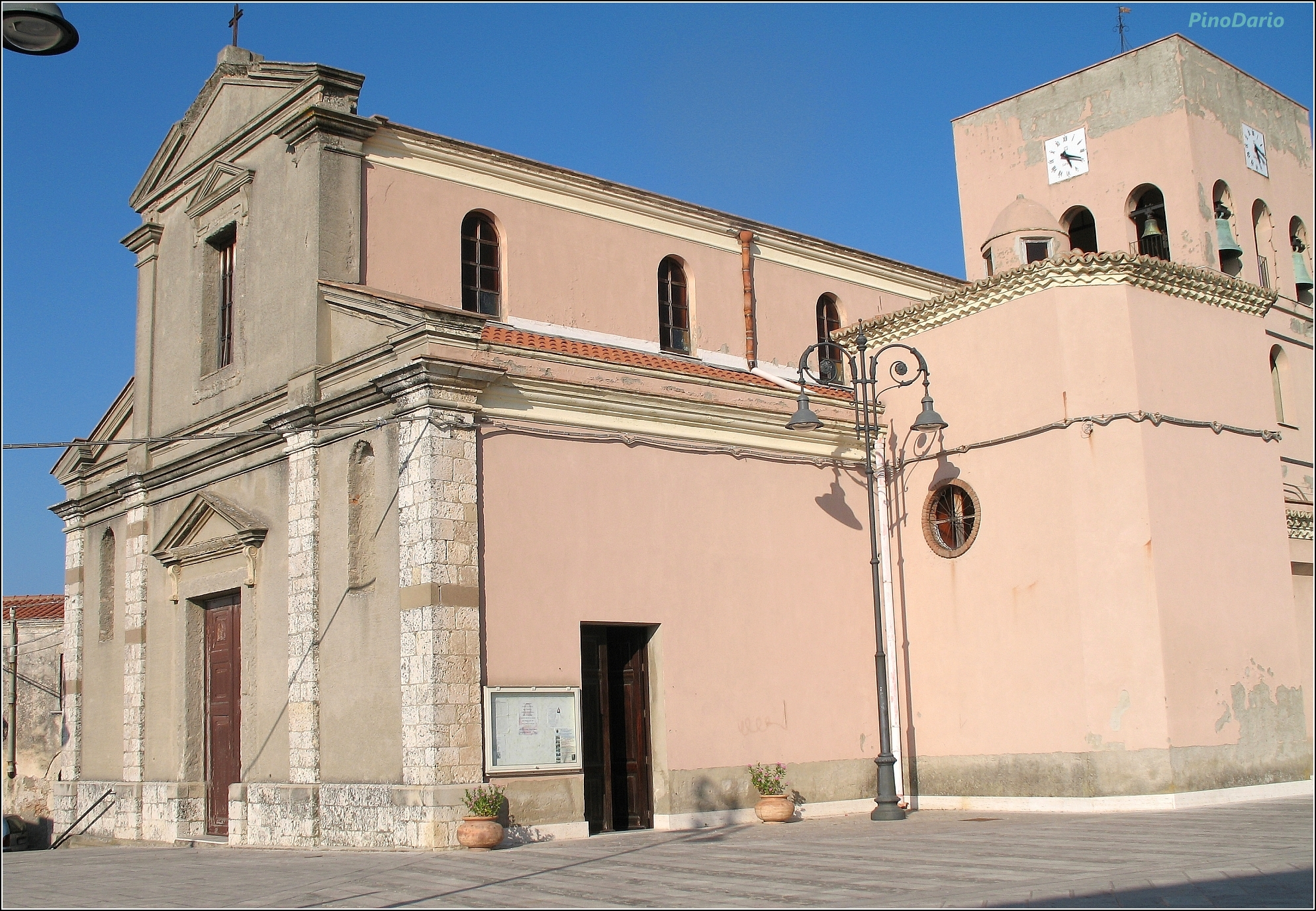
- Church of San Pancrazio.

- Location within Italy Location within Sicily
- Coordinates: 38°12′N 15°22′E
- Country: Italy
- Region: Sicily
- Metropolitan city: Messina (ME)

Government
  - Mayor: Gianfranco Picciotto

Area
  - Total: 2.8 km^{2} (1.1 sq mi)
- Elevation: 213 m (699 ft)

Population (31 January 2014)
  - Total: 1,340
  - Density: 480/km^{2} (1,200/sq mi)
- Demonym: Valdinesi
- Time zone: UTC+1 (CET)
  - Summer (DST): UTC+2 (CEST)
- Postal code: 98040
- Dialing code: 090
- Website: Official website

Valdina (Sicilian: Vaddina) is a comune (municipality) in the Metropolitan City of Messina in the Italian region Sicily, located about 180 kilometres (110 mi) east of Palermo and about 15 kilometres (9 mi) west of Messina.

Valdina borders the following municipalities: Roccavaldina, Torregrotta, Venetico.

== See also ==
- History of Torregrotta
