= Roccavaldina =

Roccavaldina Ροκκαβάλντινα (Greek)
- Comune
- Comune di Roccavaldina
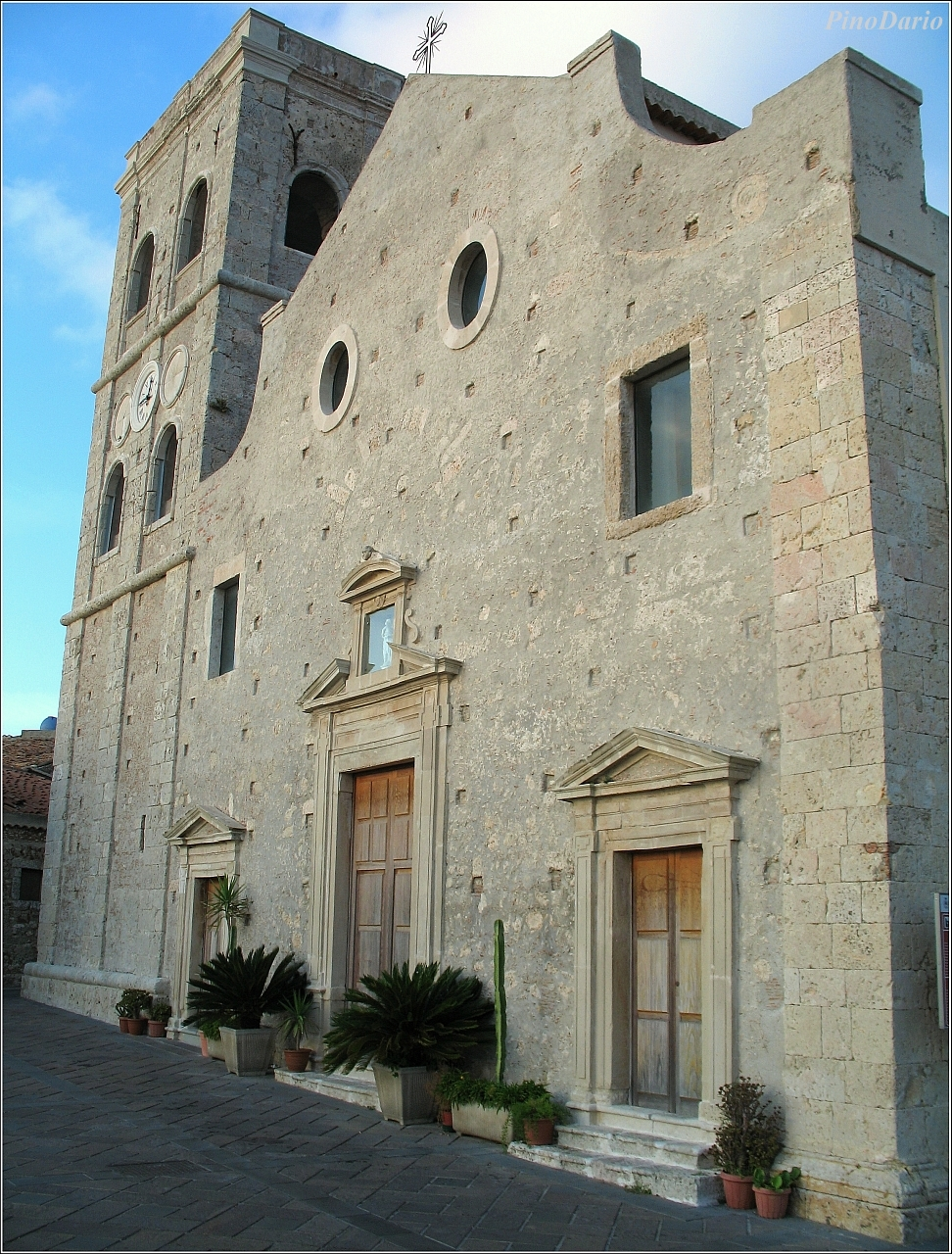
- Cathedral church.

- Location within Italy Location within Sicily
- Coordinates: 38°11′N 15°22′E
- Country: Italy
- Region: Sicily
- Metropolitan city: Messina (ME)
- Frazioni: Cardà, San Salvatore

Government
  - Mayor: Salvatore Visalli

Area
  - Total: 6.5 km^{2} (2.5 sq mi)
- Elevation: 320 m (1,050 ft)

Population (30 March 2012)
  - Total: 1,149
  - Density: 180/km^{2} (460/sq mi)
- Demonym: Roccesi
- Time zone: UTC+1 (CET)
  - Summer (DST): UTC+2 (CEST)
- Postal code: 98040
- Dialing code: 090
- Website: Official website

Roccavaldina (Sicilian: Roccavaddina) is a comune (municipality) in the Metropolitan City of Messina in the Italian region Sicily, located about 180 kilometres (110 mi) east of Palermo and about 15 kilometres (9 mi) west of Messina.

Roccavaldina borders the following municipalities: Monforte San Giorgio, Rometta, Spadafora, Torregrotta, Valdina, Venetico.

== See also ==
- History of Torregrotta
