= List of presidents of the Province of Macerata =

President of the Province of Macerata
- Presidente della Provincia di Macerata
- Incumbent; Alessandro Gentilucci since 16 March 2026
- Term length: 4 years
- Inaugural holder: Tarquinio Gentili
- Formation: 1889

The president of the Province of Macerata is the head of the provincial government in Macerata, Marche, Italy. The president oversees the administration of the province, coordinates the activities of the municipalities, and represents the province in regional and national matters.

Since March 2026, the office has been held by Alessandro Gentilucci of Brothers of Italy.

== List ==
=== Presidents of the Provincial Deputation (1889–1926) ===
No.	Portrait	Name	Term start	Term end	Party
1		Tarquinio Gentili	1889	1893	?
2		Martino Bartolazzi	1894	1916 ?	?

=== Presidents of the Province (1951–present) ===
No.	Portrait	Name	Term start	Term end	Party	Election
1		Tommaso Martello	1951	1956	Christian Democracy	1951
1		Tommaso Martello	1956	1960	Christian Democracy	1956
2		Azzolino Pazzaglia	1960	1964	Christian Democracy	1960
2		Azzolino Pazzaglia	1964	1970	Christian Democracy	1964
3		Giancarlo Quagliani	1970	1975	Christian Democracy	1970
4		Otello Di Stefani	1975	1980	Christian Democracy	1975
4		Otello Di Stefani	1980	1985	Christian Democracy	1980
5		Nicola Mancioli	2 August 1985	26 July 1990	Christian Democracy	1985
6		Luigi Sileoni	26 July 1990	8 May 1995	Christian Democracy	1990
7		Sauro Pigliapoco	8 May 1995	14 June 1999	Democratic Party of the Left; Democrats of the Left	1995
7		Sauro Pigliapoco	14 June 1999	28 June 2004	Democratic Party of the Left; Democrats of the Left	1999
8		Giulio Silenzi	28 June 2004	11 June 2009	Democrats of the Left; Democratic Party	2004
9		Franco Capponi	11 June 2009	21 June 2010	The People of Freedom	2009
–		Sandro Calvosa	21 June 2010	1 June 2011	Prefectural commissioner	—
10		Antonio Pettinari	1 June 2011	29 August 2016	Union of the Centre	2011
10		Antonio Pettinari	29 August 2016	19 December 2021	Union of the Centre	2016
11		Sandro Parcaroli	19 December 2021	16 March 2026	Lega per Salvini Premier	2021
12		Alessandro Gentilucci	16 March 2026	Incumbent	Brothers of Italy	2026

== Sources ==
- "Storia amministrativa dell'ente". Ministero dell'Interno.
- Menichini, Piera (2005). "I presidenti delle Province dall'Unità alla Grande guerra: repertorio analitico". Storia Amministrazione Costituzione (13): 260–261.
