= Province of Macerata =

Province of Italy

Coordinates: 43°18′0.90″N 13°27′11.89″E

Province of Macerata Provincia di Macerata (Italian)
- Province
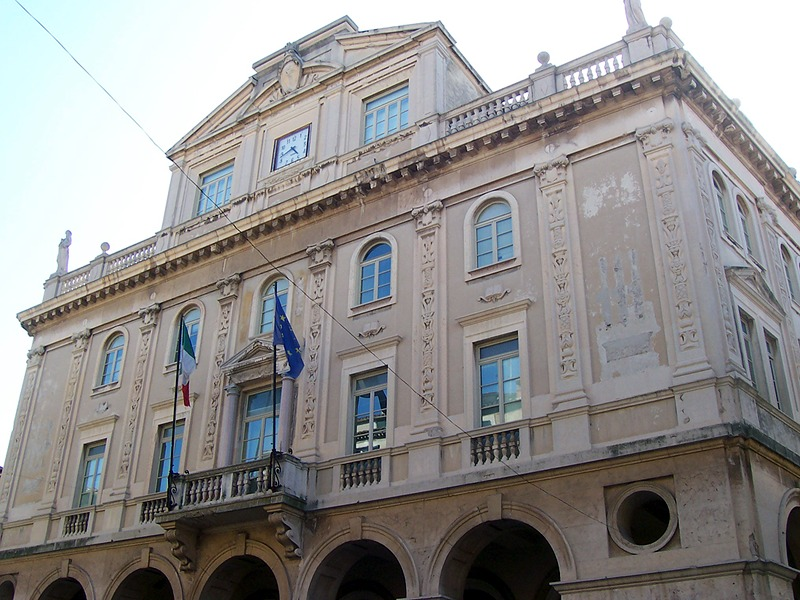
- Palazzo degli Studi, the provincial seat

- Coat of arms

- Location of the province of Macerata in Italy
- Country: Italy
- Region: Marche
- Capital(s): Macerata
- Municipalities: 55

Government
  - President: Alessandro Gentilucci

Area
  - Total: 2,779.34 km^{2} (1,073.11 sq mi)

Population (2026)
  - Total: 301,689
  - Density: 108.547/km^{2} (281.135/sq mi)

GDP
  - Total: €7.866 billion (2015)
  - Per capita: €24,496 (2015)
- Time zone: UTC+1 (CET)
  - Summer (DST): UTC+2 (CEST)
- Postal code: 62100
- Telephone prefix: 0733
- Vehicle registration: MC
- ISTAT code: 043

The province of Macerata (Italian: provincia di Macerata) is a province in the region of Marche in Italy. Its capital is the city of Macerata, located on a hill between the rivers Potenza and Chienti, both of which originate in the province.

The province has a population of 301,689 in an area of 2,779.34 square kilometres (1,073.11 sq mi) across its 55 municipalities.

The province contains, among the numerous historical sites, the Roman settlement of Helvia Recina, destroyed by orders of Alaric I, King of the Visigoths, in 408. The province was part of the Papal States from 1445 (with an interruption during the French invasion during the Napoleonic Wars), until the unification of Italy in 1860. The University of Macerata was formed in the province in 1260 and was known as the University of the Piceno from 1540, when Pope Paul III issued a bull naming it this. The town of Camerino, home to another historical university, is also located in the region.

Cingoli was founded in the province as Cingulum, also known as "The Balcony of the Marche" due to its views of the surroundings. Tolentino was founded by the Romans as Tolentinum, while Recanati is widely known as the birthplace of poet Giacomo Leopardi. Massimo Girotti, an actor, was born in Mogliano in the province of Macerata.

== Government ==
=== List of presidents ===
No.	Portrait	Name	Term start	Term end	Party	Election
1		Tommaso Martello	1951	1956	Christian Democracy	1951
1		Tommaso Martello	1956	1960	Christian Democracy	1956
2		Azzolino Pazzaglia	1960	1964	Christian Democracy	1960
2		Azzolino Pazzaglia	1964	1970	Christian Democracy	1964
3		Giancarlo Quagliani	1970	1975	Christian Democracy	1970
4		Otello Di Stefani	1975	1980	Christian Democracy	1975
4		Otello Di Stefani	1980	1985	Christian Democracy	1980
5		Nicola Mancioli	2 August 1985	26 July 1990	Christian Democracy	1985
6		Luigi Sileoni	26 July 1990	8 May 1995	Christian Democracy	1990
7		Sauro Pigliapoco	8 May 1995	14 June 1999	Democratic Party of the Left Democrats of the Left	1995
7		Sauro Pigliapoco	14 June 1999	28 June 2004	Democratic Party of the Left Democrats of the Left	1999
8		Giulio Silenzi	28 June 2004	11 June 2009	Democrats of the Left Democratic Party	2004
9		Franco Capponi	11 June 2009	21 June 2010	The People of Freedom	2009
–		Sandro Calvosa	21 June 2010	1 June 2011	Prefectural commissioner	—
10		Antonio Pettinari	1 June 2011	29 August 2016	Union of the Centre	2011
10		Antonio Pettinari	29 August 2016	19 December 2021	Union of the Centre	2016
11		Sandro Parcaroli	19 December 2021	16 March 2026	Lega per Salvini Premier	2021
12		Alessandro Gentilucci	16 March 2026	Incumbent	Brothers of Italy	2026

=== Municipalities ===
The province has 55 municipalities:

- Apiro
- Appignano
- Belforte del Chienti
- Bolognola
- Caldarola
- Camerino
- Camporotondo di Fiastrone
- Castelraimondo
- Castelsantangelo sul Nera
- Cessapalombo
- Cingoli
- Civitanova Marche
- Colmurano
- Corridonia
- Esanatoglia
- Fiastra
- Fiuminata
- Gagliole
- Gualdo
- Loro Piceno
- Macerata
- Matelica
- Mogliano
- Monte Cavallo
- Monte San Giusto
- Monte San Martino
- Montecassiano
- Montecosaro
- Montefano
- Montelupone
- Morrovalle
- Muccia
- Penna San Giovanni
- Petriolo
- Pieve Torina
- Pioraco
- Poggio San Vicino
- Pollenza
- Porto Recanati
- Potenza Picena
- Recanati
- Ripe San Ginesio
- San Ginesio
- San Severino Marche
- Sant'Angelo in Pontano
- Sarnano
- Sefro
- Serrapetrona
- Serravalle di Chienti
- Tolentino
- Treia
- Urbisaglia
- Ussita
- Valfornace
- Visso

== Demographics ==
As of 2026, the population is 301,689, of which 49.1% are male, and 50.9% are female. Minors make up 14.2% of the population, and seniors make up 27.2%.

Historical population

Year	Pop.	±%
1861	239,282	—
1871	250,138	+4.5%
1881	250,368	+0.1%
1901	269,505	+7.6%
1911	272,719	+1.2%
1921	285,134	+4.6%
1931	285,850	+0.3%
1936	290,057	+1.5%

Year	Pop.	±%
1951	300,972	+3.8%
1961	291,412	−3.2%
1971	286,155	−1.8%
1981	292,932	+2.4%
1991	295,481	+0.9%
2001	301,523	+2.0%
2011	319,607	+6.0%
2021	304,986	−4.6%

Source: ISTAT

=== Immigration ===
As of 2025, immigrants make up 13.7% of the population. The 5 largest foreign countries of birth are Romania, Albania, Pakistan, North Macedonia, and Morocco.
