= History of Torregrotta =

History of the municipality of Torregrotta, Italy

The history of Torregrotta begins in Roman times with the formation of the first latifundia and encompasses the historical and social events that have taken place up to the present day within the municipal territory and are closely related to it. Since the Middle Ages and throughout the modern age the area was subject to the jurisdiction of the fief of Santa Maria della Scala and, to a lesser extent, that of Rocca. The predominantly peasant population concentrated in the hamlet of the Scala fief, abandoning it beginning in the 14th century. The modern town came into existence only in the early 1500s when the hamlet was rebuilt at the behest of Emperor Charles V and developed over the following centuries. With the dissolution of the fiefdoms following the administrative reforms of the Bourbons, the hamlet, called Torre, and its possessions came under the control of the Municipality of Roccavaldina. Beginning in the second half of the nineteenth century, the social and economic development of Torre, which by then had become Torregrotta, caused a series of contrasts with Roccavaldina, first in the religious and then in the civil sphere, culminating in the administrative split of the two communities in 1923.

== Ancient Age ==
Artemisio and the myth of the cows of the Sun

In Line XII of the Odyssey, Homer relates that Odysseus, after facing Scylla and Charybdis, landed on the island of Trinacria. There his companions, ignoring the warnings they had received from Tiresias and Circe, captured and killed for food some cattle from the sacred herd of the sun god Helios. The episode is spatially related to the short stretch of Sicilian coastline between Giammoro and Venetico, including that of Torregrotta, at which the phenomenon of Purgamenta i.e., the deposition on beaches of dark-colored seaweed occurs annually in several episodes. Pliny the Elder wrote about this natural manifestation, who, reiterating what Seneca had previously asserted, states that:

Between Messina and Milazzo, manure-like filth is thrown back onto the beach, from which the legend of the Sun god's oxen grazing is said to have been derived.

— Pliny the Elder, Naturalis historia, II, 98

Latin authors believed that a temple dedicated to Diana (Artemis for the Greeks) under the title of Facellina, whose cult was among the most important in Sicily, also stood in this area, and that adjacent to it was the small town of Artemisio in which, according to the Roman historian Appian of Alexandria:

[...] it is said that those were the cows of the Sun and that Odysseus was sleeping.

— Appian of Alexandria, De bellis civilibus, V, 484

A quote by Vibius Sequester, who tells about the river, has also aroused interest among historians:

Fetelino, near Peloro, bordering the temple of Diana.

— Vibius Sequester, De fluminibus, 124

Over the centuries, various scholars have advanced various hypotheses, often harshly criticized, about the location of the sacred complex to Diana and the Fetelino River; the latter is identified by many historians as the Niceto stream, in whose vicinity it is believed Artemisio and the temple connected to it should have been located. However, the lack of irrefutable archaeological evidence has not made it possible to establish the exact location, nor to rule out the possibility that Torregrotta may be the site of ancient Artemisio, which historians believe may be located either just below a more recent settlement, which has covered and obliterated the ancient settlement, or below a deep soil cover.

=== Hypotheses on early settlements ===
No archaeological finds have ever been officially discovered in the Torregrotta territory that could attest to the existence of settled human groups during ancient times. However, in the early 1990s, persistent rumors were reported about the discovery of several objects of probable Greek origin, perhaps belonging to a funerary set, found during a foundation excavation which then mysteriously disappeared. The hypothesis of historiographers is that already in pre-Hellenic times there was human habitation in the area. This could be evidenced by the remains of Sicanian tombs: it was customary among this population to bury corpses in caves carved into the rock, similar to those found in the portion of the hillside between Torregrotta and the hamlet of Cardà in the municipality of Roccavaldina. Similar ravines are also found in the neighboring municipalities of Monforte San Giorgio and San Pier Niceto. The Sicanians were replaced by the Sicels and later by the Greeks.

During the Greek-Sicilian period it is agreed that in the territory of the Torregrotta plain, along the entire course of the Niceto stream and on Torregrotta soil itself, there were small rural peasant settlements. A clue to this is an archaeological discovery that took place in 1949 in the Annunziata district of the neighboring municipality of Monforte San Giorgio, where several silver and bronze coins were found dating indicatively to 339 B.C. and today preserved at the archaeological museum in Syracuse. Furthermore, there is evidence that even before 396 B.C. large quantities of agricultural products were already arriving at the port of Messina and that these came from the northeastern hinterland of Sicily. Agricultural activity in the area is also justified by the fact that the valley's soils were particularly fertile due to the abundance of water provided by the Niceto.

=== Roman latifundia ===
With the Roman conquest, which took place in 260 B.C. after the Battle of Mylae, the coastal part underwent a process of land reclamation and deforestation mainly due to military purposes. In 210 B.C., work was started on the construction of the Via Valeria, which, roughly tracing the current route of State Road 113, allowed the transit of large chariots and war machines. After the Second Punic War, latifundia were formed in the territory of the present-day municipality, with the very probable creation of a permanent housing settlement. The entire area, including both Torregrotta's soil and that of other present-day neighboring municipalities, was named Lavina after the watercourse, now only a small stream, which flows on the edge of Torregrotta and which, according to historians' hypotheses, was for a long time among the most important in the surrounding area, especially from the economic point of view. Deforestation also continued with the introduction of cereal crops, vines, olive trees and fruit trees. To facilitate transfers of the labor involved in the work, a pagus, or small camp, was founded on a surrounding hill, not far from present-day Roccavaldina. Of the ancient roads used as a route between the Via Valeria, the latifundia and the pagus, a short section of today's Via San Vito remains, which, in the opinion of scholars, "could be traced right back to the period of Roman rule." It is unclear who the owners of the latifundia were. According to some, and this is the case of historian Francesco Ioli, the portion of land surrounding the Lavina Creek was assigned to a tribune since it was the practice to distribute the conquered territories among military leaders who had demonstrated their valor during the war. Historian and writer Angelo Coco, echoing what was argued by Prof. John Wacher, believes instead that the lands went on lease to some wealthy Romans who had offered money to subsidize the expenses of the Hannibalic War.

Two centuries later, in 36 B.C., the famous Battle of Naulochus, decisive in the civil war between Caesar Octavian and Sextus Pompey, took place in the waters in front of Torregrotta. Prior to the battle, Pompey's 300 ships took refuge at Naulochus, an ancient vanished city about which several hypotheses have been made for its exact location.

== Medieval Age ==
=== From Casale del Conte to Rachal Elmelum ===
At the fall of the Western Roman Empire the territory called Lavina, of which the present municipality was part, fell first to the Ostrogoths, who had occupied Sicily in 476, and then to the Byzantines. The area around the Lavina stream was then granted to a tribune and named Casale del Conte (Casale Comitis) in honor of the new landowner who was also a palace courtier of Emperor Justinian I. The hamlet was a small settlement surrounded by a vast expanse of farmland in which villagers devoted to cultivating the land lived. Under the Byzantine Empire there were several centuries of peace and stability until 827 when the invasion of Sicily began by the Saracens who reached Casale del Conte only around the year 870. The Arabs, who imported the customs and traditions of their place of origin, razed the Casale to the ground and settled in what is now the Torregrotta district of Radali, on the top of a hill overlooking the present-day town, as they preferred the low elevations near the rivers. The whole area was renamed Rachal Elmelum or more likely Rahl el Melum, a term closely related to Radali that is a clear linguistic evolution of the original Rahl, a term used to denote small inhabited localities, which later turned into Rachal, Racchal, Ragali and finally into the present word. The village of Radali was made up of small houses made of stone, mud and straw, often formed by a single communal room for men and animals, while in the surrounding fields and orchards irrigation was widely used, and, according to tradition, sbergia peaches were first cultivated.

=== The fiefdom of Santa Maria della Scala ===
Islamic rule lasted until 1061 when the Normans led by Roger of Hauteville initiated the conquest of Sicily. The new rulers, of the Christian faith, in order to facilitate the religious conversion of the population, encouraged the establishment of monasteries to which they also dispensed large rural portions of territory. This was the reason why, in March 1168, the Norman King of Sicily William II, still 15 years old, and his mother Queen Margaret of Navarre granted and donated to the Benedictine monastery of Santa Maria della Scala in Messina the ancient Byzantine hamlet:

[…] Casale quod dicitur Comitis et Saracenie vocatur Rachal Elmelum, situm in plano Milatii inter Montefortem et Ramet versus mare […]
[...] Hamlet of the Count, called by the Saracens Rachal Elmelum, located in the plain of Milazzo between Monforte and Rometta towards the sea [...]

— Grant document of William II dated March 1168

The donation, also reconfirmed later by Emperor Henry VI, represented the birth of the fief of Santa Maria della Scala, or simply Scala fief, which, however, was given this name only in later centuries. The fief included the present-day hamlets Fondachello and Tracoccia of the Municipality of Valdina and most of the territory of Torregrotta, from the coast to approximately today's Via Libertà, that is, near the former Kindergarten building. From the latter street, towards the south, extended the royal property of Rametta (today's Rometta), which included all the territories between the Gallo stream and the Muto stream. In the territories of the hamlet, due to the "professional manpower" who lived here since earlier times but whose actual numerical extent is unknown, agricultural production was promptly started without the investment of large sums of money. Benedictine nuns were also exempted from paying tributes, which were usually mandatory for those who received donations from the ruler. On January 13, 1196, Queen Constance, to avert the hamlet being taken away from the nuns, reconfirmed the donation made by her two predecessors by extending the boundaries to Niceta's vast estate. The latter was located in the present-day municipality of Monforte San Giorgio and was brought as a dowry to the monastery by a nun named Maria. Frederick II, the first King of Sicily of the Swabian dynasty and son of Constance, also confirmed the previous donations in August 1209, when he was still a minor. Frederick himself, having now come of age, during an assembly held in Capua in 1220, ordered the revocation of all the privileges he had granted up to that time since many of them had been extorted by mystification and deception. Therefore, on July 11, 1221, after receiving the nuns Margaret and Catherine and viewing the documents sent by Abbess Barbara, he reconfirmed for the second time the bestowal of the Casale Comitis to the nuns of Santa Maria della Scala. Later, at a time when relations between the papacy and Frederick II were openly hostile due to the latter's excommunication, the ruler allowed the church's property to be plundered; thus a judge from Messina, Afranione de Porta, taking advantage of the situation seized the Scala fiefdom, whose ownership later passed to his son Bartolomeo. Upon the emperor's death, the Casale was occupied by a group of Messinians until, on June 10, 1267, the papal legate in Sicily, Cardinal Rodolfo de Chevrières, sent to the island to reinstate the ecclesiastical property robbed by the secular feudal lords, issued a sentence in which he stipulated the restitution of the fief to the legitimate owners. Meanwhile, the installation of the new King Charles I of Anjou in 1266 had opened the brief Angevin period during which the nuns of the monastery of Santa Maria della Scala failed to return possession of the Casale: the sovereign, in fact, simulated approving the rulings but did not order their actual implementation. In the uncertainty, the Casale was again usurped by the judge's nephew Afranione de Porta.

After the Sicilian Vespers of 1282, the throne of Sicily was claimed by Peter III, inaugurating the period of the Aragonese dynasty. On April 3, 1289, during the reign of James II of Aragon, the judges of Monforte, Bonsignorino de Neapoli and Joannes de Peretti, redelivered the Casale to the nuns of Santa Maria della Scala, as a result of a ruling of the Magna Regia Curia and 22 years after that of Cardinal de Chevrières.

=== The fiefdom of Rocca and the historic division ===
In the early 14th century, the new king of Sicily Frederick III granted part of the western domain of Rometta to the Pisan knight Giovanni La Rocca and the Genoese Giovanni Mauro, both of whom were his staunch supporters. The two feudal lords constituted two new fiefdoms and within them built hamlets that were given the names of their respective owners: Rocca (today's Roccavaldina) and Maurojanni (today's Valdina). The latter was later aggregated with the former forming a single fiefdom. The fiefdom of Rocca included the extreme southern portion of the present-day Torregrotta territory, which, starting in the 14th century, thus saw the presence of two distinct properties: on the one hand, the aforementioned Casale del Conte, administered by the Messina monastery of Santa Maria della Scala, and on the other, the land of Rocca. The exact dividing boundary between the two estates is somewhat uncertain: historians have speculated that it was either via Bucceri (today's via Mezzasalma) or it was at the height of the former Kindergarten building. However, in the Torregrotta historical center there are two adjacent areas called Baron and Badessa, evidence of the historical division. During the Aragonese period the fief of Rocca was administered by various feudal lords: Giovanni La Rocca was replaced by Nicolò Castagna and then the Pollicino family. The fief of Santa Maria della Scala, on the other hand, experienced a period of depopulation and abandonment that, according to historians' hypotheses, was brought about by a number of causes: the Black Death of 1347, the cancellation in 1421 of feudal donations to the monasteries following the enactment of the Royal Constitution of Alfonso V of Aragon, and lastly the raids of Muslim pirates who, starting in the mid-15th century, plundered the Sicilian coasts.

== Modern Age ==
=== The rebirth of the hamlet ===
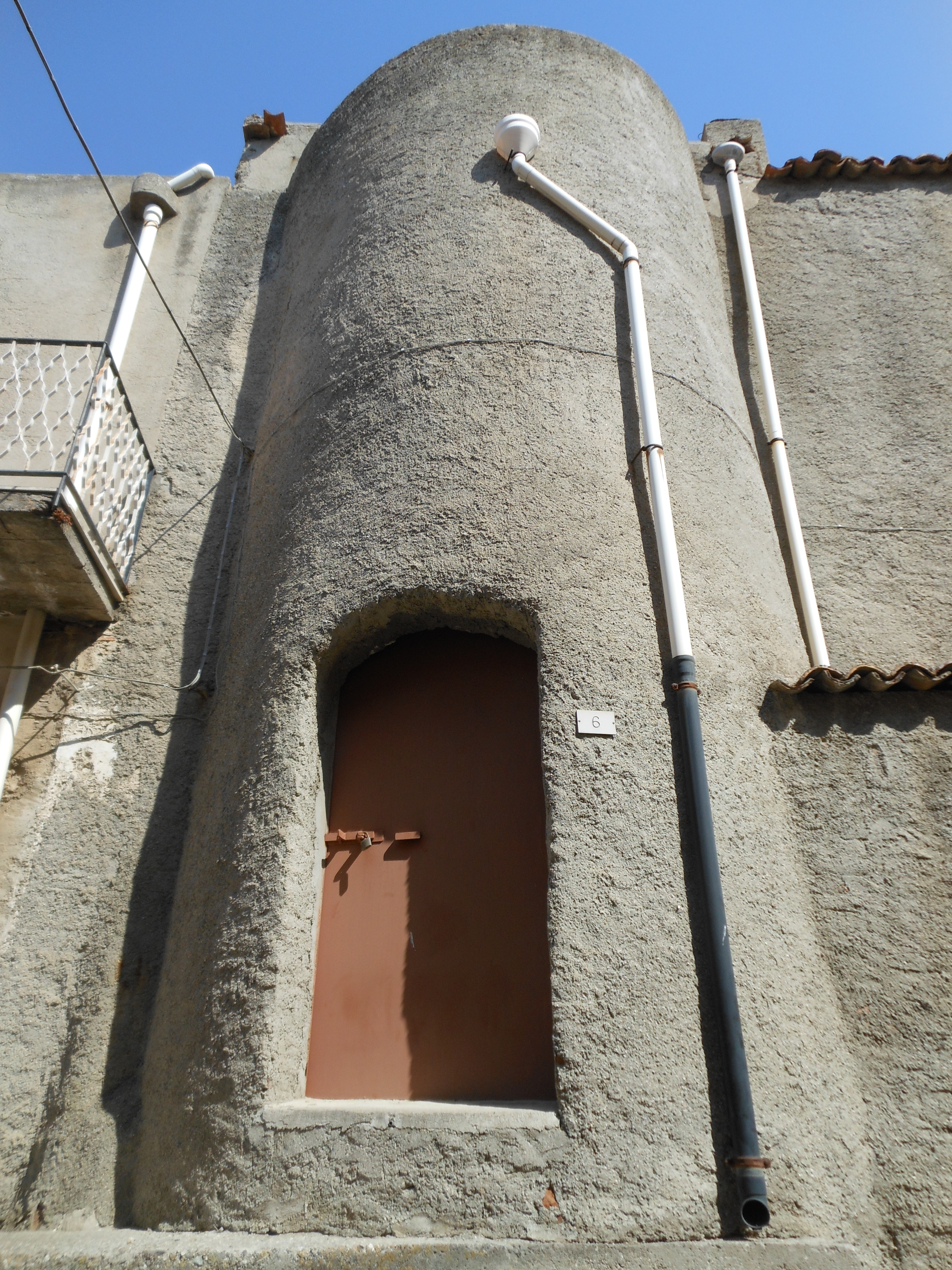
The only surviving tower of the 16th-century Castrum is located on Trieste Street, incorporated into houses of later periods

The 16th century, while the Aragonese dynasty was still reigning, began with a strong earthquake in 1505 that caused a lot of damage and destroyed many houses. The lord of the Hamlet of Rocca, Gilberto Pollicino, tried to revive the fortunes of the fief but due to economic straits, on June 15, 1509, he was forced to sell the lands of Rocca and Maurojanni to the Spanish nobleman Andrea Valdina, who would later become, during the Spanish period of Sicily, Master Notary of the Grand Court and Captain of Arms. In 1516, with the accession of Charles V to the throne, the island was incorporated into the crown of Castile.

Meanwhile, the Casale del Conte lay in ruins, but on October 9, 1526, Emperor Charles V issued a Licentia populandi in which, accepting the request sent to him by the nuns of the monastery of Santa Maria della Scala, authorized the rebuilding and repopulation of the ancient hamlet in the Scala fief. The document, drafted and approved in the Spanish city of Granada, was first recorded in Palermo on May 6, 1527 and then in Rometta by the Jurors on August 12 of the same year. In order to protect the new inhabitants especially from the actions of Turkish pirates, the license also provided for the construction of defensive works, namely a castrum or tower, and granted the nuns the possibility of taxing the population of the fief at their own discretion. The expectation of being able to improve their living conditions fostered the immigration of destitute people from the surrounding area who, settling in the renewed reality, quickly created a community with its own identity. The rebirth of the hamlet represented the origin of the modern town whose aforementioned 16th-century nucleus grew larger and developed over the centuries, first being called Torre and then Torregrotta. To better manage the agricultural and economic activities, the nuns entrusted the administration of the entire fief to a lay procurator (conduttor) who, like the feudal nobles, became a figure of considerable power since he was the sole trustee and representative of the monastery. The position was first held by an inhabitant of Maurojanni, Don Sebastiano Barnava, and later by his son Francesco, who took over the role upon his father's death in 1587.

=== The economy of the fiefdom in the 16th and 17th centuries ===
Beginning in the second half of the 16th century, a number of commercial and artisanal structures were established within the estates of the Scala fiefdom. Along the Dromo (today's State Road 113), near today's Piazza Santa Maria della Scala was active the Fondaco della Scala, a building similar to modern motels in which merchants and wayfarers made brief stops for refreshments or overnight stays during their travels. The fondaco also had a defensive function as it was equipped with a watchtower. In today's Contrada Maddalena, on the other hand, a rural settlement arose and developed that was a religious center devoted to the worship of St. Mary Magdalene but also a production nucleus where, due to the clay soil, bricks were made, mainly tiles. Of no less importance was agricultural activity with abundant production of oil and wine. Agriculture constituted the main economic source of the entire fief during the 16th and 17th centuries, a period during which traditional orchards and valley crops of wheat and fallow were replaced by large expanses of vineyards. Olive groves, widespread in the clay soils of the hills, were also joined by mulberry trees whose leaves were used to raise silkworms used in silk production. The areas where the largest expanses of mulberry groves were concentrated were the Maddalena districts in the fief of Santa Maria della Scala and the Grotta district, which fell partly within the fief of Rocca and partly within the fief of La Scala. A significant incentive for silk processing was provided by the Valdinas, barons of Rocca and brilliant entrepreneurs, who started a flourishing and substantial trade in silk products.

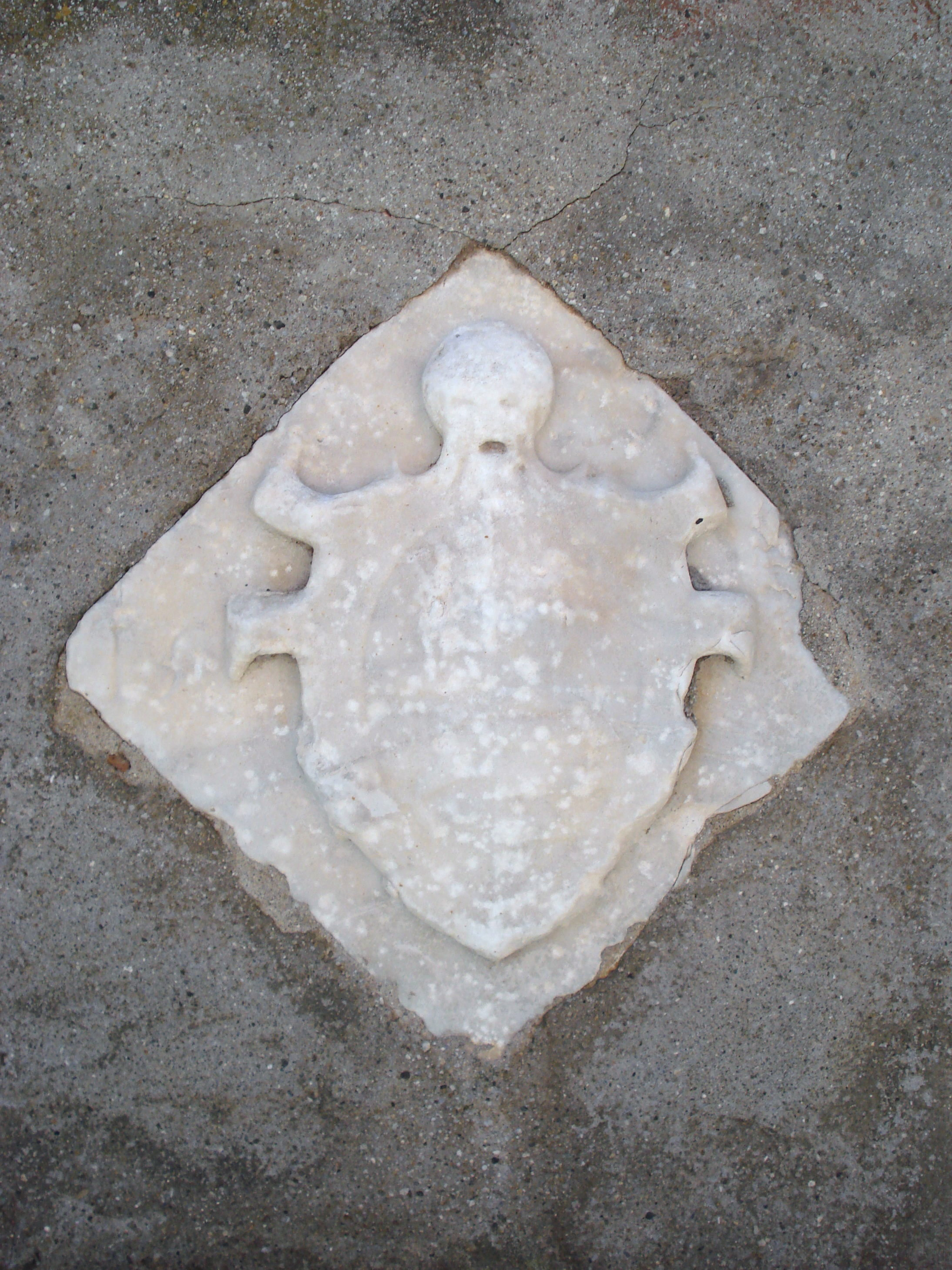
Coat of arms of the Valdina family from the 16th century in the historic center of Torregrotta

=== The Valdinas ===
The entire fiefdom of Rocca experienced its greatest splendor precisely under the leadership of the Valdina family, which lasted until the first half of the 1700s. Upon the death of the progenitor Andrea, he was replaced on November 12, 1578, by Andrea Valdina Juniore, who died in 1589. He was succeeded first by his son Maurizio, who died at the age of only 22, and then by his second son Pietro, who in 1623 modified the fief by naming it Roccavaldina since he had received permission from the sovereign to associate it with the name of his own dynasty. He was also given the title of Marquis and, in 1642, of Prince of the fief of Maurojanni, which became in the same year the Principality of Valdina. In 1660 the estates passed to Pietro's grandson, Giovanni Valdina Vignolo, who died leaving no heirs in 1692. There followed a period of internal disputes within the family that ended in 1703 with the appointment as heir of his cousin Francesco Valdina. The latter sold the title of Prince of Valdina to the Duke of Giampilieri, Giuseppe Papè, beginning the decline of the House that culminated in 1764 when his son, Giovanni Valdina Vhart, had to sell all the noble titles. The next owners were, in order, the Martino, Atanasio, De Spucches and finally Nastasi families, all representatives of the bourgeoisie to which the Valdinas had allied themselves after the decline.

=== The dissolution of the fiefdoms ===
The fiefdom of Santa Maria della Scala continued to be administered by proxies suffering no particular upheaval until 1743, when a plague epidemic devastated Roccavaldina and all the surrounding fiefdoms. A few years earlier, the Kingdom of Sicily had been conquered by Charles of Bourbon, following the brief interludes of Piedmontese and Austrian rule that occurred between 1713 and 1734. The Bourbons tried on several occasions to seize and then resell the ecclesiastical patrimony through emphyteusis. Several attempts at confiscations and alienations, which also involved the Scala fief, took place from 1792 until 1815 but almost all of them were unsuccessful.

In 1812, under pressure from part of the nobility, King Ferdinand IV was forced to grant a constitution that changed the bureaucratic structure of the kingdom and abolished feudal privileges and thus the fiefdoms. With the further administrative reorganization of 1816, the former fiefdom of Roccavaldina was definitively transformed into a municipality, incorporating also the former fiefdom of Santa Maria della Scala; the hamlet, which was already called Torre in the early nineteenth century, became a sub-municipality of Rocca, assuming the definitive toponym Torregrotta towards the middle of the century. However, most of the real estate continued to be the property of the Messina monastery, although subject to municipal jurisdiction.

== Contemporary Age ==
=== The religious issue ===
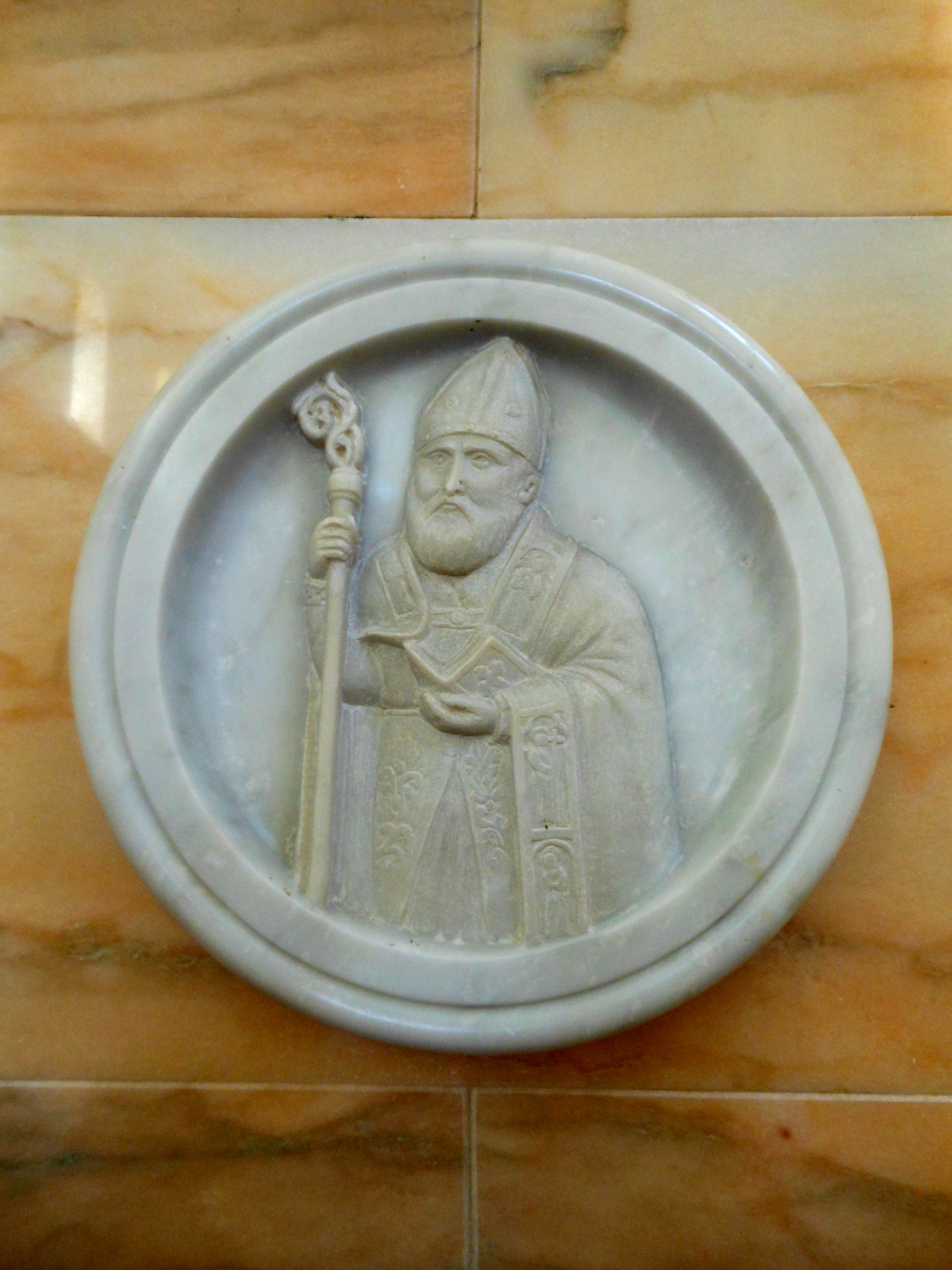
Bas-relief depicting St. Paulinus. Detail of the altar in the Torregrotta church of the same name.

Although no rivalry between the two communities was ever documented in earlier eras, during the nineteenth century the inhabitants of the submunicipality began to resent having to be subordinated to Roccavaldina which was perceived as foreign and detached from the Torregrotta community. The discontent was latent until the middle of the century when the desire for greater autonomy manifested itself in religious instances. The people of Torregrotta had to suffer the inconvenience - when compared to the means of transportation of the time - of traveling to the mother church of the distant Roccavaldina in order to receive the sacraments since the church of Maria SS. della Pietà, present in Torre and dependent on the Roccese clergy, was relegated to the role of a rural building in which only the celebration of the Eucharist could be officiated. Pressed by the insistent demands of the people of Torre, the Royal Bourbon Government was forced to authorize the elevation to the sacramental status of the church of Torre but only for the sacraments of urgency (baptism and extreme unction) and on the condition that the population shouldered the expenses necessary to maintain the institution. The meager contribution offered by the municipality of Rocca was insufficient to reach the necessary sum. Beginning on September 10, 1852, the people of Torre together with the inhabitants of the neighboring villages of Cardà, Casino (today's Monforte Marina) and the hamlet of Benefizio started a fundraiser to be repeated annually, which was followed by the formal act of elevation, produced on October 12, 1852 by the archbishop of Messina, Monsignor Francesco Di Paola. In the same document, the archbishop also decided to change the titular of the church, dedicating it to St. Pauline. However, the religiosity of the people of Torre was still subjected to the strict impositions of the clergy of Rocca, which limited the work of the first priest assigned to the sacramental church, Fr. Giuseppe Ordile, triggering a series of contrasts and controversies with the latter. A triggering factor was the attempt to celebrate two marriages in Torregrotta, which was immediately blocked by the vicar forane of Roccavaldina, but also the written rule that prescribed the inhabitants of Torregrotta to celebrate Easter in the main church of Rocca. The Rocca priests also began to dispute the fee that the municipality paid for the partial sustenance of the church of San Paolino, which was deemed disproportionate to the amount allocated to the mother church. The religious altercation that had flared up became openly hostile in December 1865 while Don Giuseppe Scibilia was chaplain of Torregrotta. The latter, making himself the interpreter of the common sentiment, had taken an autonomist conduct, receiving the admonition of the Capitular Vicar of the Archdiocese of Messina and strong criticism from the priests of Rocca:

Scibilia dares to elevate himself to absolute parish priesthood. He arrogates to himself the right to keep to himself the annual provisional registers of births, deaths and marriages, which should follow that Mother Church, and with genuine boldness he makes use of a seal with the imprint of St. Paulinus, to eliminate completely the idea of the veneration due to the Principal Patron. He, in short, as a simple Chaplain of a Succursal Church, which is what this institution is, intends to emancipate himself from the subjugation that he owes to this Parish, with the pernicious scandal of also emancipating the inhabitants of the Hamlet.

— Excerpt from the letter dated January 27, 1866, sent by the Roccese parish priests to the Capitular Vicar

It is a historically established thesis that it was precisely the fear of emancipation of the people of Torregrotta rather than a convinced religious intransigence that fueled the controversy and oppression on the part of the curates of Rocca. Although in concrete terms the condition of the Torregrotta church remained unchanged, the whole affair fortified the autonomist desire and devotion of the people of Torregrotta around the temple of St. Paulinus.

=== The bourgeoisie of Torregrotta and the agricultural modernization of the 19th century ===
During the nineteenth century Torregrotta experienced a period of gradual population growth and building expansion determined by migratory movements that since the beginning of the century had affected the entire territory of the former Scala fiefdom. The new residents, coming both from the surrounding area and from other parts of Sicily, contributed to the economic renewal by initiating various entrepreneurial activities that stimulated the construction of privately initiated infrastructure. Among the major works carried out in Torre in the nineteenth century should be mentioned: in 1817 the maintenance of the entire Via Maddalena (no longer existing) with the paving of the roadbed, in 1833 the construction of the aqueduct that from the contrada Maddalena ended in Torre and in 1840 the hydraulic containment works of the Bagheria stream that had caused a disastrous flood in the previous year, flooding all the land in the contrada Grotta.

The decades following the Unification of Italy, after the 1860 Expedition of the Thousand had ended the Bourbon period, were characterized by a significant change in the society of Torregrotta. Decisive was Law No. 743, passed by the newly formed Italian Parliament on August 10, 1862, which mandated the confiscation of ecclesiastical land and buildings in Sicily and subsequent alienation through public auctions. The landed properties of the Monastery of Santa Maria della Scala in the former fief of the same name also suffered the same treatment: after the confiscation they were divided into thirty lots, which were alienated bit by bit until January 21, 1867 when the last eight plots were sold at public auction. The public auction sales criterion favored wealthy families who, being able to secure the large tracts of land in the former Scala fiefdom, formed a narrow and influential middle class.

The new landowners - among them the Basile, Sfameni, Lo Mundo and Mezzasalma families - quickly reorganized agricultural activities by initiating the intensive exploitation of the countryside, which at the time consisted of large expanses of vines on the plains and olive groves and mulberry orchards on the hills. The marshy areas adjacent to the coast were reclaimed with the construction of drainage canals (called "saie" by the local population), which, by conveying the water, became veritable irrigation systems. With the reclamation of the coastal area, it was possible to cultivate vines almost up to the beach. New handicraft and trade activities were also created, and the ancient tradition related to the production and sale of silk came back into vogue.

In the renewed economic framework, the condition of the peasants and the working class still remained poor, favoring the spread of the new socialist ideas through the propaganda work of the young Torrese lawyer Salvatore Visalli. The same, in 1892, founded in Torregrotta a workers' union adhering to the revolutionary movement of the Sicilian Fasci that imposed itself on the political scene in Torregrotta despite the opposition of the local consortium and the parish priest of the time. Following the repressive intervention of the national government, all Sicilian fasces were dissolved, including the one in Torregrotta, in 1894. In the same year there was a strong earthquake in southern Calabria, which occurred on the afternoon of November 16, but it did not stop the economic buzz of the turn of the century as damage in Torregrotta was limited only to the oldest buildings.

=== Clashes with Roccavaldina and the war of burials ===
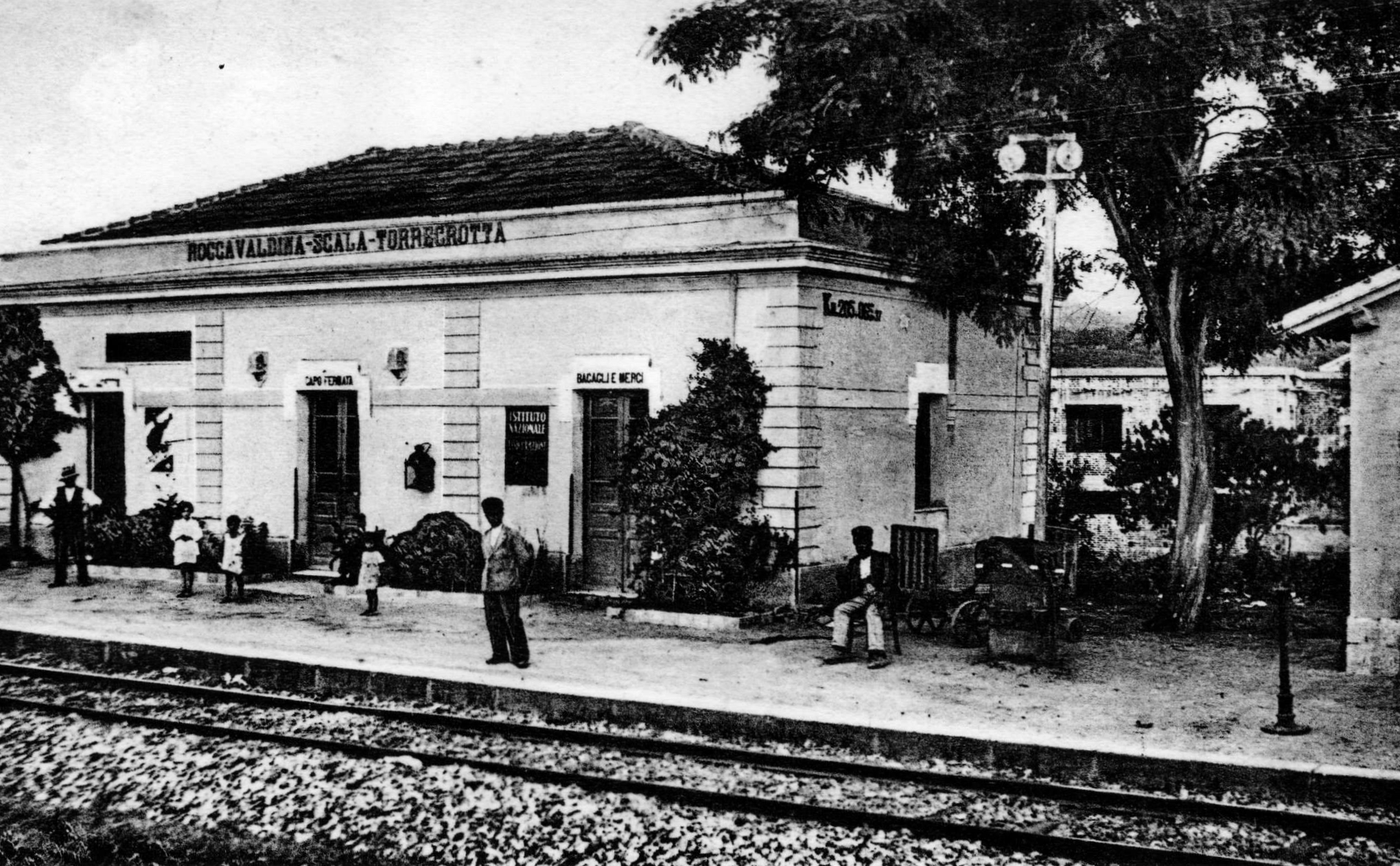
The old Torregrotta station in 1912

By the beginning of the twentieth century, despite the damage caused by the strong Messina earthquake of 1908, Torregrotta had economically outstripped Roccavaldina, becoming the municipal center of productive activities, partly due to the construction of the Palermo-Messina railway and the local train station. New business ventures were created and developed in the historical sector of agriculture, as well as in the field of handicrafts - production of bricks and pipe making - and trade. The Torregrotta bourgeois class, composed by a few large landowners, sought to strengthen its hegemony within the local community by exploiting both the substantial economic power and the impatience of the people of Torregrotta with Roccavaldina. The religious oppression implemented by the Roccese clergy had increased the popular desire that aimed at Torregrotta's autonomy in order to reestablish the separation of the two areas prior to the administrative reform of the Bourbons. The long brooded discontents found vent during World War I when economic hardships, lack of basic necessities and lack of services and infrastructure prompted the bourgeoisie to initiate maneuvers to enfranchise itself from Roccavaldina and to seize political and managerial power in the territory. In 1917 there was an attempted riot by the people of Torregrotta to protest against the division of basic necessities between Roccavaldina and Torregrotta as it was deemed unfair. In addition, the Torrese Committee of Civil Assistance was established, which, although its purpose was to help the families of those called up in World War I, turned into a "movement of political struggle and antagonism to the municipal administrative management of Roccavaldina." In the hostile environment that had been created, the Roccese representatives on September 7, 1919, deserted the unveiling ceremony of the war memorial, which was desired by the aforementioned committee and financed by the people of Torregrotta through fundraising. In 1920 Torregrotta also surpassed Roccavaldina in number of inhabitants, and in 1921 the elevation of the church of San Paolino to parish status was obtained. Having achieved independence from the curates of Roccavaldina, the climate of tension between the two communities eventually resulted in contention and popular strife that went down in history as the war of the burials. The people of Torregrotta could not bear to bury their dead in the distant cemetery of Roccavaldina, having to bear the cost of transportation as well. They then began stealthily exhuming the corpses and transferring them overnight to Torregrotta, triggering the reaction of the people of Roccavaldina. Night patrols of Torregrotta residents were then set up to prevent the bodies from being moved again, coming close to a scuffle with the people of Roccavaldina on more than one occasion. At the same time, in January 1922, it was decided to initiate two fundraisers among all the people of Torregrotta, which were used to build a fence to be used as a cemetery and to end the raids between the opposing factions.

=== Administrative autonomy ===
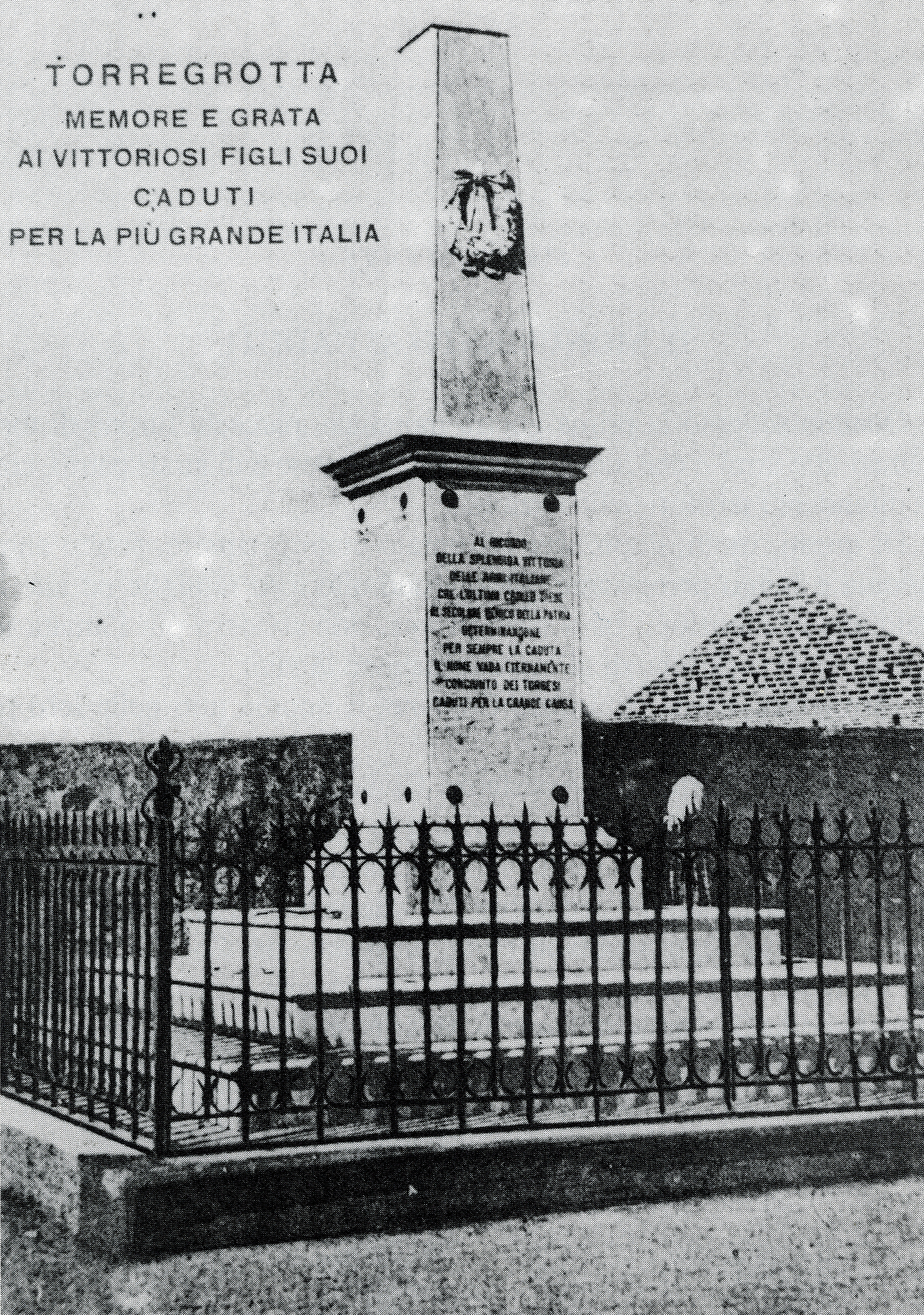
The war memorial in a 1923 postcard

Beginning on August 3, 1917, with the resignation of Roccavaldina's mayor Nicolò Anastasi Foca, a period of political-administrative crisis had begun in the municipal government of Roccavaldina, with the alternation of several prefectural commissioners until 1926. It was impossible to recompose a new administration both because of the resignation of many municipal councilors and because of a bureaucratic apparatus that had been reduced to its minimum by the world war. Taking advantage of the situation, engineer Pietro Mezzasalma, who led the representation of the bourgeois families and was the main architect of Torregrotta's autonomy, obtained the support of various political figures in the Torregrotta autonomist cause. The prefectural commissioner of Roccavaldina, Giuseppe Attilio Muscolino, also communicated in a missive to the prefect that in order to overcome the contrasts between the two communities, the only possible solution was the establishment of the hamlet of Torregrotta as an autonomous municipality. On October 18, 1920, under the signature of Luigi Fulci, a first bill for the autonomy of Torregrotta was presented to the Royal Chamber; the same Fulci, together with Giuseppe Paratore, presented a new bill on the same subject on December 10, 1921, but the document was referred to the Internal Affairs Committee for consideration. This was followed by a further parliamentary initiative by future minister Luigi Facta and on June 8, 1922 a final bill, on the proposal of deputy Giovanni Antonio Colonna di Cesarò, which was also referred to the consideration of the interior committee. Torregrotta's autonomy came on October 21, 1923 when the King of Italy, Victor Emmanuel III, at the proposal of the Prime Minister of the time, decided to decree the establishment of Torregrotta as an autonomous municipality by Royal Decree No. 2333. In the following years, through a lengthy bureaucratic process, dividing boundaries and separation of property with Roccavaldina were defined. The representatives of Torregrotta and the prefectural commissioner of Roccavaldina signed, on June 17, 1926, the map prepared by the Civil Engineering office of Messina, which, officially approved by the King of Italy with Royal Decree No. 2142 of November 25, 1926, attributed the area of territory due to each municipality according to the number of inhabitants at the 1921 census. The people of Torregrotta, however, demanding fair compensation, denounced irregularities in the population estimate, pointing out an anomaly between the 1920 and 1921 surveys in which there was a conspicuous increase in the number of inhabitants of Roccavaldina:

The difference between the two investigations arises from the fact that, while the operations carried out in 1920 by the prefectural envoy were correctly and scrupulously conducted for the ascertainment of the truth, those on the other hand done in 1921 were by the Municipal Authority of the time, resident in Roccavaldina, tacked on for the use and consummation of the idea in that town preponderant - an idea that can be summed up in this wrong concept: "to enlarge in the public plot Roccavaldina, and thereby impoverish Torregrotta."

— Excerpt from the file "For the splitting of the ancient municipality of Roccavaldina into the two new municipalities of Roccavaldina and Torregrotta," 10/05/1924

Thus the territory assigned to Torregrotta turned out to be about 1 square kilometer smaller than what it would have been entitled to by right. Meanwhile, in 1926, the first podestà was appointed and the municipal administrative machine began to operate. However, the unbundling of the cadastre between Torregrotta and Roccavaldina was not achieved until April 20, 1932 while the complete division of property, rights and obligations between the two municipalities had to wait until July 3, 1936.

=== The twenty-year fascist period and World War II ===
The fascist regime stifled freedoms of opinion and demonstration. The municipal government, an expression of the landed bourgeoisie, had to deal with the scarcity of financial resources. Very few public works were carried out, while the most urgent projects - water supply, sewage system, school construction - failed to find adequate financial coverage.

During the government of podestà Mezzasalma, a toll was instituted for three years along the driveable street (present-day Via XXI Ottobre) with a barrier post at the height of Via Crocieri. This tax, required of all vehicles passing on the aforementioned road, was used for the paving of the entire street which had become almost intransitable since it had not been maintained since 1908. Under the leadership of podestà Aurelio Coppolino, who was appointed by the prefect on August 4, 1933, the public lighting system and the municipal palace were built, the foundation stone of which had been laid in 1929. Also, for the first time, a pharmacy service was established. In 1936, podestà Antonino Magno was appointed, who was reappointed to the leadership of the municipality in 1941, but was unable to complete his term due to the collapse of the fascist regime and the occupation of the Allies. The latter, in fact, dismissed all mayors and officials.

During World War II Torregrotta was spared from bombings, and despite the difficulties, the construction of the new church of San Paolino, which was inaugurated on June 29, 1943, was completed. Allied troops, heading toward the mainland, passed through the town on the night of August 16-17, 1943, setting up an encampment in the vicinity of the municipal cemetery throughout the period of military occupation. The Torrese economy was severely damaged by the more general crisis of those years. Only agricultural activities continued while the handicraft and industrial sectors were inactive. Once the war ended, the broader southern phenomenon of emigration to northern Italy and abroad also manifested itself in Torregrotta.

In October 1943 Gaetano Mezzasalma was appointed mayor, who maintained excellent relations with the Allied military administration of the occupied territories but resigned after only a month. He was succeeded by Giuseppe Saladino, appointed by the prefect on December 7, 1943, who had the task of starting the path toward the economic and social recovery of Torregrotta.

=== The post-World War II period: the end of the hegemony of the landed bourgeoisie ===
In October 1946, the first democratic elections were held to elect the town council, which gathered representatives from all walks of life since there was not yet a well-delineated political order in parties and alignments. The civic council elected Giuseppe Saladino as mayor, a person close to the bourgeois families of Torregrotta belonging to the circle of large landowners. Saladino was reappointed mayor after the May 1952 electoral contest which pitted the PCI list against the winning list of the remaining parties of the constitutional arch.

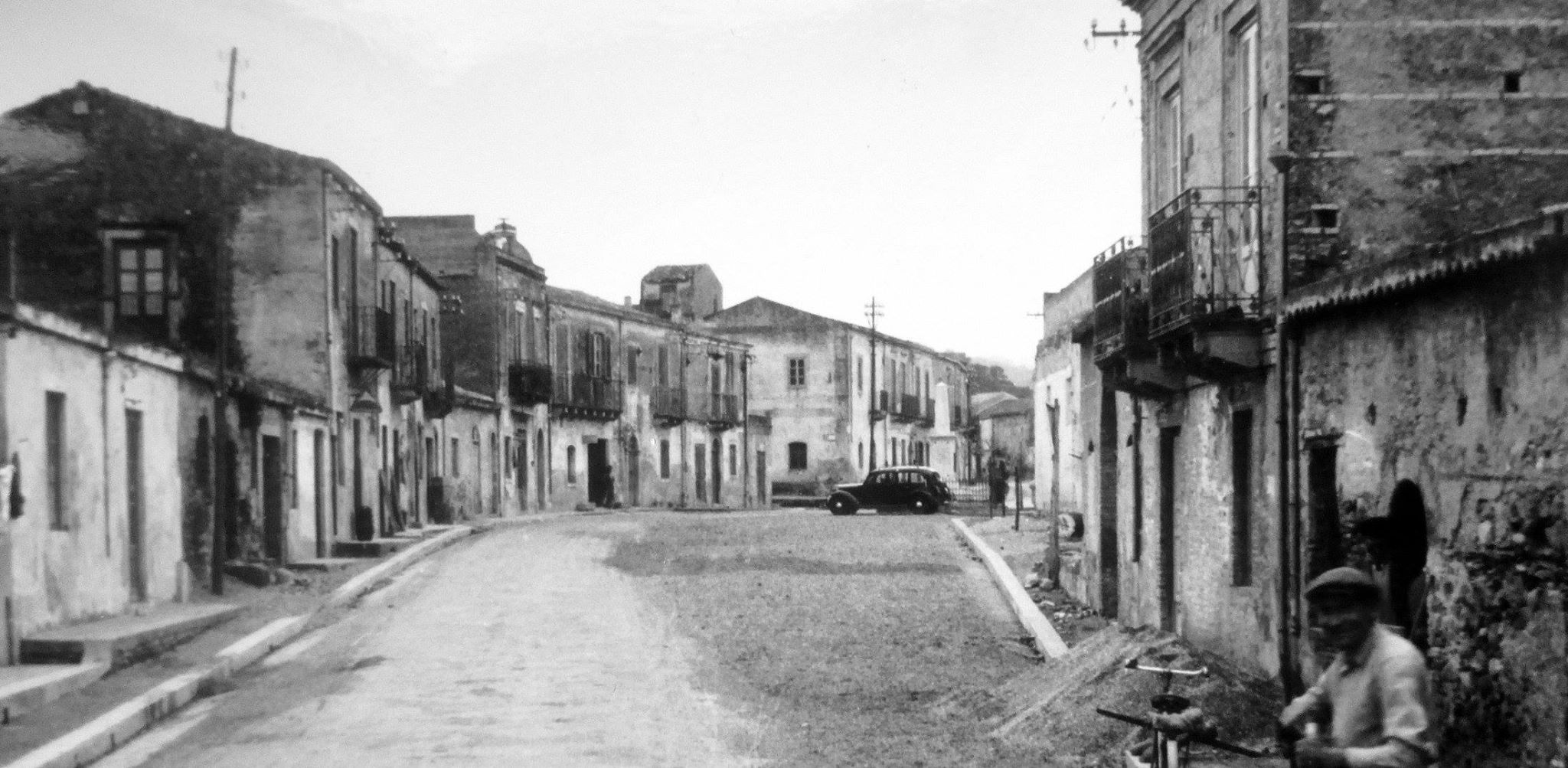
XXI October Street in 1955 during widening works

To implement the water system, a supra-municipal consortium was established between Torregrotta and five other municipalities in the district, which made it possible to build a new water pipeline and solve the problem of water shortage. In addition, street cleaning and garbage service with door-to-door system was established. Great emphasis was placed on the construction of houses for workers and the maintenance of roads, which were widened in some sections: this is the case of XXI October Street where in 1955 the Riposto della Torre, a historic building that had belonged to the fief of Santa Maria della Scala, was demolished.

The Torrese economy began a slow recovery that was characterized by the prominence of local handicrafts and small industrial activities related to clay extraction and processing of agricultural products; great prominence continued to be given to land-related activities. In the 1950s, the cultivation of potato was introduced, which quickly became the most important and most widespread Torrese crop, largely destined for foreign trade.

The emergence of new social categories produced a heated city debate marked by the unity of the city and discontinuity with the recent past dominated by the landed bourgeoisie and therefore considered "aristocratic." An expression of this change was Giovanni Tripoli, elected mayor in 1956, who led as an independent the progressive forces (PCI and PSDI) in the local elections held in May. Tripoli, interpreting national social and political dynamics, joined the Christian Democracy and led the coalition between DC and PSDI that defeated the PCI list in the November 1960 municipal elections.

In the meantime, the city began to grow with the creation of several new roads that required improvements to the public lighting system and the expansion of the water and sewage system. In addition, the municipal slaughterhouse was built and the process of building the church of Santa Maria della Scala began.

On October 11, 1964, a few weeks before the local elections, Mayor Giovanni Tripoli was seized by a sudden illness and died, generating a great commotion in the entire population of Torregrotta. The Christian Democracy, continuing their alliance with the PSDI, presented themselves to the voters with a list headed by Anna Scalia, Mayor Tripoli's widow and president of the Ente comunale di assistenza (ECA), winning the November 22 elections to the detriment of the opposition list. However, Mayor Anna Scalia's term ended early because, as had been pointed out during the election campaign, her top job role within the ECA placed her ineligible. The court in Messina declared her disqualification in March 1967, opening a period of ungovernability and administrative deadlock caused by a heated conflict within the DC. Between April and December 1967, Domenico Magliarditi and Andrea Nastasi took turns at the helm of the municipality without succeeding in resolving the political crisis that led to the dissolution of the City Council and the commissioning of the municipality.

=== The 1970s and 1980s ===
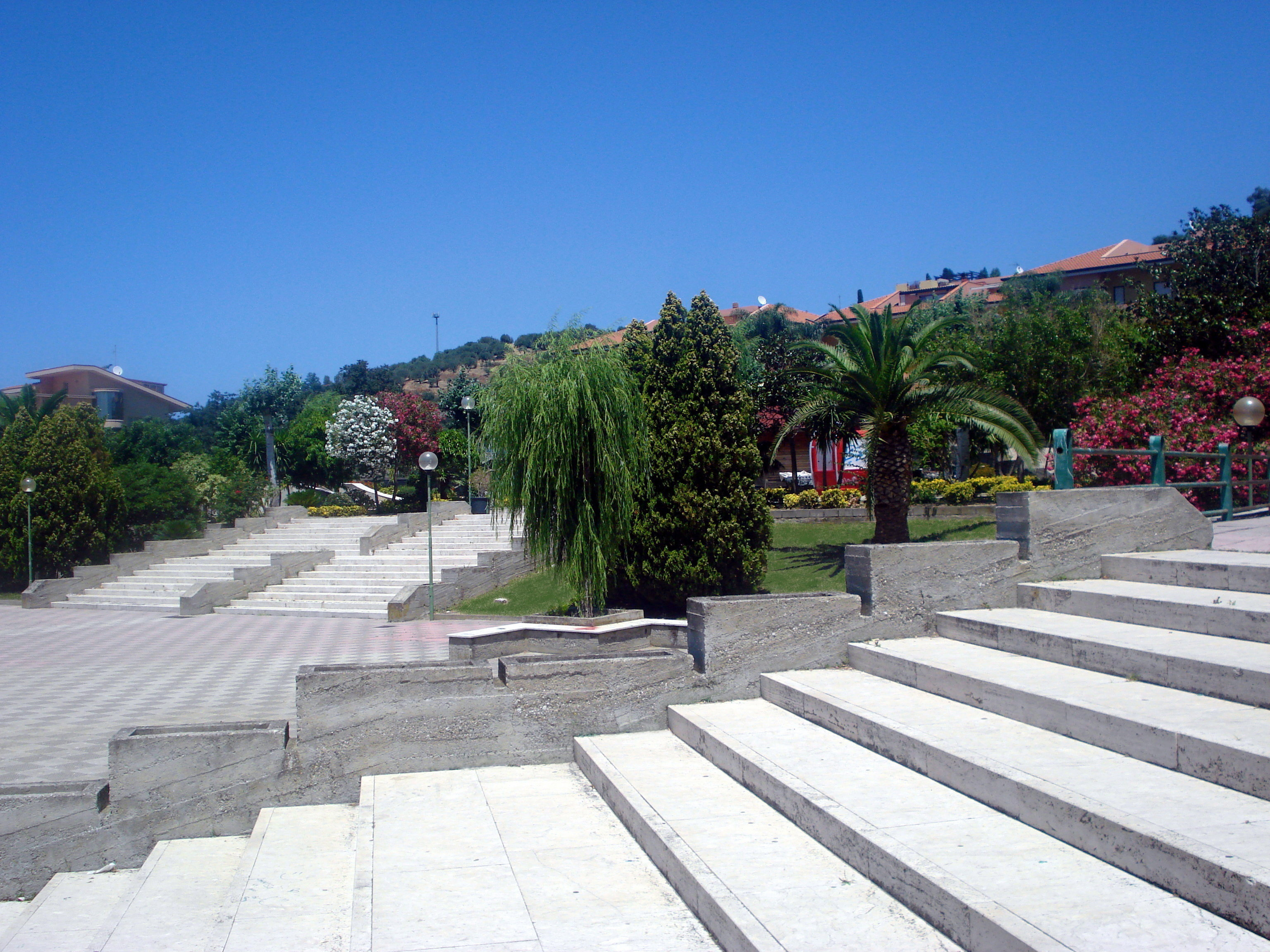
Glimpse of Piazza Unità d'Italia

In the November 1968 municipal elections, the center-left alliance between the Christian Democracy and the Unified Socialist Party prevailed, sealed by the so-called "pact of iron and honor" between Christian Democrat Domenico Magliarditi and Socialist Pietro Gangemi. It was a political but mostly personal agreement that dominated and influenced the political-administrative life of the city for about sixteen years. Magliarditi was elected mayor with Gangemi deputy mayor and senior alderman, the minority was won by a civic list of citizens while the Italian Communist Party list for the first time failed to elect representatives to the city council. In 1973 the Italian Republican Party joined the DC - PSI alliance, winning the November elections to the detriment of the united list between the PCI and PSDI, which fell to the minority. Magliarditi and Gangemi were reappointed in their respective roles, yet in 1974 an attempt to replace the mayor and junta failed: on March 3 they were first challenged by the City Council and then re-elected at the April 8 session because in the meantime the PCI representatives had come to an agreement with the two breaking the motion of no-confidence that had been signed and voted. The DC - PSI alliance with the Magliarditi - Gangemi duo persisted in the Torregrotta administration winning both the June 1979 and June 1984 elections. In both rounds the PSDI list won the minority while the PCI came third.

The expansion of the city, which had already begun in the 1960s, continued according to the urban planning forecasts contained in the fabrication program whose process had been started in 1969 and concluded with final approval in 1974. Several infrastructures were planned and built: new roads and squares including Viale Europa, Via R. Livatino and Piazza Unità d'Italia, a soccer field and several schools. Furthermore, the construction of the church of Santa Maria della Scala was finished and it was inaugurated on April 10, 1976. Between the 1970s and 1980s Torregrotta experienced the period of greatest economic and social development in its history. Torregrotta agriculture played a leading role with sbergia peaches and above all with potato, which was consolidated in the German markets. In addition, the Torrese brick industry experienced its most prosperous period. The new economic development caused Torregrotta's population growth, which catalyzed citizens from the hilly villages of the Peloritani: the number of inhabitants doubled from 3127 in 1961 to 6051 in 1991.

The death of Pietro Gangemi, on November 2, 1984, rekindled the never dormant internal conflicts within the DC, but above all it determined the weakening of the historic DC - PSI alliance to the point of clash and political rupture. On July 23, 1987, the city council approved the motion of no confidence against Mayor Domenico Magliarditi and the junta. In vain were the attempts to strengthen the alliance with the PSI, thus the DC managed to concretize a programmatic agreement with the PSDI that was formalized on September 1, 1987 with the re-election of Domenico Magliarditi as mayor supported by a new junta. The latter, however, was short-lived, since in February 1988 all members resigned, paving the way for an exclusively Christian Democrat junta with Magliarditi as mayor. In 1989 the Torrese DC managed to reunite with the PSI winning the May elections at the expense of a multifaceted aggregation promoted by Enzo Coco and composed of PSDI, PCI and citizens from various political backgrounds.

== See also ==
- History of Sicily
- Torregrotta
- Timeline of Torregrotta

== Bibliography ==
- Coco, Angelo; Nino De Leo; Pietro Di Stefano; Pippo Pandolfo. Torregrotta, una storia ricostruita. Messina: ediz. EDAS.
- Coco, Vincenzo. Il Consiglio Comunale di Torregrotta. Dall'autonomia ai nostri giorni. Milazzo: Lombardo Edizioni.
- Pandolfo, Pippo. Torregrotta. Messina: Editoriale Centonove.[ISBN unspecified]
- Pandolfo, Pippo. Torregrotta, finestra sul mare di Ulisse. Palermo: Krea.[ISBN unspecified]
- P. Nino Basile. San Paolino di Nola, Patrono di Torregrotta. Torregrotta: Parrocchia San Paolino V.[ISBN unspecified]
- Saporetti, Claudio (2008) [2008]. Diana Facellina. Un mistero Siciliano. Marina di Patti: Editrice Pungitopo. ISBN 978-88-89244-22-7.
- Scoglio, Guglielmo (2013) [2013]. Enigmi Siciliani. Firenze: Phasar Edizioni. ISBN 978-88-6358-205-5.
- Micale, Antonino. San Pier Niceto, avvenimenti e personaggi. Media Editoriale. ISBN 978-88-905992-2-4.
- Gazzara, Piero (2006) [2006]. "La donazione di Re Guglielmo II". Archivio Storico Romettese. Vol. 1. Trento: Editrice UNI service. ISBN 978-88-88859-84-2.
- Scoglio, Guglielmo (1987) [2007]. Monforte S.G. e il suo territorio nel medioevo. Vol. parte seconda. Trento: Editrice UNI service. ISBN 978-88-6178-049-1.
- Di Vita, Giuseppe (1906) [1906]. Dizionario geografico dei comuni della Sicilia e delle frazioni comunali: con notizie storiche. Palermo: ediz. F. Pravatà.[ISBN unspecified]
- Mario Crisafulli. "Aspetti storici, etno-antropologici, e naturalistici presso le foci del Muto e del Niceto". Aspetti Storici, Etno-antropologici, e Naturalistici Presso le Foci del Muto e del Niceto. Legambiente Tirreno.
- Sidoti, Giuseppe. Storia, arte, cultura, economia e tradizioni del popolo siciliano. Messina: Ed. Archivio Storico-Siciliano.[ISBN unspecified]
