= San Francesco delle Favete, Apiro =

Catholic Church in central Italy

Coordinates: 43.39272°N 13.13066°E

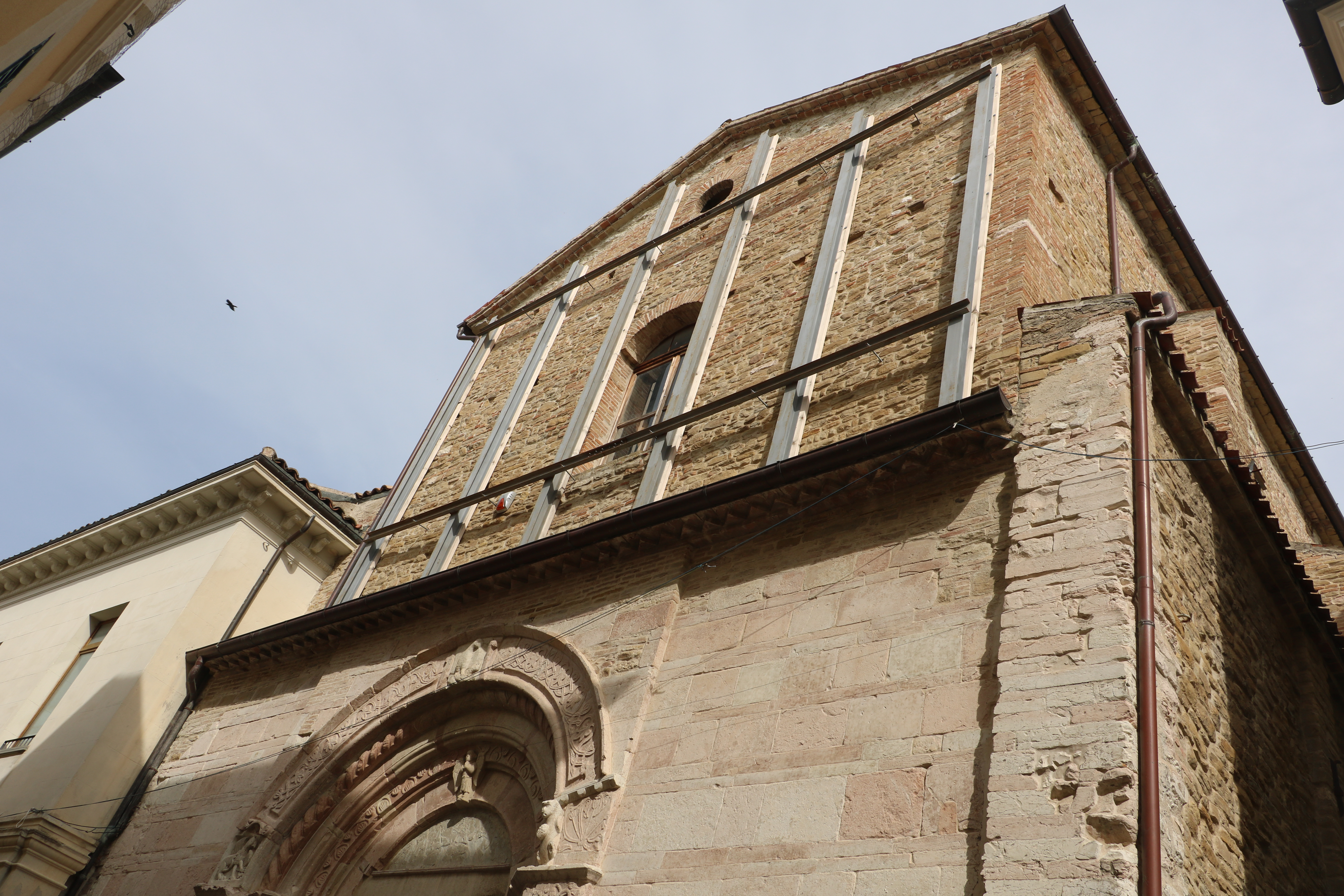
Partial view of the facade

San Francesco delle Favete is a Roman Catholic church located on Corso Vittorio Emanuelle #15 in the old town of Apiro, in the province of Macerata, region of Marche, Italy.

== History ==
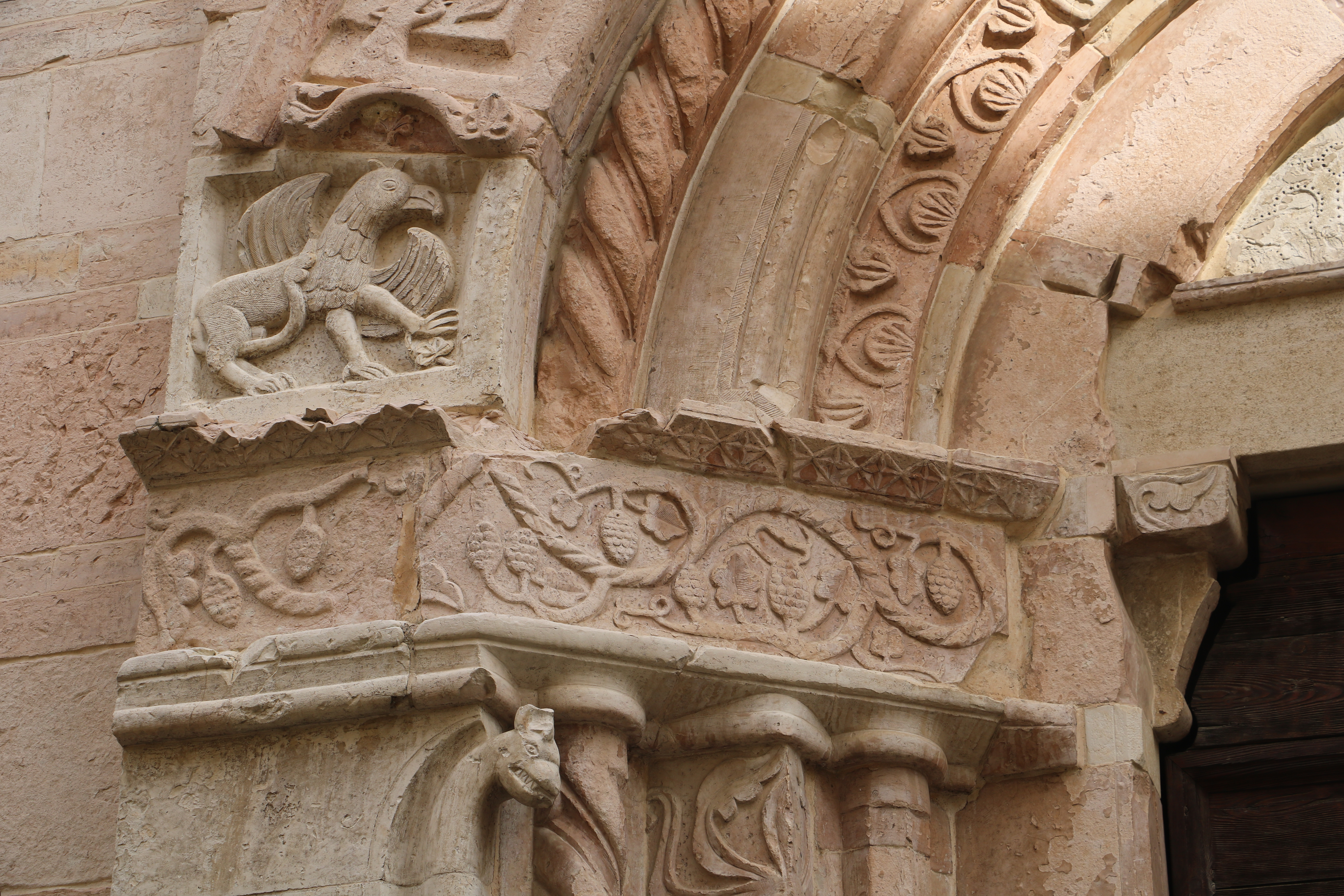
Detail of portal with griffon

Tradition holds that St Francis of Assisi himself performed miracles at this 14th-century church. He was visiting the Benedictine monastery of Sant'Urbano dell’Esinante. They prompted him to build a convent and a church at the site. The convent was ruined over the ages. The site had a grotto used by Francis for prayer. The Romanesque and Gothic style stone church retains traces of frescoes from the late 15th century in the apse. The superior portion of the façade and nave wall collapsed during the 2016 earthquake. The Romanesque main portal is decorated with sculptural depictions including grape clusters, intertwining vines, and a griffin.
