= Santa Maria Assunta, Poggio San Vicino =

Roman Catholic parish church

Coordinates: 43°22′35″N 13°04′42″E

Santa Maria Assunta is a Roman Catholic parish church located on Via Borgo Garibaldi #17 in the town of Poggio San Vicino, province of Macerata, region of Marche, Italy. It is located in the hilltop ridge of the north corner of town.

== History ==
The present simple brick façade with pilasters dates to the 18th century, but the base of the apse walls shows construction from an earlier Romanesque church.

The interior has richly decorated marble altars, and a pavement designed by the Pizzi family of San Severino Marche. Inside a niche has 16th-century wooden Crucifix by an unknown Florentine sculptor. One altarpiece depicts the Madonna of the Assumption with angels, and Saints Pacifico and Catherine of Siena. A fresco has an Enthroned Madonna.
