= Pieve Santa Maria Assunta, Pieve Torina =

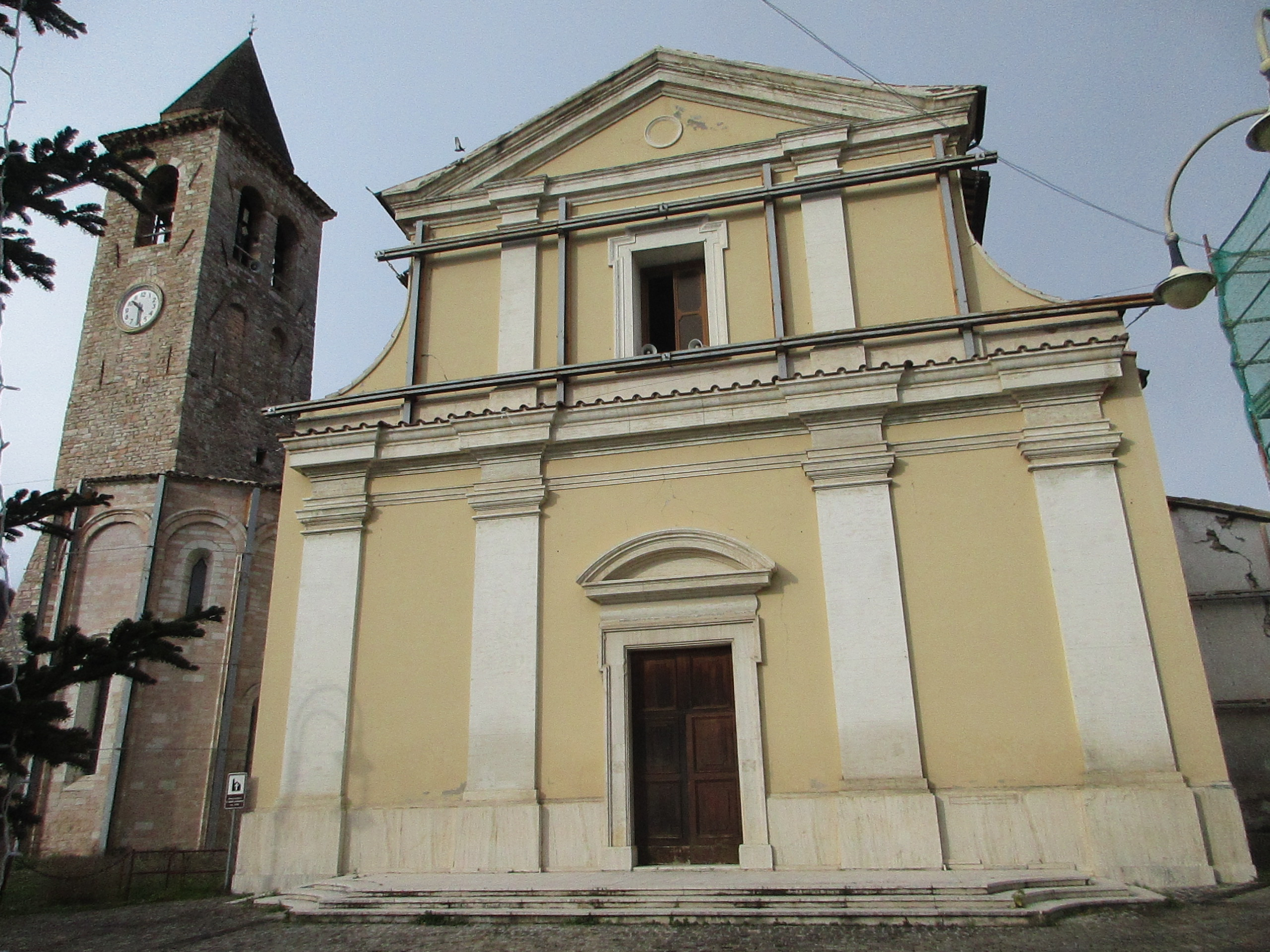
Chiesa di Santa Maria Assunta (Pieve Torina) - 2021.jpg

Pieve Santa Maria Assunta is a deconsecrated Roman Catholic church in the town of Pieve Torina, in the province of Macerata Marche, central Italy. The deconsecrated church is now used to display the painting collection of the town, including that from the former church of San Giovanni. but also from the churches of Pomarolo and San Teodora. It includes a Madonna and Child with Angels and Saints by Giovanni Andrea De Magistris and a fresco cycle from the 12th century originally in this church.
