= Carlo Ballesi =

Italian politician

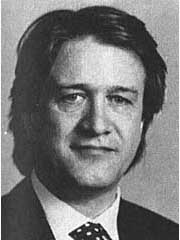
Carlo Ballesi

Carlo Ballesi (born 14 October 1949) is an Italian politician who served as a Senator (1992–1996) and Mayor of Macerata for two terms (1987–1990, 1990–1992).

He is the son of Elio Ballesi.
