= Poggio San Vicino =

San Giovanni
- Comune
- Comune di Fabriano
- Location within Italy Location within Marche
- Coordinates: 43°23′N 13°5′E
- Country: Italy
- Region: Marche
- Province: Province of Macerata (MC)

Area
  - Total: 12.9 km^{2} (5.0 sq mi)

Population (Dec. 2004)
  - Total: 299
  - Density: 23.2/km^{2} (60.0/sq mi)
- Time zone: UTC+1 (CET)
  - Summer (DST): UTC+2 (CEST)
- Postal code: 62020
- Dialing code: 0733

Poggio San Vicino is a comune (municipality) in the Province of Macerata in the Italian region Marche, located about 45 kilometres (28 mi) southwest of Ancona and about 30 kilometres (19 mi) northwest of Macerata. As of 31 December 2004, it had a population of 299 and an area of 12.9 square kilometres (5.0 mi^{2}).

Poggio San Vicino borders the following municipalities: Apiro, Cerreto d'Esi, Fabriano, Matelica, Serra San Quirico.

Among the churches is Santa Maria Assunta.

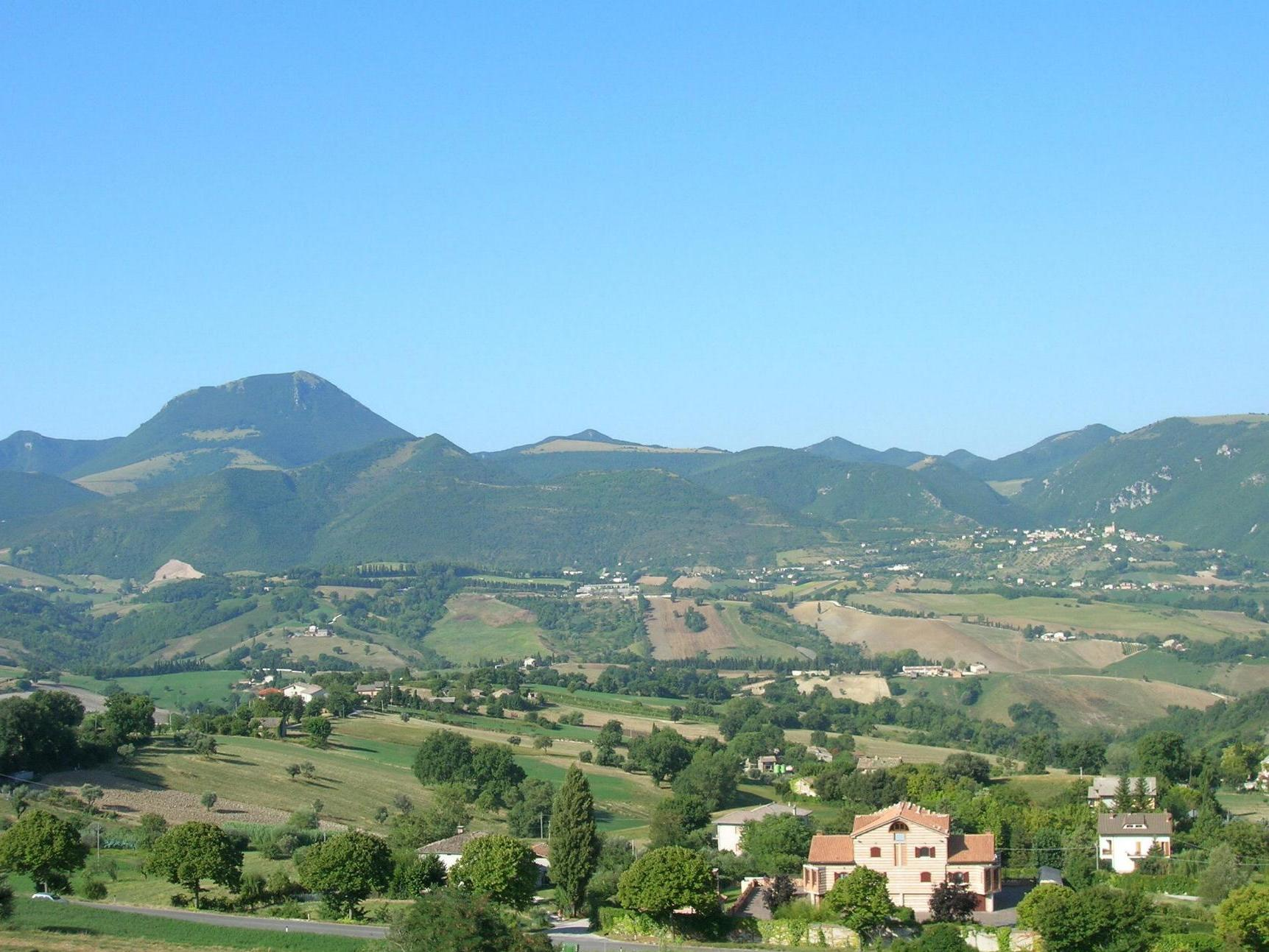
Poggio San Vicino

== Demographic evolution ==
Historical population

Year	Pop.	±%
1861	639	—
1871	714	+11.7%
1881	635	−11.1%
1901	690	+8.7%
1911	713	+3.3%

Year	Pop.	±%
1921	599	−16.0%
1931	1,036	+73.0%
1936	702	−32.2%
1951	679	−3.3%
1961	505	−25.6%

Year	Pop.	±%
1971	402	−20.4%
1981	342	−14.9%
1991	308	−9.9%
2001	303	−1.6%

Source: Data from ISTAT
