= Sandro Parcaroli =

Italian politician

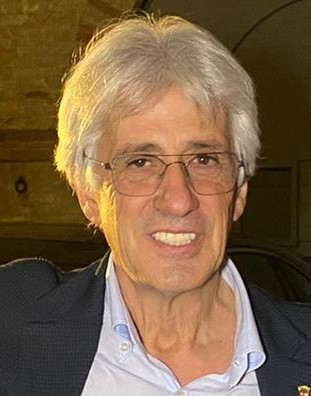

Mayor of Macerata
- Incumbent
- Assumed office 24 September 2020
- Preceded by: Romano Carancini

President of the Province of Macerata
- In office 19 December 2021 – 16 March 2026
- Preceded by: Antonio Pettinari
- Succeeded by: Alessandro Gentilucci

Personal details
- Born: 28 November 1956 (age 69) Camerino, Province of Macerata, Italy
- Party: Lega
- Profession: entrepreneur

Sandro Parcaroli (born 28 November 1956) is an Italian entrepreneur and politician who has served as mayor of Macerata since September 2020. He also served as president of the Province of Macerata from 2021 to 2026.

== Life and career ==
Born in Camerino, in the province of Macerata, he earned a diploma as a computer technician. After completing his military service at the S.S.A.M. in Macerata, he devoted himself to entrepreneurship and, in 1982, founded the company Med Computer in Macerata. Through this business, he became one of the first official resellers of Apple products in Italy.

Member of the right-wing party Lega, he ran for mayor of Macerata at the 2020 Italian local elections, supported by a centre-right coalition. He was elected at the first round with 52.78% and took office on 24 September 2020.

In December 2021, he was elected president of the Province of Macerata.

At the 2026 local elections, Parcaroli was re-confirmed as mayor of Macerata, winning the runoff with 54.3% of the vote, defeating his challenger Gianluca Tittarelli.

== Personal life ==
Parcaroli is married to Emanuela Bosco and has two children, Stefano and Lucia. Since 2004, he has resided in Crispiero, a hamlet of the municipality of Castelraimondo.

Political offices
Preceded by Romano Carancini	Mayor of Macerata since 2020	Succeeded by
