= Giuseppe Sposetti =

Italian politician

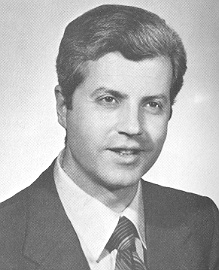
Giuseppe Sposetti

Giuseppe Sposetti (born 2 August 1933) is an Italian politician who served as a Deputy (1976–1983) and Mayor of Macerata for three terms (1967–1970, 1970–1975, 1980–1981).
