= Alessandro Gentilucci =

Italian politician

President of the Province of Macerata
- Incumbent
- Assumed office 16 March 2026
- Preceded by: Sandro Parcaroli

Mayor of Pieve Torina
- Incumbent
- Assumed office 26 May 2014
- Preceded by: Luigi Gentilucci

Personal details
- Born: 23 June 1977 (age 49) San Severino Marche, Italy
- Party: Brothers of Italy

Alessandro Gentilucci (born 23 June 1977) is an Italian politician serving as president of the Province of Macerata since March 2026.

== Life and career ==
Gentilucci was born in San Severino Marche in 1977 to Luigi Gentilucci, mayor of Pieve Torina. He began his political career in local administration in the Marche region, succeeding his late father as mayor of Pieve Torina in May 2014. He was involved in local reconstruction and coordination activities following the 2016 Central Italy earthquakes. He was subsequently re-elected mayor in 2019 with an overwhelming majority of over 90% of the vote, and again in 2024.

He also held roles in inter-municipal and regional bodies linked to local governance in the province of Macerata, including the March of Camerino Municipal Union.

He was elected president of the Province of Macerata on 16 March 2026, defeating Robertino Paoloni. Gentilucci obtained 48,371 weighted votes against 42,565 for his opponent.
