= List of mayors of Macerata =

Mayor of Macerata
- Sindaco di Macerata

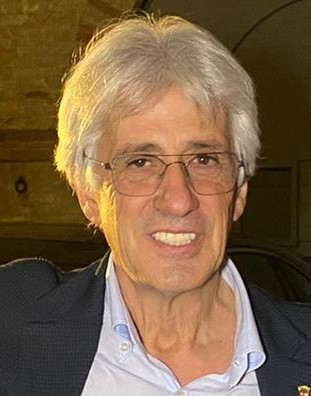
- Incumbent; Sandro Parcaroli since 24 September 2020
- Appointer: Popular election
- Term length: 5 years, renewable once
- Formation: 1860
- Website: Official website

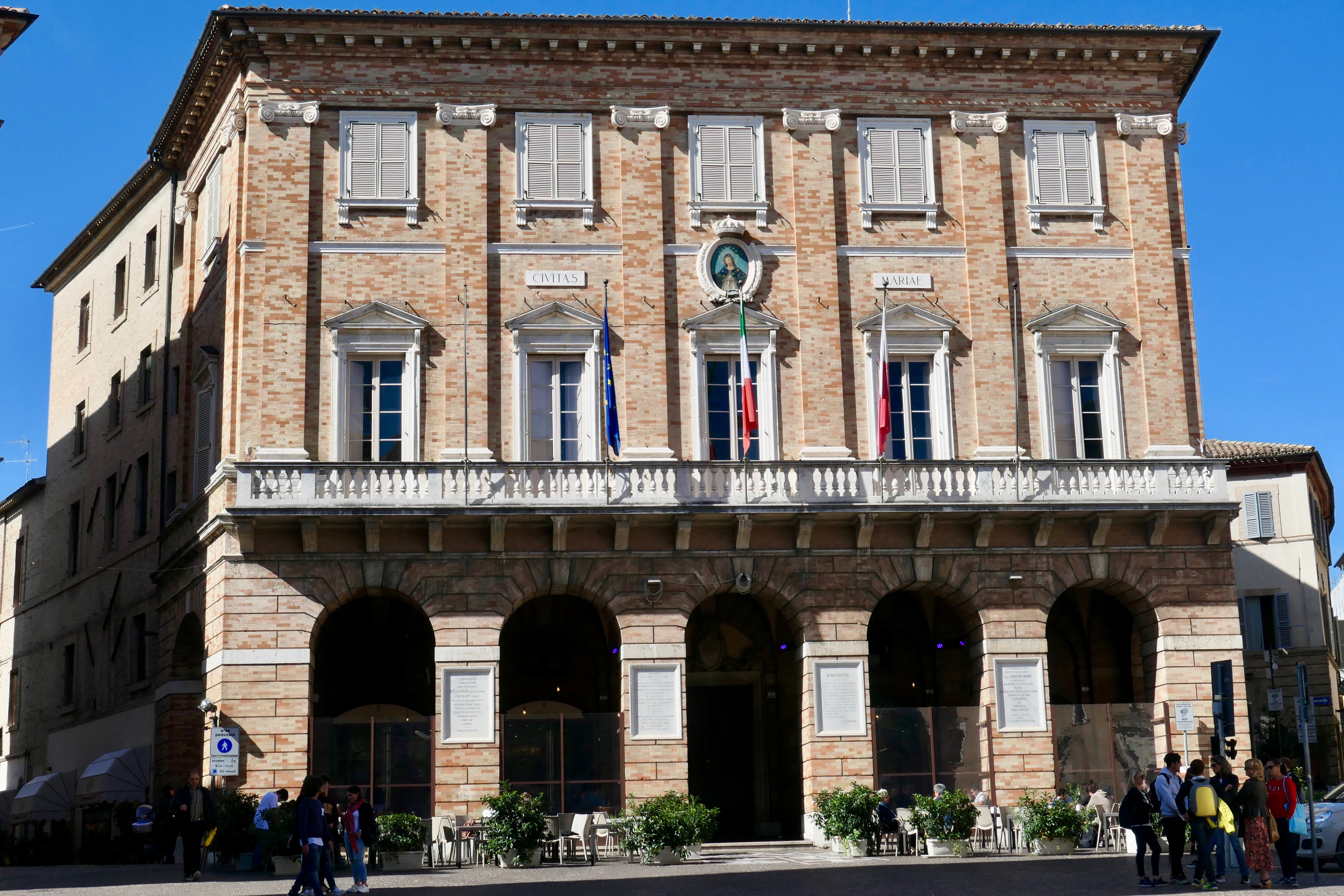
Macerata's Town Hall.

The mayor of Macerata is an elected politician who, along with the Macerata City Council, is accountable for the strategic government of Macerata in Marche, Italy.

The current mayor is Sandro Parcaroli (Lega), who took office on 24 September 2020.

== Overview ==
According to the Italian Constitution, the mayor of Macerata is member of the City Council.

The mayor is elected by the population of Macerata, who also elects the members of the City Council, controlling the mayor's policy guidelines and is able to enforce his resignation by a motion of no confidence. The mayor is entitled to appoint and release the members of his government.

Since 1993 the mayor is elected directly by Macerata's electorate: in all mayoral elections in Italy in cities with a population higher than 15,000 the voters express a direct choice for the mayor or an indirect choice voting for the party of the candidate's coalition. If no candidate receives at least 50% of votes, the top two candidates go to a second round after two weeks. The election of the City Council is based on a direct choice for the candidate with a preference vote: the candidate with the majority of the preferences is elected. The number of the seats for each party is determined proportionally.

== Italian Republic (since 1946) ==
=== City Council election (1946-1993) ===
From 1946 to 1993, the mayor of Macerata was elected by the City Council.

	Mayor	Term start	Term end	Party
1	Otello Perugini	20 April 1946	9 July 1956	DC
2	Franco Micucci Cecchi	9 July 1956	30 July 1956	DC
3	Elio Ballesi	30 July 1956	29 December 1957	DC
4	Arnaldo Marconi	29 December 1957	12 January 1965	DC
(3)	Elio Ballesi	12 January 1965	26 July 1967	DC
5	Giuseppe Sposetti	26 July 1967	4 September 1975	DC
6	Ireneo Vinciguerra	4 September 1975	28 July 1980	Ind
(5)	Giuseppe Sposetti	28 July 1980	24 January 1981	DC
7	Carlo Cingolani	24 January 1981	16 March 1987	DC
8	Carlo Ballesi	16 March 1987	27 January 1992	DC
(7)	Carlo Cingolani	27 January 1992	3 July 1993	DC
Special Prefectural Commissioner's tenure (3 July 1993 – 6 December 1993)

=== Direct election (since 1993) ===
Since 1993, under provisions of new local administration law, the mayor of Macerata is chosen by direct election, originally every four, then every five years.

	Mayor	Term start	Term end	Party	Coalition	Election
9	Gian Mario Maulo	6 December 1993	17 November 1997	Ind	PDS • PRC • LR	1993
10	Anna Menghi	17 November 1997	13 July 1999 (Note: Resigned.)	AN	FI • AN • CCD • CDU	1997
Special Prefectural Commissioner's tenure (13 July 1999 – 4 May 2000)
11	Giorgio Meschini	4 May 2000	5 April 2005	DS; PD	DS • PPI • PRC • PdCI	2000
11	Giorgio Meschini	5 April 2005	13 April 2010	DS; PD	DS • DL • PRC • PdCI	2005
12	Romano Carancini	13 April 2010	15 June 2015	PD	PD • FdS • IdV • SEL • FdV	2010
12	Romano Carancini	15 June 2015	24 September 2020	PD	PD • PRC • SEL • FdV	2015
13	Sandro Parcaroli	24 September 2020 (Note: Election originally scheduled for June 2020 then postponed due to the COVID-19 pandemic.)	12 June 2026	Lega	Lega • FdI • FI • UDC	2020
13	Sandro Parcaroli	12 June 2026 (Note: Election originally scheduled for September 2025 then postponed to May 2026. According to the Italian law, since 2011 local elections can take place each year only between 15 April and 15 June.)	Incumbent	Lega	Lega • FdI • FI • UDC • NM	2026
