= Pieve Torina =

- Comune
- Comune di Pieve Torina
- Location within Italy Location within Marche
- Coordinates: 43°3′N 13°3′E
- Country: Italy
- Region: Marche
- Province: Macerata (MC)
- Frazioni: Antico, Appennino, Capecchiara, Capodacqua, Capriglia, Casavecchia Alta, Fiume, Giulo, Le Rote, Lucciano, Pie' Casavecchia, Piecollina, Seggiole, Tazza, Torricchio, Vari

Government
  - Mayor: Alessandro Gentilucci

Area
  - Total: 74.8 km^{2} (28.9 sq mi)
- Elevation: 470 m (1,540 ft)

Population (31 December 2010)
  - Total: 1,501
  - Density: 20.1/km^{2} (52.0/sq mi)
- Time zone: UTC+1 (CET)
  - Summer (DST): UTC+2 (CEST)
- Postal code: 62036
- Dialing code: 0737

Pieve Torina is a comune (municipality) in the Province of Macerata in the Italian region Marche, located about 70 kilometres (43 mi) southwest of Ancona and about 45 kilometres (28 mi) southwest of Macerata.

Among the churches in the area are:

- Chiesa della Madonna di Monte Aguzzo
- Santa Maria Assunta parish church
