= Romano Carancini =

Italian politician (born 1961)

Member of the Regional Council of Marche
- In office 19 October 2020 – 27 September 2025

Mayor of Macerata
- In office 13 April 2010 – 24 September 2020
- Preceded by: Giorgio Meschini
- Succeeded by: Sandro Parcaroli

Personal details
- Born: 5 January 1961 (age 65) Macerata, Italy
- Party: Democrats of the Left (1998-2007); Democratic Party (since 2007)
- Education: University of Macerata
- Profession: Lawyer

Romano Carancini (born 5 January 1961) is an Italian politician. A member of the Democratic Party, he was elected mayor of Macerata on 13 April 2010 and re-confirmed for a second term on 15 June 2015.

In 2020, Carancini was elected as a member of the Regional Council of Marche. He was not re-confirmed in the 2025 election.

== See also ==
- 2010 Italian local elections
- 2015 Italian local elections
- List of mayors of Macerata

Political offices
Preceded by Giorgio Meschini	Mayor of Macerata; 2010–2020	Succeeded by Sandro Parcaroli
