= Sant'Urbano, Apiro =

Benedictine abbey in Apiro, Italy

Coordinates: 43.41048°N 13.08138°E

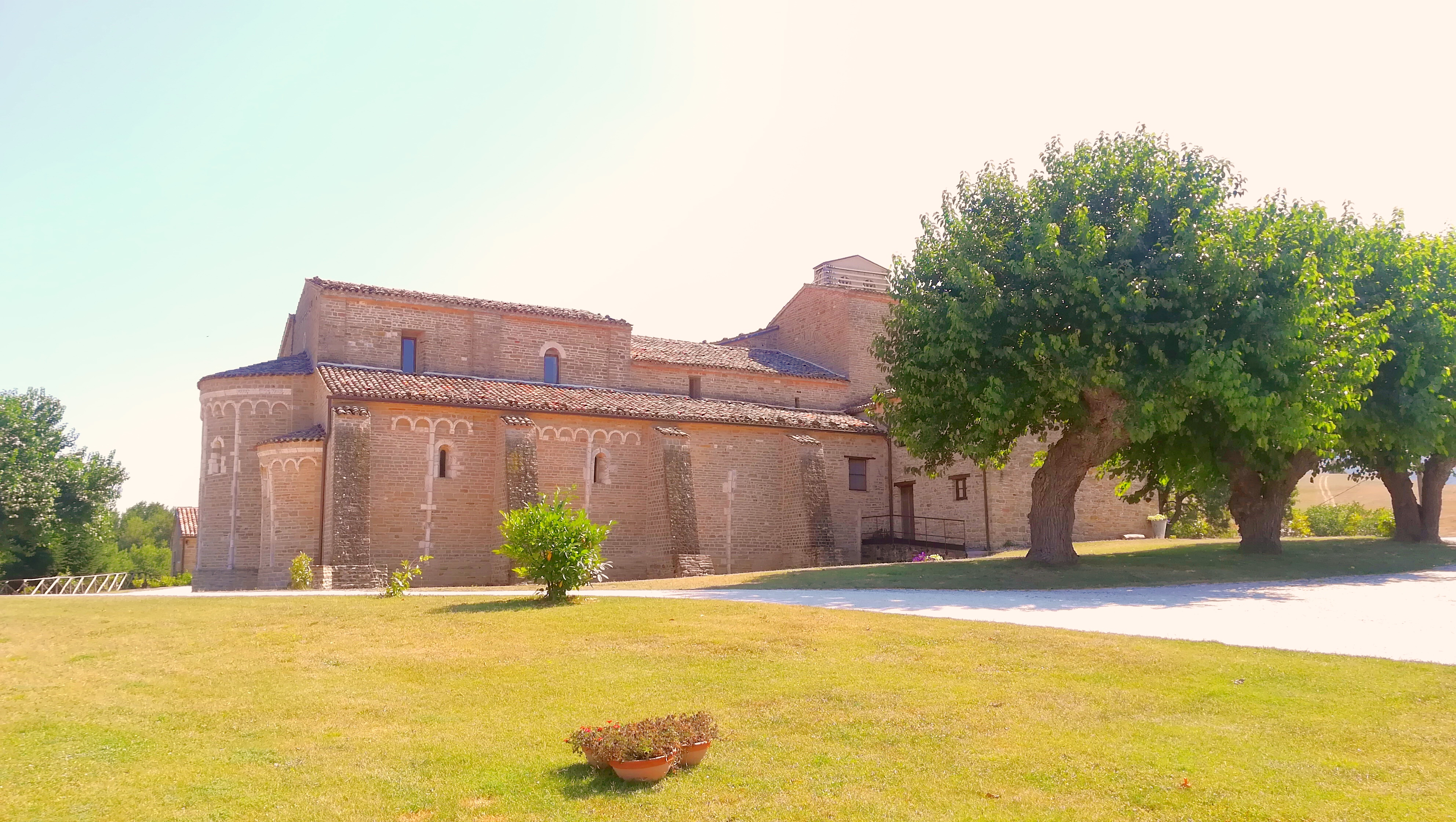
View of exterior of church

Sant'Urbano is a deconsecrated Roman Catholic church and Benedictine abbey in the town of Apiro, province of Macerata in the Marche, Italy. The deconsecrated church is now used to display the artifact and painting collection of the town.

== History ==
A large part of the collection consists of sacramental artifacts donated by Giovanni Giacomo Baldini (1581-1656), a doctor born in Apiro, who became the physician of Cardinal Scipione Borghese, Pope Urban VIII, and Pope Innocent X. Due to Baldini, the church of Sant'Urbano was made a collegiate church in 1632. In 1644, Baldini endowed the church with the artifacts, including reliquaries and silver goblets.

The displays are in the baroque sacristy of the church, which contains a Callido organ from 1771 and wooden decorations from Andrea Scoccianti, also called Raffaello delle Fogliarelle (1640-1700).

Also in the collection are parchments and paintings. Among the paintings are a St John the Baptist in the Desert by Valentin de Boulogne, a Pieta by Jusepe de Ribera, and paintings by Andrea Lilli.
