= Elio Ballesi =

Italian politician

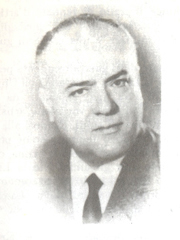
Elio Ballesi

Elio Ballesi (22 September 1920 – 20 October 1971) was an Italian politician who served as a Deputy (1954–1963), Senator (1968–1971) and Mayor of Macerata for two terms (1956–1957, 1965–1967).
