= Giulio Silenzi =

Italian politician (born 1951)

President of the Province of Macerata
- In office 27 June 2004 – 7 June 2009
- Preceded by: Sauro Pigliapoco
- Succeeded by: Franco Capponi

Regional assessor for Agriculture of Marche
- In office 2002 – April 2004

Regional assessor for Tourism, Industry and Commerce of Marche
- In office 20 June 1995 – 3 March 2000

Member of the Regional Council of Marche
- In office 10 July 1990 – 17 February 2005

Mayor of Monte San Giusto
- In office 1975 – 7 June 1990
- Succeeded by: Vittorio Petrini

Personal details
- Born: 4 October 1951 (age 74) Fermo, Province of Ascoli Piceno, Italy
- Party: Italian Communist Party; Democratic Party of the Left; Democrats of the Left; Democratic Party

Giulio Silenzi (born 4 October 1951) is an Italian politician of the Democratic Party.

He served as mayor of Monte San Giusto from 1975 to 1990, as a member of the Regional Council of Marche from 1990 to 2004, and as regional assessor in the government of Marche from 1995 to 2000, and from 2002 to 2004.

Silenzi was elected president of the Province of Macerata in 2004, defeating Franco Capponi in the runoff with the 53,12% of the vote. He was defeated by Capponi in the 2009 provincial election, receiving 47.59% of the vote to Capponi's 51.31%.
