= Apiro =

- Comune
- Comune di Apiro
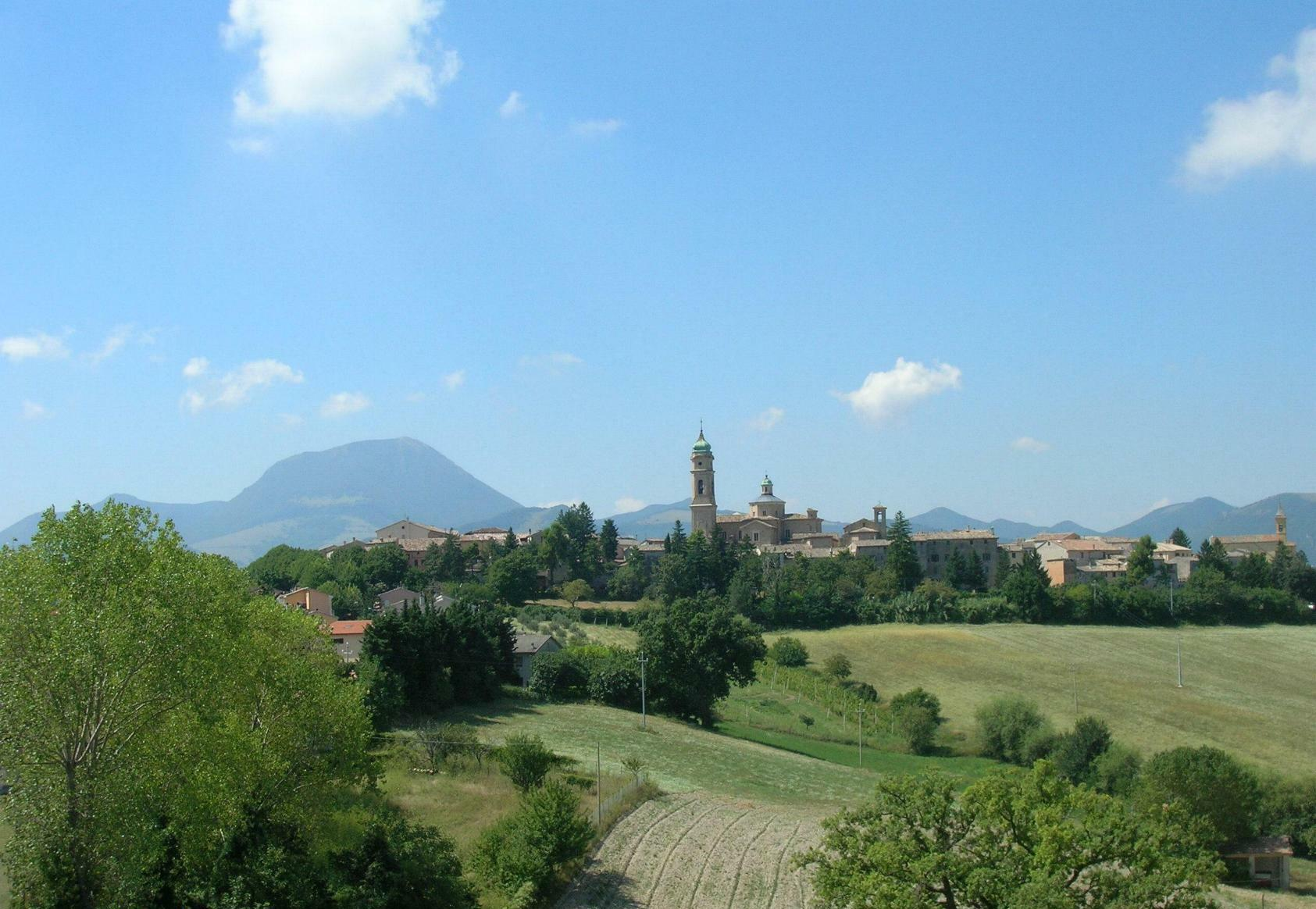
- Panorama with Monte San Vicino in the background.

- Coat of arms

- Location of Apiro in Italy Apiro (Marche)
- Coordinates: 43°23′N 13°8′E
- Country: Italy
- Region: Marche
- Province: Macerata (MC)
- Frazioni: Casalini, Favete, Frontale

Government
  - Mayor: Ubaldo Scuppa

Area
  - Total: 53.78 km^{2} (20.76 sq mi)
- Elevation: 516 m (1,693 ft)

Population (28 February 2017)
  - Total: 2,254
  - Density: 41.91/km^{2} (108.6/sq mi)
- Demonym: Apirani
- Time zone: UTC+1 (CET)
  - Summer (DST): UTC+2 (CEST)
- Postal code: 62021
- Dialing code: 0733
- Website: Official website

Apiro is a comune (municipality) in the Province of Macerata in the Italian region Marche, located about 40 kilometres (25 mi) southwest of Ancona and about 25 kilometres (16 mi) northwest of Macerata.

== Churches ==
- The church of Sant'Urbano has been converted into a museum of religious artifacts and paintings.
- San Francesco delle Favete, a 14th-century church is located a few kilometers outside of the old town of Apiro.
