= Monforte San Giorgio =

Monforte San Giorgio Μονφόρτε Σαν Τζόρτζιο
- Comune
- Comune di Monforte San Giorgio
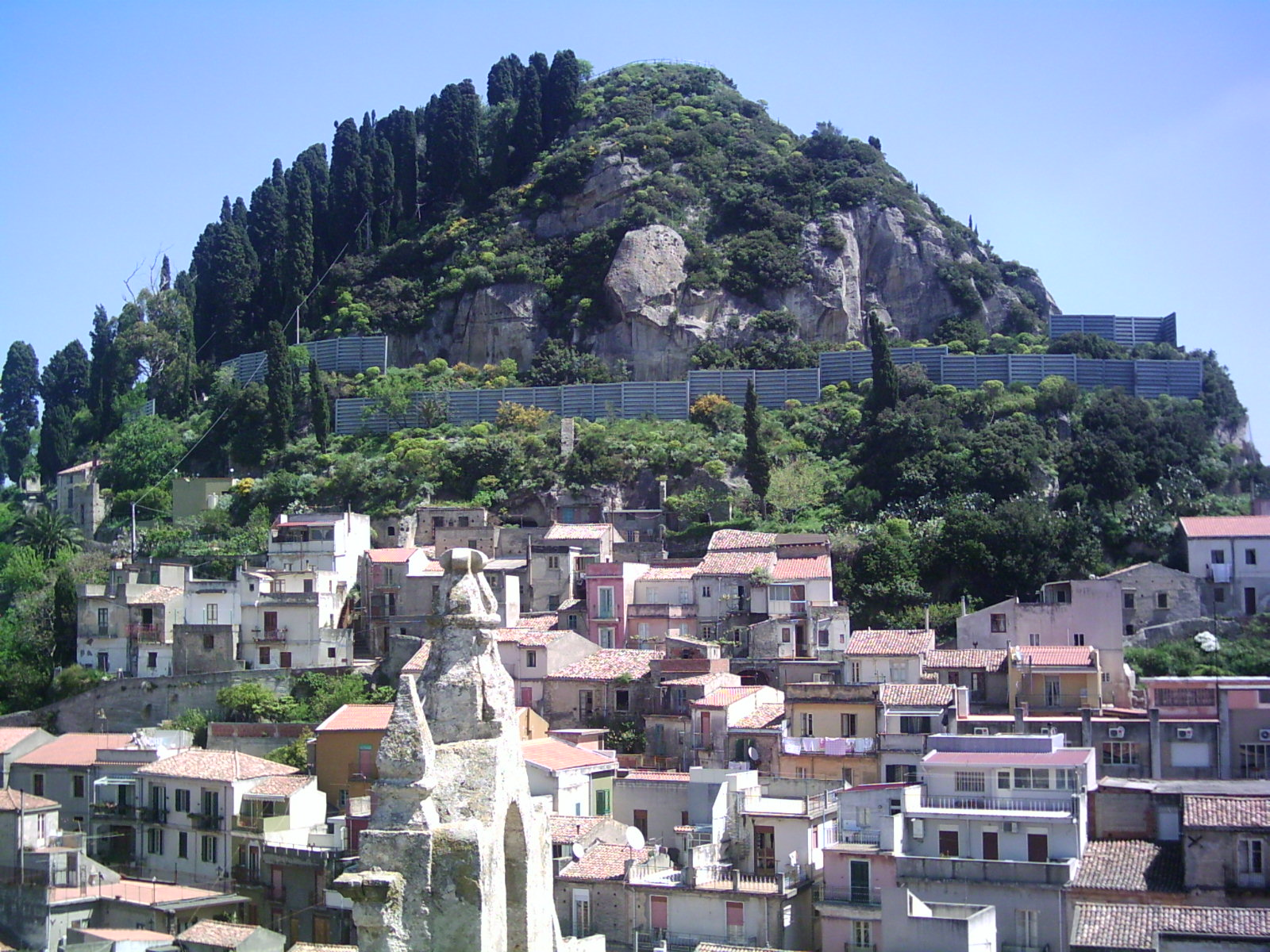

- Coat of arms

- Location within Italy Location within Sicily
- Coordinates: 38°10′N 15°22′E
- Country: Italy
- Region: Sicily
- Metropolitan city: Messina (ME)
- Frazioni: Monforte Marina, Monforte San Giorgio, Pellegrino

Government
  - Mayor: Giuseppe Cannistrà

Area
  - Total: 32.3 km^{2} (12.5 sq mi)
- Elevation: 287 m (942 ft)

Population (31 March 2012)
  - Total: 2,867
  - Density: 88.8/km^{2} (230/sq mi)
- Demonym: Monfortesi
- Time zone: UTC+1 (CET)
  - Summer (DST): UTC+2 (CEST)
- Postal code: 98041
- Dialing code: 090
- Patron saint: St. George
- Saint day: April 23
- Website: Official website

Monforte San Giorgio (Sicilian: Munforti) is a comune (municipality) in the Metropolitan City of Messina in the Italian region Sicily, located about 180 kilometres (110 mi) east of Palermo and about 15 kilometres (9 mi) west of Messina.

It is home to the remains of a castle built by the local Orthodox monks to resist the Arab attacks. Later it was used by the Normans and the royal houses of Hohenstaufen and Anjou.
