= 1985 Italian local elections =

The 1985 Italian local elections were held on 12 and 13 May. The elections were held in 6,562 municipalities and 86 provinces.

The elections were won by the Christian Democracy, led by Ciriaco De Mita. The election was also characterized by a strong result of the Italian Social Movement, which became the most voted party in the city of Bolzano in South Tyrol.

== Municipal elections in the main cities ==
Party	votes	votes (%)	seats
Christian Democracy (DC)	7,254,903	33.8	16,283
Italian Communist Party (PCI)	6,144,484	28.7	11,842
Italian Socialist Party (PSI)	3,299,998	15.4	6,232
Italian Republican Party (PRI)	1,027,410	4.8	1,158
Italian Social Movement (MSI)	1,027,332	4.8	1,098
Italian Democratic Socialist Party (PSDI)	932,785	4.3	1,356
Italian Liberal Party (PLI)	509,178	2.4	414
Proletarian Democracy (DP)	246,632	1.2	122
Federation of Green Lists (FLV)	184,729	0.9	79
South Tyrolean People's Party (SVP)	162,312	0.8	1575
Pentapartito	81,619	0.4	328
Sardinian Action Party (PSd'Az)	64,473	0.3	112
Venetian League (ŁV)	45,492	0.2	37
Others	464,928	2.5	1,213
Total	21,446,275	100	41,925

== Provincial elections ==
Party	votes	votes (%)	seats
Christian Democracy (DC)	11,814,220	33.5	951
Italian Communist Party (PCI)	10,519,672	29.9	824
Italian Socialist Party (PSI)	4,820,847	13.7	374
Italian Social Movement (MSI)	2,572,109	7.3	179
Italian Republican Party (PRI)	1,539,477	4.4	98
Italian Democratic Socialist Party (PSDI)	1,449,090	4.1	103
Italian Liberal Party (PLI)	906,836	2.6	49
Proletarian Democracy (DP)	554,210	1.6	14
Federation of Green Lists (FLV)	484,867	1.3	17
Venetian League (ŁV)	176,906	0.5	9
Sardinian Action Party (PSd'Az)	135,811	0.4	14
Others	257,600	0.7	5
Total		100	
