= 1951 Italian local elections =

The 1951 Italian local elections were the first after the majoritarian regulatory reforms wanted by the government of Alcide De Gasperi. In 1951 there was also the democratic re-establishment of the provincial councils, after the provinces had been administered for six years by temporary deputies appointed by the prefects. However, different from the municipal legislation that had general validity, the new provincial legislation applied only in 79 provinces.

The first turn of elections was held on 27–28 May for 3,071 municipalities and 27 provinces, while the second turn was held on 10–11 June for 2,165 municipalities and 30 provinces.

== Municipal elections ==
Municipalities won in the elections of 27–28 May.

Party	municipalities
Christian Democracy and allies	1,518
Socialists and Communists	393
Others	822
Total	2,733

== Provincial elections ==
Overall results in 27 provinces in the elections of 27 and 28 May.

Party	votes	%	seats
Christian Democracy (DC)	3,478,360	41.1	388
Italian Communist Party (PCI)	1,855,323	21.9	290
Italian Socialist Party (PSI)	1,131,871	13.4	290
Unitary Socialist Party of Italian Workers (PSULI)	654,379	7.7	66
Socialist Party of Italian Workers (PSLI)	184,942	2.2	66
Unitary Socialist Party (PSU)	48,041	0.6	66
Italian Social Movement (MSI)	337,606	4.0	17
Italian Republican Party (PRI)	276,809	3.3	24
Italian Liberal Party (PLI)	267,826	3.2	26
Independents of the left	84,756	1.0	8
Independents of the centre	45,540	0.5	-
Independents	37,779	0.4	8
Monarchist National Party (PNM)	33,019	0.4	4
Independents of the right	32,576	0.3	-
Contributors	550	0.0	-
Total		100	831

Overall results in 30 provinces in the elections of 10 and 11 June.

Party	votes	%	seats
Christian Democracy (DC)	2,351,018	35.9	339
Italian Communist Party (PCI)	1,529,423	23.3	207
Italian Socialist Party (PSI)	849,699	12.9	113
Unitary Socialist Party of Italian Workers (PSULI)	346,607	5.3	36
Italian Social Movement (MSI)	280,731	4.3	23
Italian Liberal Party (PLI)	256,165	3.9	20
Independents of the left	151,031	2.3	25
Italian Republican Party (PRI)	150,620	2.3	16
Socialist Party of Italian Workers (PSLI)	124,325	1.9	5
Independents of the right	108,034	1.6	18
Monarchist National Party (PNM)	105,083	1.6	10
Independents of the centre	85,604	1.3	19
Unitary Socialist Party (PSU)	66,483	1.0	3
Others	158,158	2.4	15
Total	6,562,981	100	849
