= 1975 Italian local elections =

The 1975 Italian local elections were held on 15 and 16 June. The elections were held in 6,345 municipalities and 86 provinces.

== Municipal elections ==
Party	votes	votes (%)	seats
Christian Democracy (DC)	7,133,336	34.7	15,462
Italian Communist Party (PCI)	6,622,388	32.2	12,368
Italian Socialist Party (PSI)	2,737,307	13.3	5,270
Italian Democratic Socialist Party (PSDI)	1,199,035	5.8	1,774
Italian Social Movement (MSI)	1,123,036	5.5	1,084
Italian Republican Party (PRI)	736,664	3.6	739
Italian Liberal Party (PLI)	476,293	2.3	347
Proletarian Unity Party (PDUP)	150,339	0.7	74
Others	376,570	1.9	1,046
Total	20,554,968	100	38,164

== Provincial elections ==
Party	votes	votes (%)	seats
Christian Democracy (DC)	10,732,902	34.8	946
Italian Communist Party (PCI)	10,101,761	32.7	860
Italian Socialist Party (PSI)	3,933,700	12.7	330
Italian Social Movement (MSI)	2,093,237	6.8	161
Italian Democratic Socialist Party (PSDI)	1,800,127	5.8	142
Italian Republican Party (PRI)	1,048,868	3.4	73
Italian Liberal Party (PLI)	846,851	2.7	43
Proletarian Democracy (DP)	78,688	0.3	1
Proletarian Unity Party (PDUP)	57,337	0.2	3
Sardinian Action Party (PSd'Az)	21,960	0.1	2
Others	155,256	0.5	4
Total	30,870,687	100	2,565
