= 1980 Italian local elections =

The 1980 Italian local elections were held on 8 and 9 June. The elections were held in 6,575 municipalities and 86 provinces.

== Municipal elections ==
Summary of the results of all the provincial capital municipalities except Novara, Genoa, Pavia, Belluno, Trieste, Pordenone, Ravenna, Siena, Ancona, Ascoli Piceno, Rome, Bari and Foggia.

Party	votes	votes (%)	seats
Christian Democracy (DC)	2,884,155	33.1	1,509
Italian Communist Party (PCI)	2,516,862	29.0	1,038
Italian Socialist Party (PSI)	1,182,834	13.6	527
Italian Social Movement (MSI)	629,114	7.2	213
Italian Democratic Socialist Party (PSDI)	479,612	5.6	207
Italian Republican Party (PRI)	383,476	4.4	157
Italian Liberal Party (PLI)	335,252	3.9	98
Proletarian Democracy (DP)	90,310	1.0	9
Proletarian Unity Party (PDUP)	60,683	0.7	6
Others	138,712	1.3	66
Total	8,705,802	100	3,830

== Provincial elections ==
Summary of the results of all the provinces except Aosta, Pavia, Trento, Bolzano, Gorizia, Ravenna, Rome, Viterbo and Foggia.

Party	votes	votes (%)	seats
Christian Democracy (DC)	11,116,374	36.0	981
Italian Communist Party (PCI)	9,603,214	31.1	816
Italian Socialist Party (PSI)	4,119,965	13.3	343
Italian Social Movement (MSI)	1,923,005	6.2	144
Italian Democratic Socialist Party (PSDI)	1,673,324	5.4	129
Italian Republican Party (PRI)	1,062,261	3.4	78
Italian Liberal Party (PLI)	911,486	3.0	52
Proletarian Democracy (DP)	160,028	0.5	2
Proletarian Unity Party (PDUP)	94,615	0.3	3
List for Trieste (LpT)	86,409	0.3	11
Sardinian Action Party (PSd'Az)	44,795	0.2	5
Others	119,437	0.3	7
Total		100	
