= 1960 Italian local elections =

The 1960 Italian local elections were held on 6 and 7 November. The elections were held in 6,900 municipalities and 78 provinces.

== Municipal elections ==
Results summary of the 82 provincial capital municipalities.

Party	votes	votes (%)	seats
Christian Democracy (DC)	3,002,897	34.9	1,519
Italian Communist Party (PCI)	2,041,995	23.7	831
Italian Socialist Party (PSI)	1,245,198	14.5	545
Italian Social Movement (MSI)	625,861	7.3	240
Italian Democratic Socialist Party (PSDI)	543,022	6.3	197
Italian Democratic Party (PDI)	410,666	4.8	97
Italian Liberal Party (PLI)	405,491	4.7	135
Italian Republican Party (PRI)	133,703	1.6	56
Italian Monarchist Party (PMI)	17,133	0.2	1
PSDI – PRI	17,087	0.2	8
Centre-right	15,971	0.2	16
PDI – MSI	3,872	0.0	6
Others	141,527	1.6	69
Total	8,604,423	100	3,720

== Provincial elections ==
Results summary of 77 provinces. The elections were not held in the provinces of Gorizia, Vercelli and due to force majeure in the province of Rovigo.

Party	votes	votes (%)	seats
Christian Democracy (DC)	10,021,718	40.3	982
Italian Communist Party (PCI)	6,085,848	24.5	576
Italian Socialist Party (PSI)	3,580,338	14.4	335
Italian Social Movement (MSI)	1,473,835	5.9	125
Italian Democratic Socialist Party (PSDI)	1,426,363	5.7	118
Italian Liberal Party (PLI)	998,504	4.0	78
Italian Democratic Party (PDI)	715,499	2.9	41
Italian Republican Party (PRI)	319,978	1.3	27
Mixed lists	105,162	0.5	9
Others	135,369	0.5	7
Total	24,862,614	100	2,298
