= 1970 Italian local elections =

The 1970 Italian local elections were held on 7 and 8 June. The elections were held in 6,632 municipalities and 88 provinces.

== Municipal elections ==
Results summary of municipalities with more than 5,000 inhabitants.

Party	votes	votes (%)	seats
Christian Democracy (DC)	7,058,239	37.3	17,522
Italian Communist Party (PCI)	4,768,511	25.2	9,110
Italian Socialist Party (PSI)	2,169,727	11.5	4,656
Unitary Socialist Party (PSU)	1,322,671	7.0	1,946
Italian Liberal Party (PLI)	821,985	4.3	692
Italian Social Movement (MSI)	806,200	4.3	888
Italian Republican Party (PRI)	564,185	3.0	622
Italian Socialist Party of Proletarian Unity (PSIUP)	547,296	2.9	649
PCI – PSIUP	237,113	1.3	1,089
Heterogeneous lists	193,773	1.0	927
Independents	122,874	0.6	329
Mixed left lists	120,290	0.6	463
Italian Democratic Party of Monarchist Unity (PDIUM)	87,382	0.5	19
Mixed centre-left lists	55,422	0.2	258
Mixed right lists	33,219	0.1	100
PSI – PSU	2,993	0.0	14
Others	37,032	0.2	48
Total		100	

== Provincial elections ==
Party	votes	votes (%)	seats
Christian Democracy (DC)	1,0342,691	37.3	1,004
Italian Communist Party (PCI)	7,397,981	26.7	697
Italian Socialist Party (PSI)	3,062,146	11.0	284
Unitary Socialist Party (PSU)	2,019,221	7.3	176
Italian Social Movement (MSI)	1,657,873	6.0	138
Italian Liberal Party (PLI)	1,353,262	4.9	101
Italian Socialist Party of Proletarian Unity (PSIUP)	958,226	3.4	72
Italian Republican Party (PRI)	848,370	3.1	60
Sardinian Action Party (PSd'Az)	29,458	0.1	3
Others	43,429	0.2	2
Total	27,712,657	100	2,537
