= 1956 Italian local elections =

The 1956 Italian local elections were held on 27 and 28 May. The elections were held in 7,141 municipalities and 78 provinces.

== Municipal elections ==
Results summary of the main municipalities.

Party	votes	votes (%)	seats
Christian Democracy (DC)	4,986,458	35.4	
Italian Communist Party (PCI)	3,348,774	23.8	
Italian Socialist Party (PSI)	2,133,404	15.2	
Monarchists	947,703	6.7	
Italian Social Movement (MSI)	877,066	6.2	
Italian Democratic Socialist Party (PSDI)	785,209	5.6	
Italian Liberal Party (PLI)	455,459	3.3	
Italian Republican Party (PRI)	257,508	1.8	
Others	283,979	2.2	
Total	14,075,560	100	

== Provincial elections ==
Results summary of 78 provinces.

Party	votes	votes (%)	seats
Christian Democracy (DC)	9,301,633	38.9	1.082
Italian Communist Party (PCI)	8,405,604	35.1	513
Italian Socialist Party (PSI)	8,405,604	35.1	339
Italian Democratic Socialist Party (PSDI)	1,783,481	7.5	109
Italian Liberal Party (PLI)	1,010,763	4.2	71
Monarchist National Party (PNM)	737,331	3.1	40
People's Monarchist Party (PMP)	737,331	3.1	27
Italian Social Movement (MSI)	396,349	1.6	82
Italian Republican Party (PRI)	275,155	1.1	28
Others	2,023,634	10.1	65
Total	23,933,950	100	2,358
