= 1964 Italian local elections =

The 1964 Italian local elections were held on 22 and 23 November. The elections were held in 6,767 municipalities and 74 provinces.

== Municipal elections ==
Results summary of the 78 provincial capital municipalities.

Party	votes	votes (%)	seats
Christian Democracy (DC)	2,593,369	33.17	1415
Italian Communist Party (PCI)	1,985,974	25.40	843
Italian Liberal Party (PLI)	907,652	11.61	318
Italian Socialist Party (PSI)	880,438	11.26	385
Italian Democratic Socialist Party (PSDI)	573,489	7.33	241
Italian Social Movement (MSI)	422,698	540	195
Italian Socialist Party of Proletarian Unity (PSIUP)	190,799	2.44	69
Italian Democratic Party of Monarchist Unity (PDIUM)	109,853	1.40	29
Italian Republican Party (PRI)	79,179	1.01	41
Others	73,852	0.94	44
Total	7,817,303	100	3,580

== Provincial elections ==
Party	votes	votes (%)	seats
Christian Democracy (DC)	9,476,812	37.36	891
Italian Communist Party (PCI)	6,600,887	26.02	602
Italian Socialist Party (PSI)	2,866,346	11.30	244
Italian Liberal Party (PLI)	2,018,780	7.95	145
Italian Democratic Socialist Party (PSDI)	1,674,871	6.60	143
Italian Social Movement (MSI)	1,265,919	4.99	100
Italian Socialist Party of Proletarian Unity (PSIUP)	737,079	2.90	59
Italian Republican Party (PRI)	297,800	1.17	22
Italian Democratic Party of Monarchist Unity (PDIUM)	236,952	0.93	13
Others	189,952	0.74	13
Total	25,365,398	100	2,232
