= Potenza (disambiguation) =

Potenza (Italian for "power") is a comune in Basilicata, an Italian region of Southern Italy. It may also refer to:

== Places ==
- Province of Potenza, a province of Basilicata
- Potenza Picena, a comune in the province of Macerata, Marche
- Porto Potenza Picena, a civil parish of Potenza Picena, Marche
- Vietri di Potenza, a town and comune in the province of Potenza, Basilicata
- Potentia (ancient city)

== Geographical features ==
- Potenza (river), a river in Marche, Italy

== People ==
- Alessandro Potenza (born 1984), an Italian football player
- Christian Potenza (born 1972), a Canadian actor
- Frank Potenza (1933–2011), an American police officer associated with Jimmy Kimmel Live!
- Frank Potenza (guitarist) (born 1950), an American jazz guitarist
- Gianmaria Potenza (born 1936), Italian artist
- Marc Potenza (born 1965), an American psychiatrist

== Automotive ==
- Potenza Sports Cars, owners of British car manufacturers Westfield Sportscars and GTM Cars
- Bridgestone Potenza, a line of performance tires manufactured by Bridgestone
