= Vittorazi Easy 100 Plus =

Italian aircraft engine

Easy 100 Plus
- Type: Aircraft engine
- National origin: Italy
- Manufacturer: Vittorazi Motors

The Vittorazi Easy 100 Plus is an Italian aircraft engine, designed and produced by Vittorazi Motors of Morrovalle for use in paramotors.

== Design and development ==
The Easy 100 Plus engine is a single-cylinder two-stroke, 98.2 cc (6.0 cu in) displacement, air-cooled, petrol engine design, with a poly V belt reduction drive with reduction ratios of 3.3:1 and 3.8:1. It employs capacitor discharge ignition and produces 18 hp (13 kW) at 9500 rpm, with a compression ratio of 10.0:1.

== Specifications (Easy 100 Plus) ==
Data from Tacke

=== General characteristics ===
- Type: Single cylinder, two stroke aircraft engine
- Bore: 50 mm (2.0 in)
- Stroke: 50 mm (2.0 in)
- Displacement: 98.2 cc (6.0 cu in)
- Length: 540 mm (21.3 in)
- Width: 500 mm (19.7 in)
- Height: 212 mm (8.3 in)
- Dry weight: 12 kg (26.5 lb)

=== Components ===
- Fuel type: petrol with 2.5% oil mixture for lubrication
- Cooling system: air
- Reduction gear: poly V belt, 3.3:1 or 3.8:1

=== Performance ===
- Power output: 18 hp (13 kW)
- Compression ratio: 10.0:1

== See also ==
Related lists

- List of aircraft engines
