= Macellari =

Macellari is an Italian surname. Notable people with the surname include:

- Fabio Macellari (born 1974), Italian footballer
- Giordano Macellari (born 1962), Italian artist
- Liana Burgess (born Macellari), Italian translator and literary agent
