= Hotel House =

Residential building in Porto Recanati, Italy

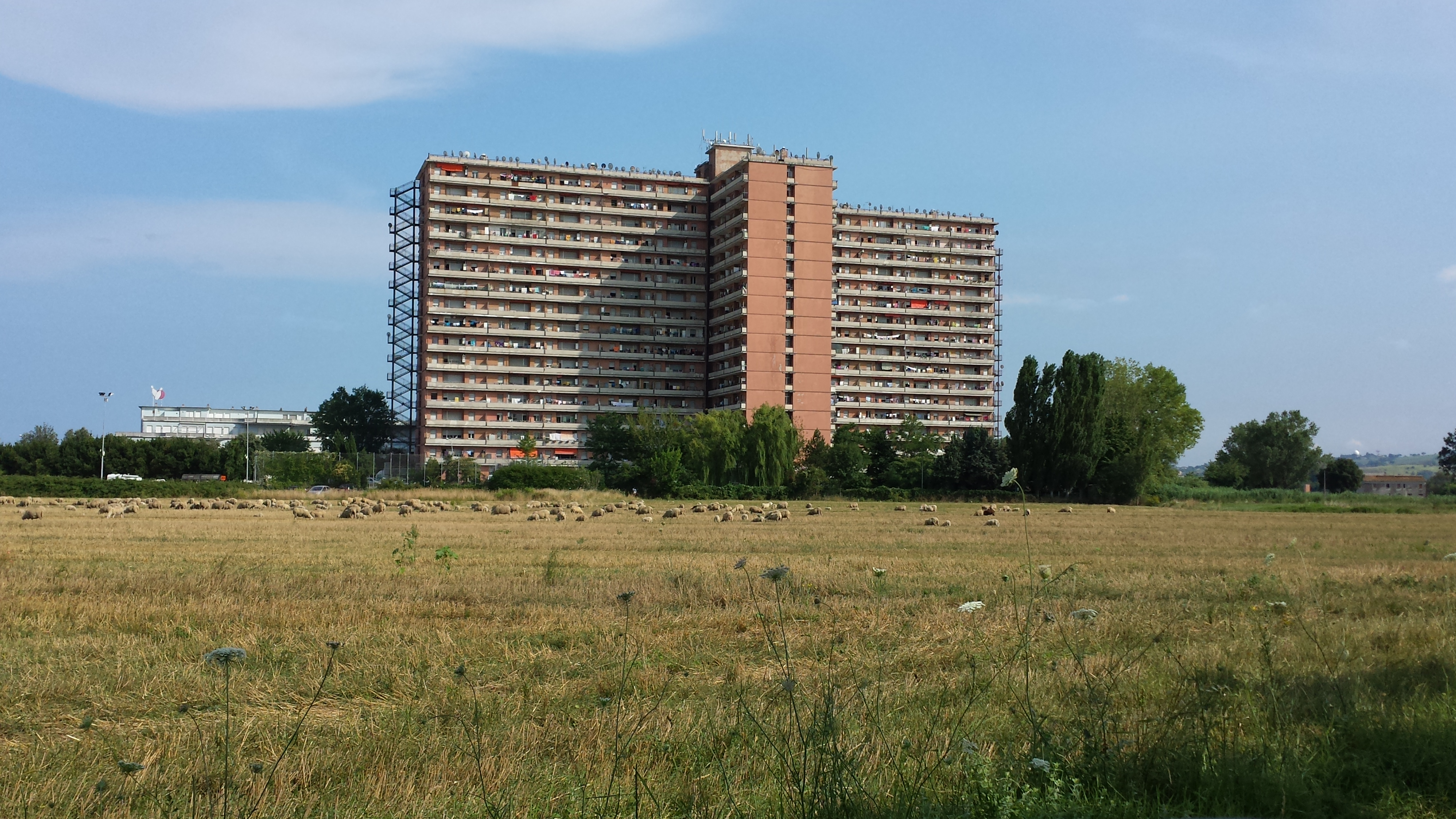
- Interactive map of the Hotel House area

General information
- Type: Apartment building
- Location: 43°25′00.09″N 13°39′54.3″E, Via Salvo D'Acquisto 8, Porto Recanati, Marche, Italy
- Coordinates: 43°25′0.09″N 13°39′54.3″E
- Completed: 1968

Technical details
- Floor count: 17
- Lifts/elevators: 8, plus 2 freight elevators (unused)

Hotel House is an apartment building in Porto Recanati, Italy, about 25 km from the regional capital Ancona. The building houses around 2,000 people (roughly 20% of the town's population) in 480 units.

The building is diverse and swells significantly in size during the summer months; 90% of inhabitants are foreign, representing 40 different nationalities. 21.9% of Porto Recanati's population is foreign-born, the highest percentage in the region of Marche and among the highest in Italy.

The building has a gritty reputation and is notorious locally as a magnet for crime and narcotics. In April 2018, police discovered human remains in a well near Hotel House during a drug investigation. The remains were found to belong to a teenager who disappeared in 2010; forensic evidence led authorities to her alleged boyfriend, a foreign-born Hotel House resident, but despite an investigation no charges were laid and the suspect's whereabouts are now unknown.

== History ==
The building was constructed during a historic building boom, on what was then the outskirts of Porto Recanati, and was intended as tourist accommodations; however, as economic conditions changed, the apartments became occupied by low-income workers and families, mostly of foreign origin. As the area declined, services deteriorated because of non-payment of utility bills, causing sanitation issues severe enough to trigger an investigation by the European Parliament. Open drug dealing, controlled first by the Camorra and later by foreign gangs, exacerbated the area's social problems.

The building has been described as an eyesore because of its decrepitude and visual impact on the area's coastal scenery. In April 2014, the outgoing mayor of Porto Recanati, Rosalba Ubaldi, proposed demolishing Hotel House and constructing new housing in its place. In 2017, the regional government approved a resolution requesting funds from the state budget for redevelopment of the area. Politicians Matteo Salvini and Alessandra Mussolini have each visited Hotel House and supported its demolition and redevelopment.

The building's social conditions have been the subject of academic studies, publications, and documentary films.
