= Sant'Agostino, Montecosaro =

Church in Montecosaro, Marche, Italy

Coordinates: 43°19′01″N 13°38′08″E

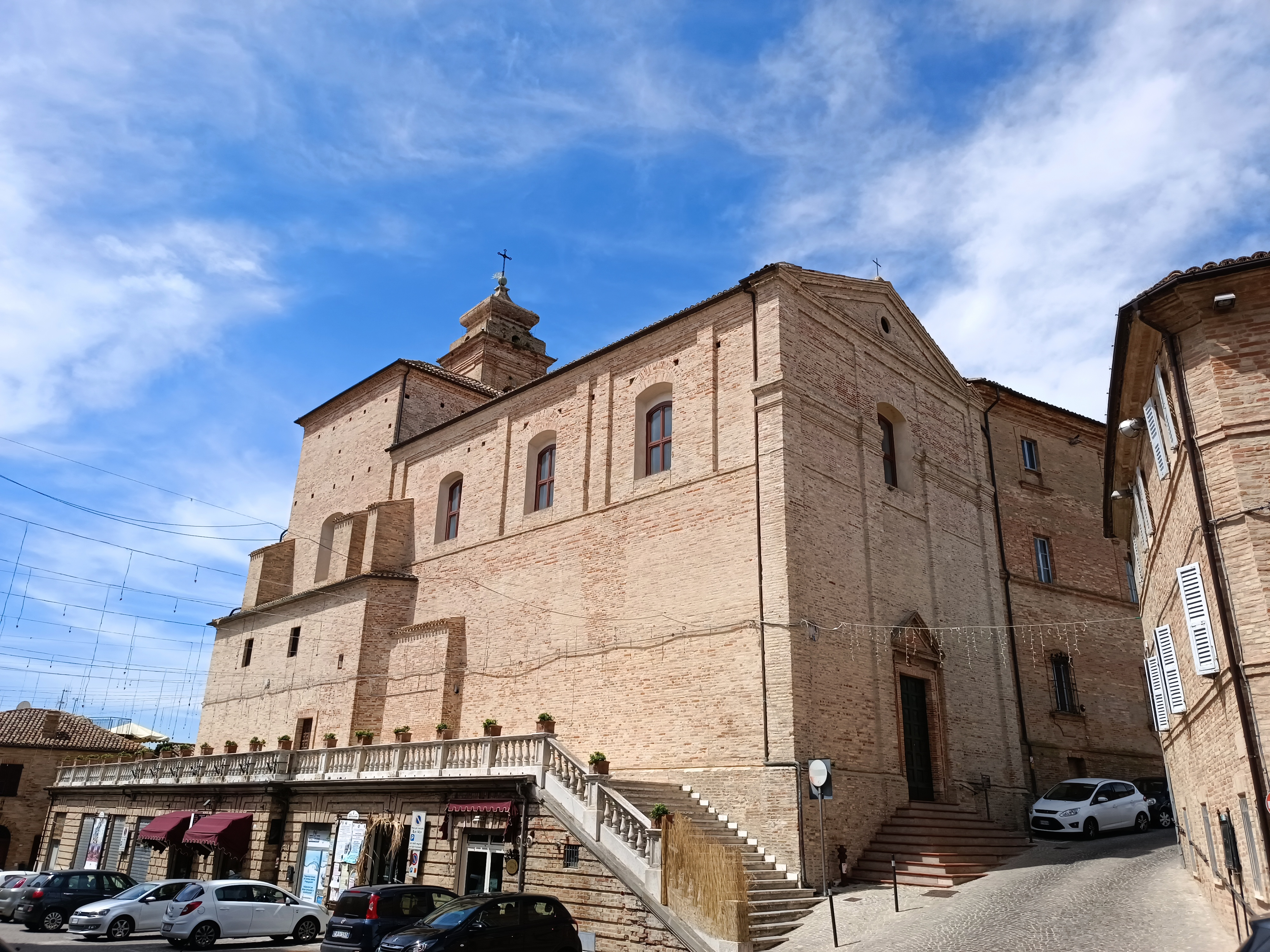

Sant'Agostino is a Roman Catholic church located on Via Antonio Gatti #2 flanking a balustrade along Piazza Trieste in Montecosaro, province of Macerata, in the region of Marche, Italy.

== History ==
The brick church was built originally circa 1200 and dedicated to San Martino. An adjacent Augustinian convent was the home of Saint Nicola da Tolentino for a year. Over the centuries it has undergone numerous reconstructions including a major one in the 16th century, and again in the 18th century. The piazza side has a staircase and balustrade added in 1927. The exterior generally lacks decoration; the nave has second story buttresses. Near the apse is a tall bell tower.

The interior was restored in 2003. It houses a silver and gilded Byzantine reliquary of the Holy Cross. The left wall has an organ built by Gaetano Callido in 1792. The wooden shutters have neoclassical paintings. In 2016, the church was closed for repairs, but in 2018 it was reopened to the public.
