= Sanctuary of Madonna dell'Acqua Santa, Morrovalle =

Church in Morrovalle, Italy

Coordinates: 43°18′59″N 13°34′33″E

The Sanctuary of the Madonna dell'Acqua Santa (Our Lady of the Holy Water) is a small Roman Catholic church or Marian shrine located on the Strada Provinciale #10, just outside of the town of Morrovalle, province of Macerata, region of Marche, Italy.

== History ==
The small brick church was built at the site of a small chapel dedicated to Saint Mary of the Snows, putatively named due to a snowfall on January 5 in the distant past. Tradition holds that three leprous individuals entered town through the gate of the Porta di Sant'Agostino but found no hospitality. Sheltering in the chapel, they prayed to the Virgin. In their dreams they had a vision of the Madonna urging them to bathe in the spring outside the temple. After doing so, they putatively healed, leading the town to erect the present shrine. The design was commissioned in 1697 by Girolamo Lazzarini. Adjacent to the church was a dormitory for pilgrims. There is a roadside aedicule. In 1722, the church was made a chapel under the patronage of the Lazzarini.

The interiors of the walls have numerous ex-voto paintings from subsequent centuries. The church held the remains of Pier Francesco Greci, brother of Fausto Greci who restored the church in 1880.
