= Porto Potenza Picena =

- Frazione
- Location of Porto Potenza Picena in Italy
- Coordinates: 43°22′00″N 13°41′39.36″E
- Country: Italy
- Region: Marche
- Province: Macerata (MC)
- Comune: Potenza Picena
- Elevation: 3 m (9.8 ft)

Population (2001)
  - Total: 7,154
- Demonym: Portopotentini
- Time zone: UTC+1 (CET)
  - Summer (DST): UTC+2 (CEST)
- Postal code: 62018
- Dialing code: 0733
- Patron saint: Saint Anne
- Saint day: 26 July
- Website: Official website

A view of Porto Potenza Picena.

Porto Potenza Picena, also spelled Porto Potenza, is an Italian village, the most populated civil parish (frazione) of the municipality of Potenza Picena in the Province of Macerata, Marche region. As of 2001 census its population was of 7,154.

== Geography ==
The town is located on the Adriatic coast, between Porto Recanati (9 km far) and Civitanova Marche (8 km). It is 8,5 km far from Potenza Picena, 36 from Macerata and Ancona. Between Porto Potenza and Civitanova is situated the estuary of the river Asola.

== Tourism ==
Porto Potenza Picena, along with Porto Recanati and Civitanova Marche is one of the sea resorts within the Province of Macerata. Due to the quality of its beaches it received the "Blue Flag" certifications from 2008 to 2011.

== Transport ==
Porto Potenza is served by the State Highway SS 16 "Adriatica" (Padua-Otranto) and crossed by the A14 motorway Bologna-Taranto. Nearest exits are "Loreto-Porto Recanati" in the north and "Civitanova-Macerata" in the south.

Potenza Picena-Montelupone railway station, on the Ancona-Pescara railway, is located in the middle of the town.
