= Giordano Macellari =

Italian painter (born 1962)

Giordano Macellari (born December 31, 1962) is an Italian painter.

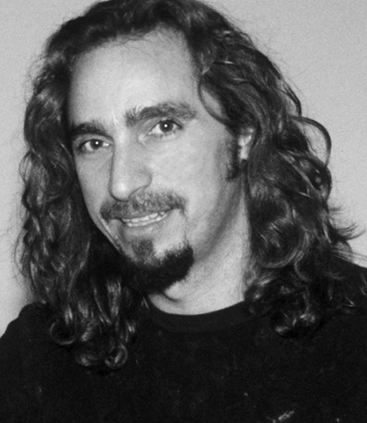
Giordano Macellari (2003).

== Biography ==
Giordano Macellari was born in Potenza Picena, Italy, on December 31, 1962. In 1968 the family moved to Casette d'Ete, not far from his city of birth.

Self-taught, he began to paint in the 1980s. He worked both as a painter and footwear entrepreneur until 2002, when he decided to devote himself exclusively to painting. By choice, he exhibited his works to the public only after this decision. The first solo exhibition was held in 2003 at the Palace of the Captains of Ascoli Piceno (Italy). In the same year Macellari exhibited in various places in Italy. The following year, 2004, he exhibited with a solo show in New York at the Ward-Nasse Gallery. In the three following years Macellari participated in about twenty exhibitions.

Among the most important, in addition to the aforementioned solo-exhibition in New York City, he made a solo-exhibition in the "White Room" at the Reggia di Caserta, a solo-exhibition in Porto Alegre, Brazil, at the "Casa de Cultura Mario Quintana", where Macellari was chosen from more than one hundred candidates. Macellari also participated in the 27th Shanghai Art Fair 2007, exhibiting his works through Nancy's Gallery of Shanghai. Macellari made other group exhibitions in New York and in Brazil. In 2004 he participated in the Biennale of Arts of the Unification of Italy, held at the Royal Palace of Caserta (Reggia di Caserta).

In Italy he exhibited in Milan, Venice, Rome, Ancona, Civitanova Marche, Sant'Elpidio a Mare, Montelupone, Piombino, Teano. Most exhibitions in Italy have been curated by the art historian Stefano Papetti.

== Projects ==
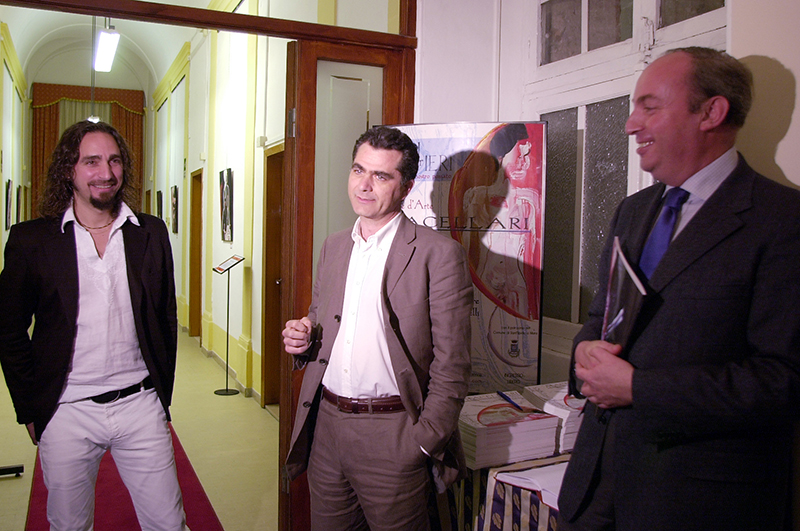
Giordano Macellari (left), Antonio Santori (center) e Stefano Papetti (right), 2005

Giordano Macellari is the creator of the art project entitled Oggi per ieri (Today for yesterday). The project aims to recover works of art of the past. Following the exposure of Giordano Macellari, held at the Pinacoteca Civica Vittore Crivelli of Sant'Elpidio a Mare (Italy), curated by Stefano Papetti and with the participation of Antonio Santori, in 2006 it was possible to restore the Marriage of Virgin, an altarpiece of 180x300 cm, located in the Church of San Filippo Neri (Sant'Elpidio a Mare). Following the cleanup, which took place under the supervision of the Superintendent of the artistic heritage in the Marche, The restorer showed the signature Alexander Ricci firmanus pinxit 1801, son of the artist Filippo Ricci, a student in Rome of Francesco Trevisani. The project Oggi per ieri (Today for yesterday) also allowed in the City of Montelupone. Through this project, the Municipality of Montelupone has received for free a work of the painter Corrado Pellini. Corrado Pellini is a Montelupone artist who died prematurely in 1934 at only 26 years old. The work had been acquired at the time by the Futurist Ivo Pannaggi, directly from Corrado Pellini. The heirs today sold this work (work paid thanks to the project Oggi per ieri (Today for yesterday) which was placed at the Pinacoteca Corrado Pellini in Montelupone.

== Curiosity ==
=== New York ===
In 2004 Giordano Macellari stayed for two months in New York City as the guest of an old friend. Macellari reciprocated the hospitality by painting over 500 white shirts that had previously been unsaleable. The shirts, unsigned, were all sold in a short time by his friend in his stores, as simple shirts and not as works of art.

In the same period Giordano Macellari painted 44 paintings in New York proposing to carry out each work in just seven minutes.

=== Brazil ===
In 2003, during a stay of three months in Brazil, Giordano Macellari painted a series of portraits of women.

=== Venezuela ===
In 2002, the dividing point between the old and the new life, Giordano Macellari took a long trip to Venezuela. He painted a series of portraits of women, inspired by girls known onsite.

== Works ==
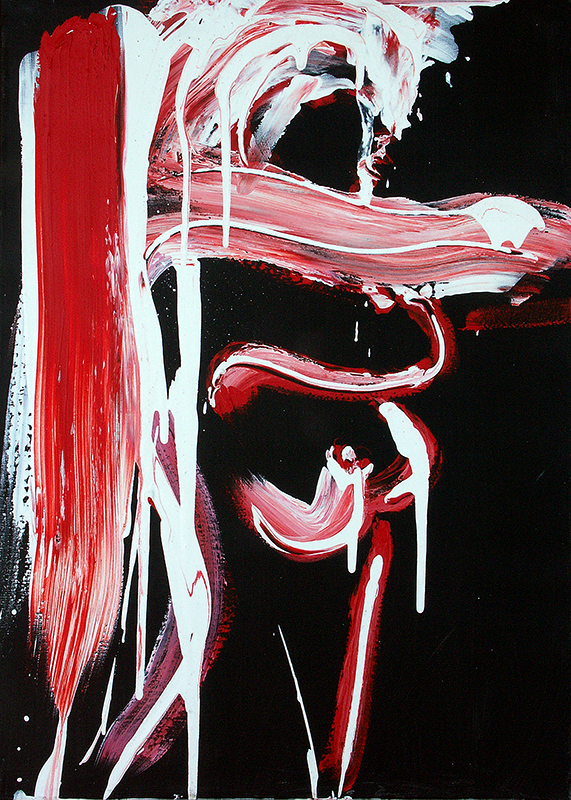
Giordano Macellari - Nudo Nero X0181NNAT, 2003 - Acrylic on canvas, 50x70cm

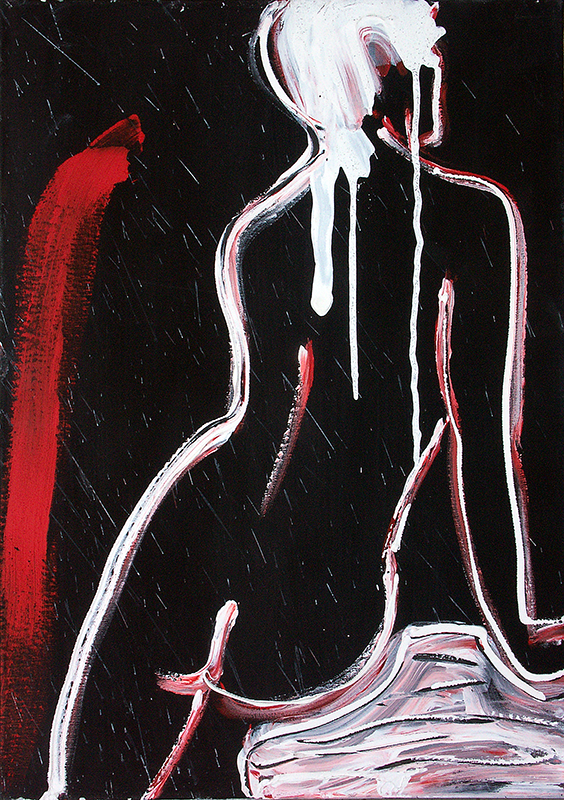
Giordano Macellari - Nudo Nero X0180NNAT. 2003 - Acrylic on canvas, 50x70cm

- Nudo Nero, X0182NNAT - acrilico su tela - cm 50x70
- Nudo Nero, X0458NNAT - acrilico su tela - cm 90x60
- Crocifissione, X0341ASAT - acrilico su tela - cm 120x80
- Crocifissione, X0340ASAT - acrilico su tela - cm 70x50
- Crocifissione, X0339ASAL - acrilico su legno - cm 80x40,4x1,8
- Crocifissione, X0353ASAT - acrilico su tela - cm 80x120
- Cristo benedicente, X0345ASAT - acrilico su tela - cm 80x120
- Eco e Narciso, X0173NUAT - acrilico su tela - cm 70X120
- Leda e il cigno, X0074MIAT - acrilico su tela - cm 60X120
- Nadia, X0307RIAT - acrilico su tela - cm 80x120
- Maria, X0322RIAT - acrilico su tela - cm 60x120
- Tania, X0330RIAT - acrilico su tela - cm 80x120
- Il Mio Universo, X0383UNAT - acrilico su tela - cm 120x80
- Il Mio Universo, X0410UNAT - acrilico su tela - cm 120x80
- Il Mio Universo, X0408UNAT - acrilico su tela - cm 120x80
