= Basilica of Santa Maria a Pie' di Chienti =

Former Roman Catholic monastery and church in Marche, Italy

Coordinates: 43.2804°N 13.6398°E

The Basilica of Santa Maria at Pie' di Chienti was a former Roman Catholic monastery and church located in a rural site on the north bank of the Chienti river, just outside of the town of Montecosaro Scalo, in the province of Macerata, region of Marche, Italy. The church is also known as the Santissima Annunziata.

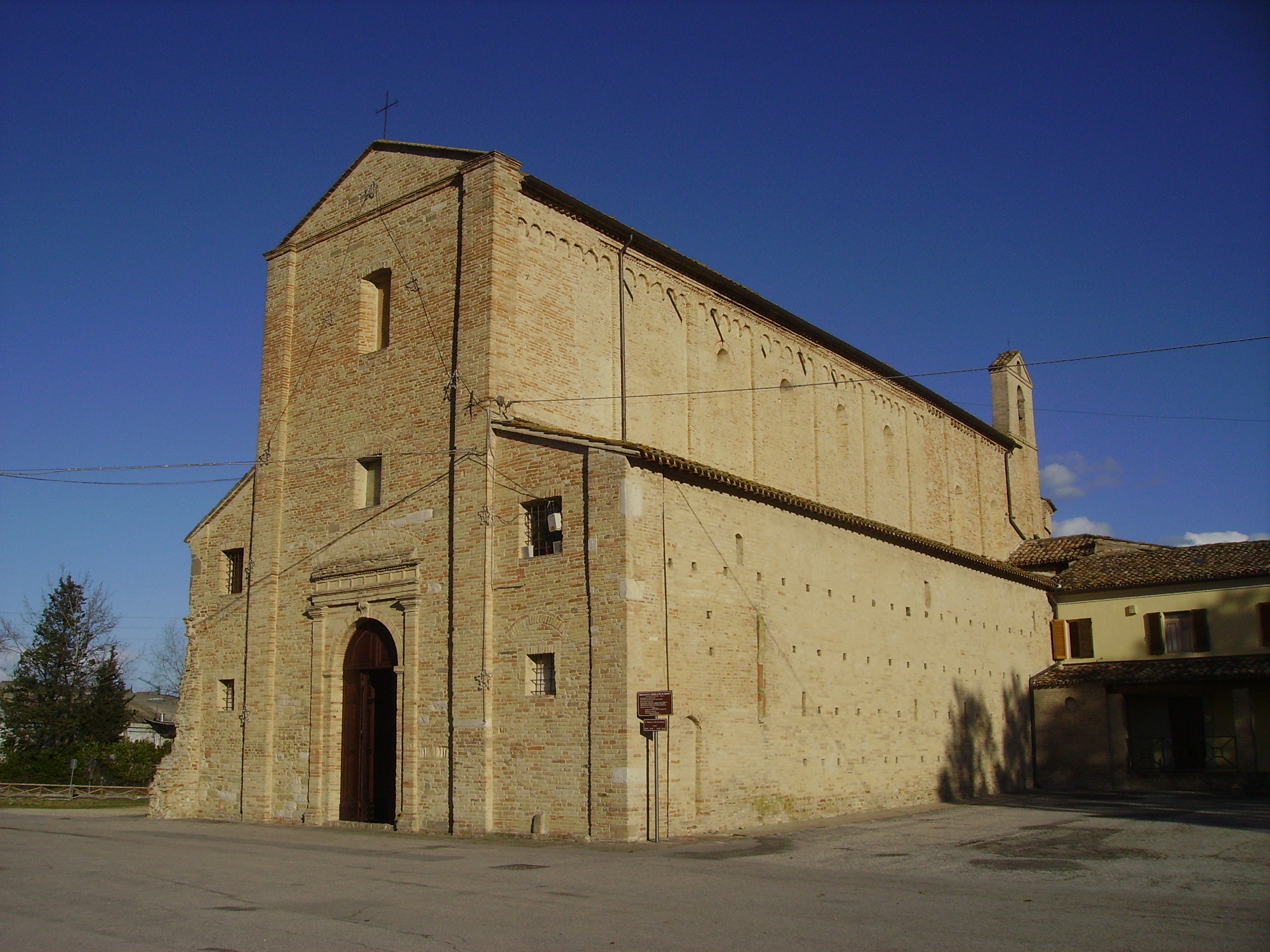
Façade of church.

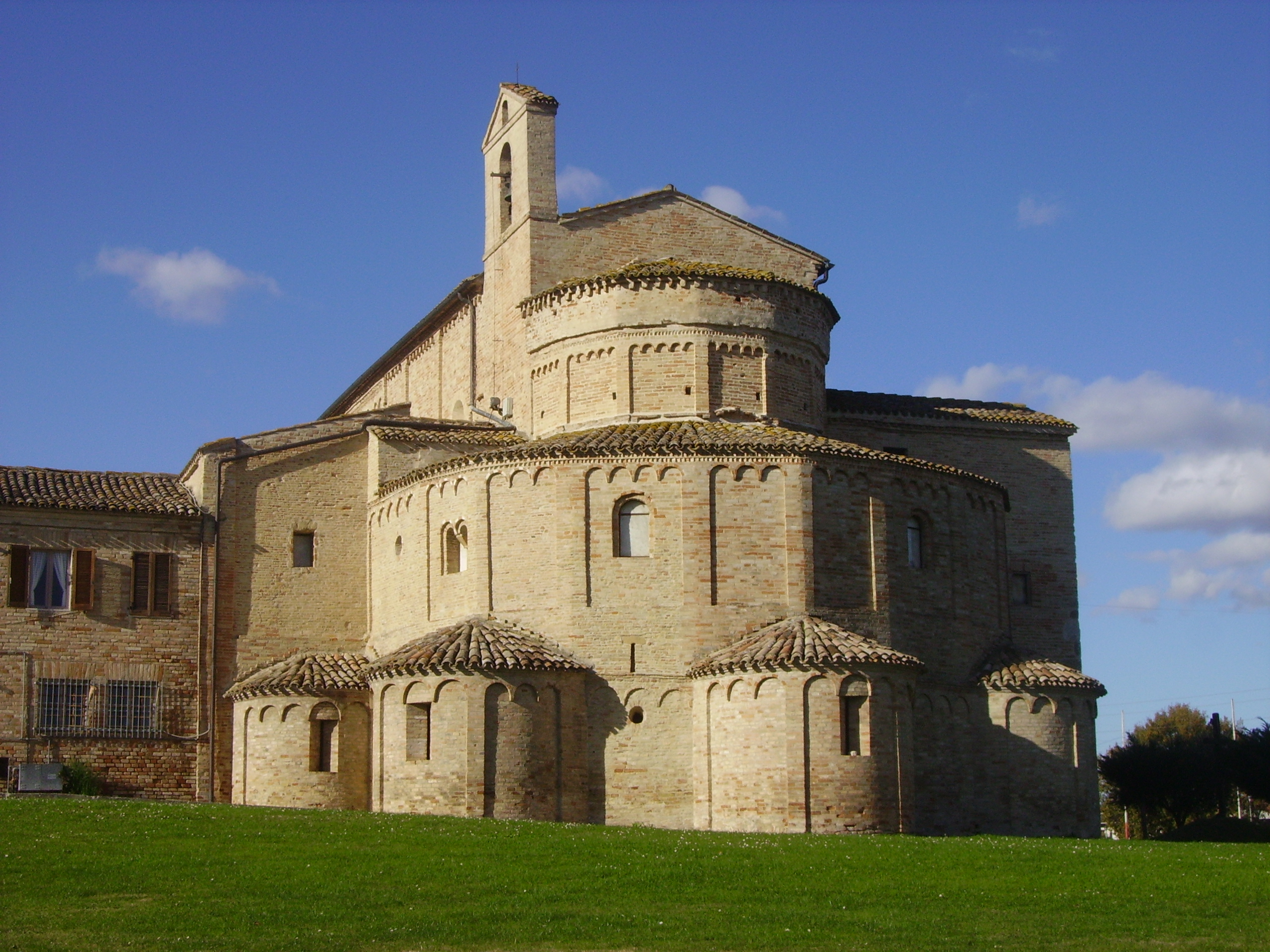
Semicircular apse of church, located on the east end of the church with small chapels.

== History ==
The monastery was founded in the 10th century, and remained under jurisdiction of the Abbey of Farfa until 1477. Documents cite the presence of an abbey by 936. The pope Sixtus IV transferred the property to the order of the Ospedale di Santa Maria della Pietà of Camerino.

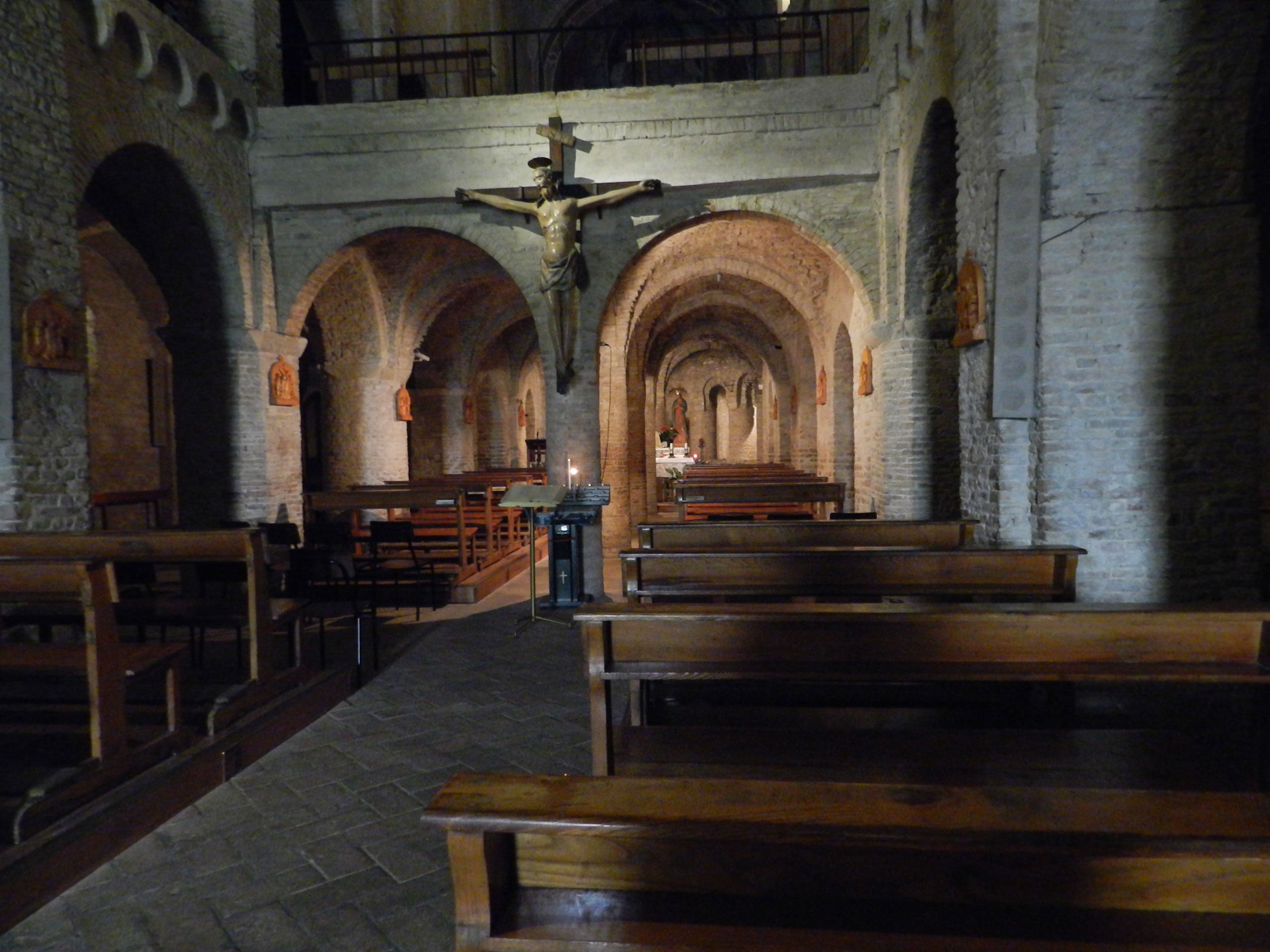
Interior nave.

The Romanesque stone church we see today was rebuilt in 1125 by the Lombard abbot Agenolfo or Adenolfo. An earthquake in that era caused the upper portions of the church to collapse. The church once had a lower crypt, above an elevated presbytery and three radial chapels emerging from the apse. The perimeter of the apse had an ambulatory that allowed lay visitors to walk without disturbing the cloistered monks in the central choir space. The interior has a basilica layout with a nave and two aisles. The church has undergone some refurbishments over the centuries. The interior still retains a 15th-century wooden crucifix and medieval frescoes.
