= Potenza (river) =

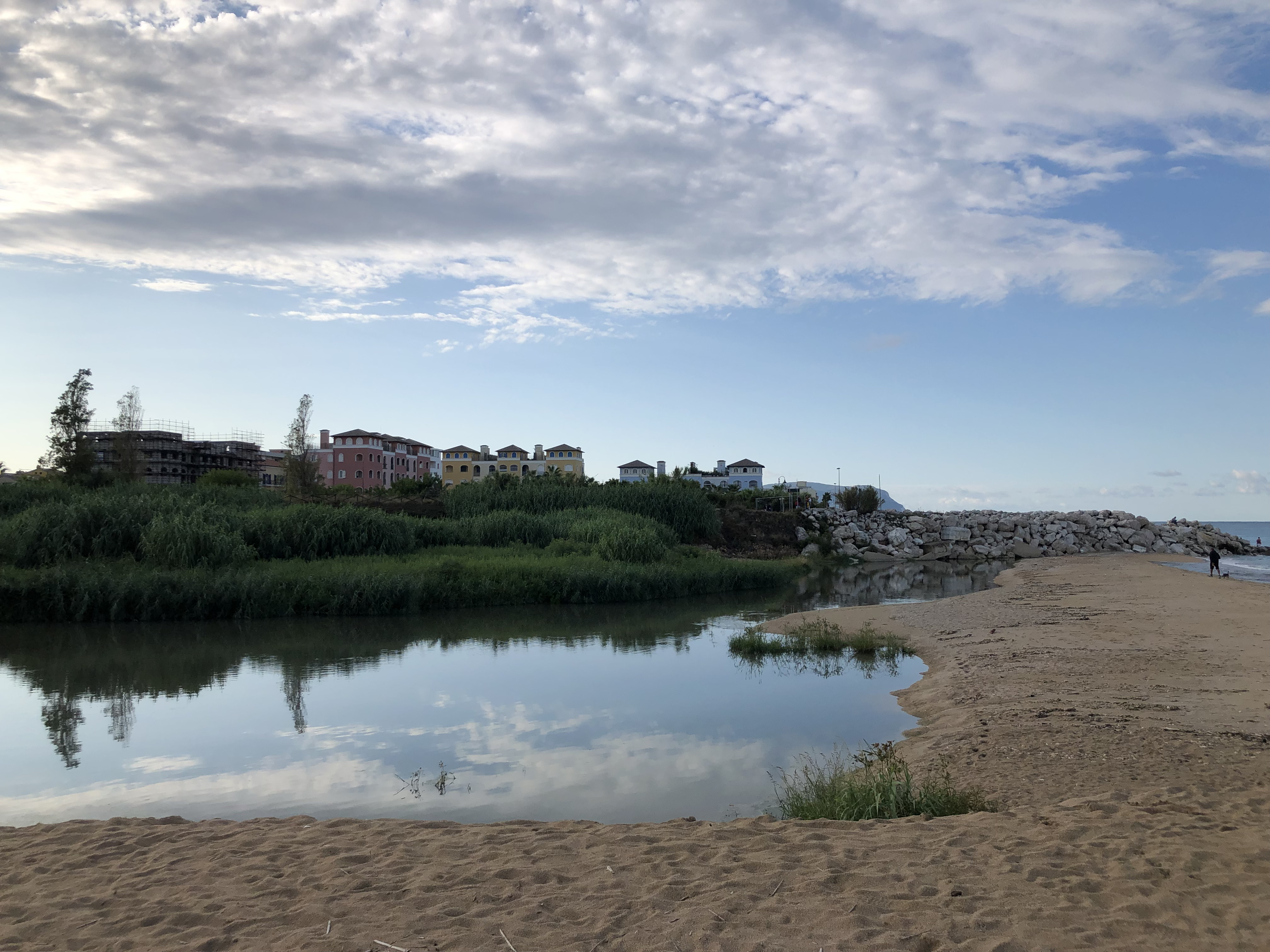
- The river's mouth at Porto Recanati.

Location
- Country: Italy

Physical characteristics
- Source
  - location: Fiuminata
  - elevation: 800 m (2,600 ft)
- Mouth: Adriatic Sea
  - location: Porto Recanati
  - coordinates: 43.4238°N 13.6705°E
- Length: 95 km (59 mi)
- Discharge
  - average: 6 m^{3}/s (210 cu ft/s)

The Potenza (Latin: Flosis) is a river in the province of Macerata in the Marche region of Italy. The source of the river is in the territory of Fiuminata. The source is located at an elevation of 800 metres (2,600 ft) on Monte Pennino. The river flows northeast through the communes of Pioraco, Castelraimondo, San Severino Marche, Macerata, Montelupone, Recanati and Potenza Picena. The river flows into the Adriatic Sea at Porto Recanati, after a course of some 95 kilometres (59 mi).
