= Montecosaro =

- Comune
- Comune di Montecosaro
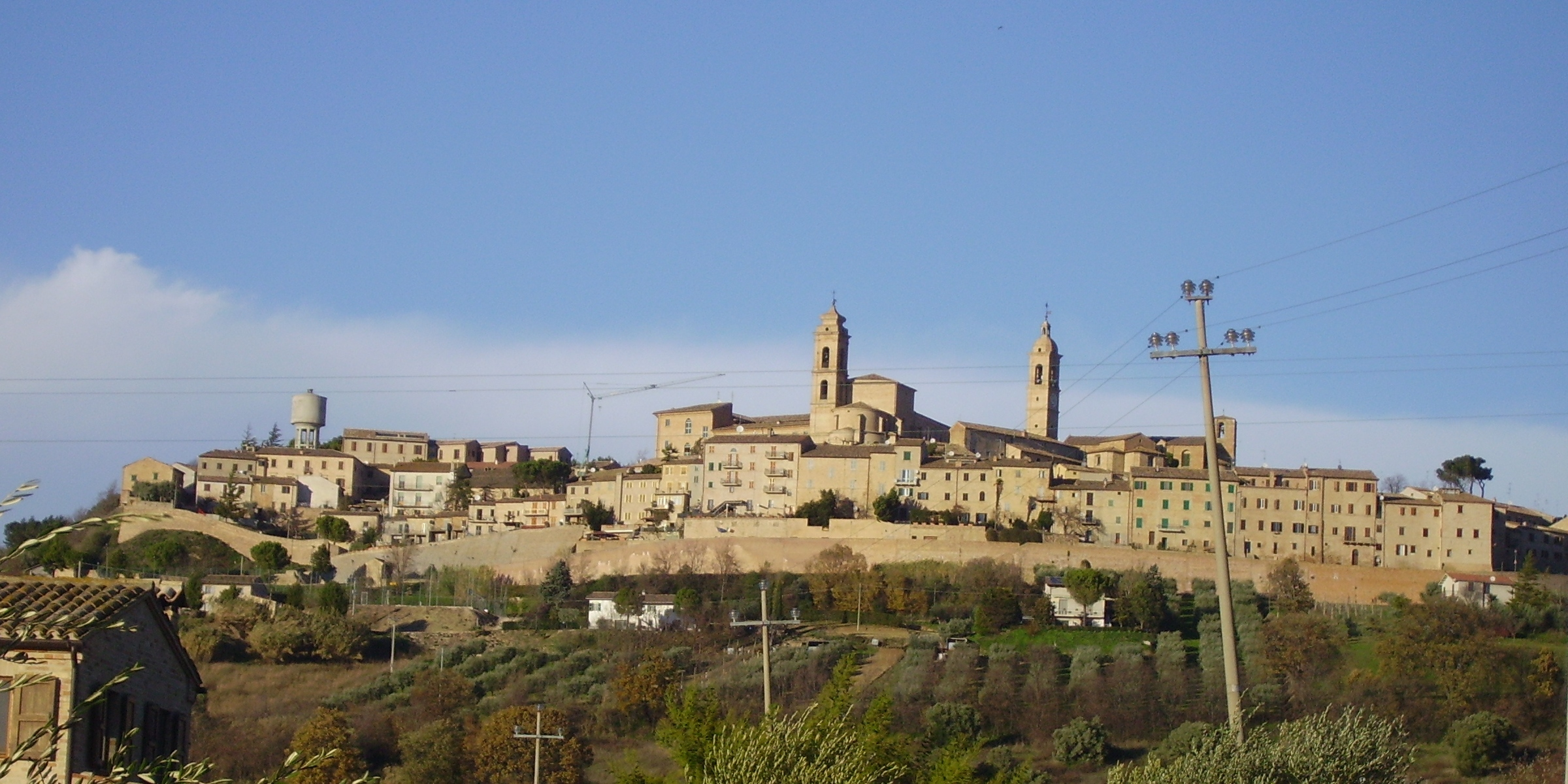
- The old part of the town stands on a hill

- Coat of arms

- Location within Italy Location within Marche
- Coordinates: 43°19′N 13°38′E
- Country: Italy
- Region: Marche
- Province: Macerata (MC)
- Frazioni: Crocette-Molino, Montecosaro Scalo (formerly Borgo stazione)

Government
  - Mayor: Lorella Cardinali

Area
  - Total: 21.7 km^{2} (8.4 sq mi)
- Elevation: 252 m (827 ft)

Population (31 December 2010)
  - Total: 6,826
  - Density: 315/km^{2} (815/sq mi)
- Demonym: Montecosaresi
- Time zone: UTC+1 (CET)
  - Summer (DST): UTC+2 (CEST)
- Postal code: 62010
- Dialing code: 0733
- Patron saint: St. Lawrence of Rome
- Saint day: August 10
- Website: Official website

Montecosaro is a comune (municipality) in the Province of Macerata in the Italian region Marche, located about 35 kilometres (22 mi) southeast of Ancona and about 15 kilometres (9 mi) east of Macerata.

Montecosaro borders the following municipalities: Civitanova Marche, Montegranaro, Montelupone, Morrovalle, Potenza Picena, Sant'Elpidio a Mare. It is one of I Borghi più belli d'Italia ("The most beautiful villages of Italy").

Among the religious buildings in the town are:

- Santa Maria a Pie’ di Chienti: church rebuilt in 1125 in Romanesque style.
- Sant'Agostino: Romanesque church rebuilt starting in 16th century.

== Notable people ==
- Anita Cerquetti (1931-2014), operatic soprano
- Romolo Marcellini (1910-1999), film director
