= Chiesa della Banderuola, Porto Recanati =

Roman Catholic chapel in Marche, Italy

Coordinates: 43°27′05.8″N 13°37′46.0″E

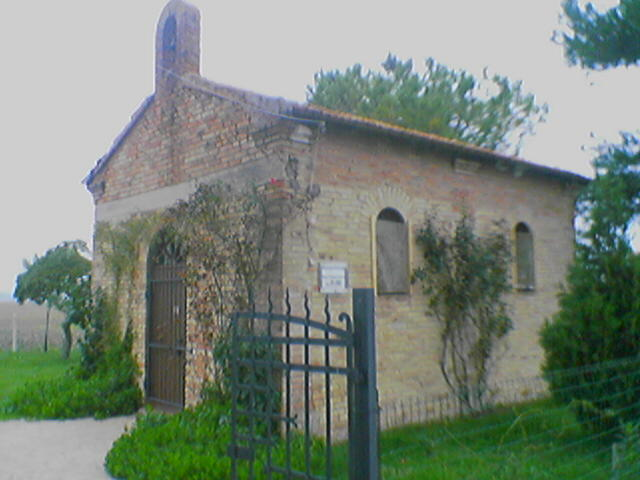
Chiesa della Banderuola, Porto Recanati

The Chiesetta della Banderuola (Little church of the windvane) is a small, Roman Catholic Marian shrine chapel within the town limits of Porto Recanati, province of Macerata, region of Marche, Italy.

== History ==
The little brick chapel shrine has a peculiar history, linked to the resurgence of Marian devotions in the mid-19th century. The present church, although appearing older, was erected in 184 using a design by the architect Pietro Pasquali. Tradition held that this locale was the Italian transitory port of arrival in 1294 for the miraculous transportation of the Santa Casa di Loreto, to which the small church now bears a resemblance. Documents site that by 1467, neighbors had erected a wall to memorialize the event. The area was called Bandirola or Banderuola, since it appeared to have windvane to signal to pilgrims arriving by sea of the road to Loreto. Further documents in 1561 refer to restoration of the wall. In 1844, Pope Pius IX approved a much grander project, but bureaucratic wrangling restricted it to the small chapel. The present church was rebuilt in 1939-1940.
