= San Bartolomeo, Morrovalle =

Church in Morrovalle, Italy

Coordinates: 43°18′52″N 13°34′45″E

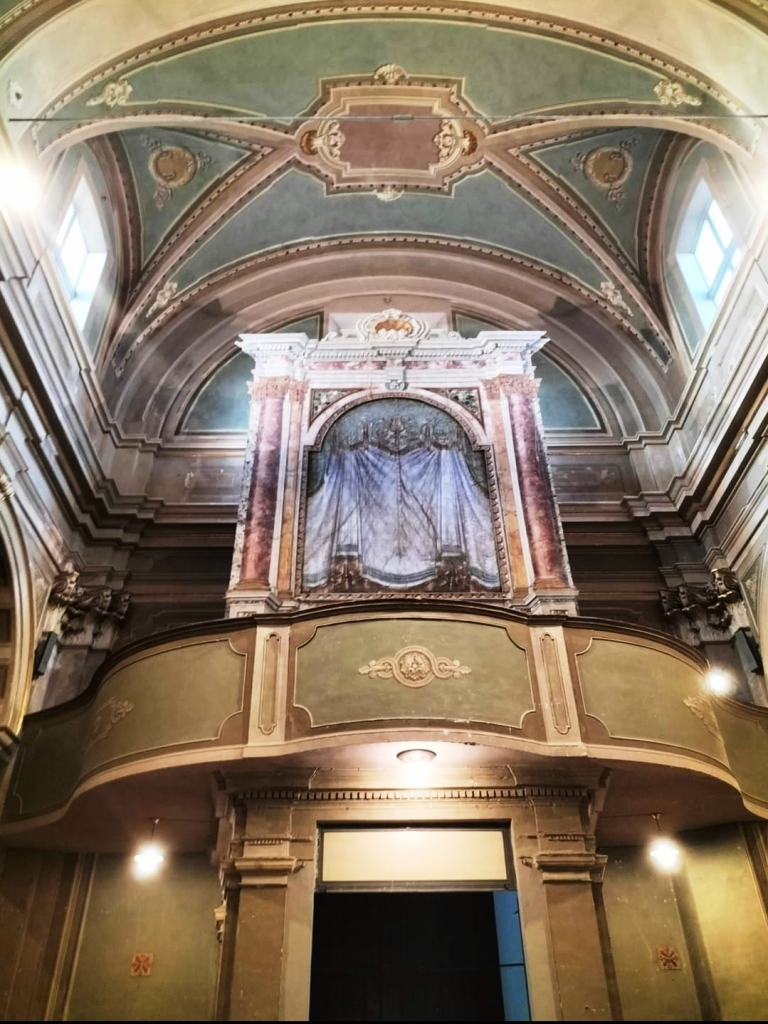

The Collegiata di San Bartolomeo is a Roman Catholic church located in Morrovalle, province of Macerata, in the region of Marche, Italy.

== History ==
Erection of a collegiate church was begun in 1586 under patronage of Pope Sixtus V, and required the fusion of the parishes of San Venanzo, Sant'Angelo, and San Pietro. In 1750 a reconstruction, enlarged the church, and led to the present layout with a single nave and lateral chapels. The transept is short, and the apse semicircular. The present nave decoration dates to the late 19th century. The exterior, mostly brick, is articulated with two stories of pilasters and a central triangular tympanum, the roofline has four flanking spires and a central cross. The central façade window is made of white stone with a balustrade, while the main portal has a rounded arch and triangular tympanum. At the rear of the church is a tall bell tower.

The interior of the church contains a number of works derived from the nearby suppressed Franciscan church and convent. It contains a relic of a 1560 Eucharistic Miracle that was approved as a miracle in a bull by Pope Pius IV. In addition, the church houses remains or relics of the Blessed Masseo of San Severino, once buried in the Franciscan church, and relics of St Bartholomew the Apostle, St Ursula, and the Saint Martyr Valentinian.

The organ was completed by the Callido family. The church has a crucifix donated in 1498 by Cesare Lazzarini who received it in 1494 from Cardinal Francesco Piccolomini, Pope Pius III.
