= Sant'Agostino, Morrovalle =

Church in Morrovalle, Italy

Coordinates: 43°18′52″N 13°34′48″E

Sant'Agostino is a Roman Catholic church located in the center of the old town of Morrovalle, province of Macerata, in the region of Marche, Italy.

== History ==
The name of the church and the adjacent Augustinian convent imply that the present structures were likely preceded by older, Romanesque or Gothic, buildings. The present brick church, in a subdued Baroque-style dates to the 17th century. It faces, at an angle, the main square (Piazza Vittorio Emanuele) in the town with a tall bell tower with clock and city hall to the left. The two story façade has a rectangular second story window and flanking brick giant pilasters lacking decoration. The portal has the only decoration in the façade with a white stone triangular pediment with a coat of arms and a semicircular steps.

The interior has a single rectangular nave illuminated by large windows. The present church was restored after severe damage during World War II. The interiors contain:

- Madonna delle Grazie (14th-century) derived from a former neighboring Franciscan church.
- Contemplation attributed to a follower of Federigo Barocci.
- Crucifix (circa 1500).
- Organ over the entrance portal.
