= San Giovanni Battista, Porto Recanati =

Church in Porto Recanati, Italy

Coordinates: 43.43435°N 13.663028°E

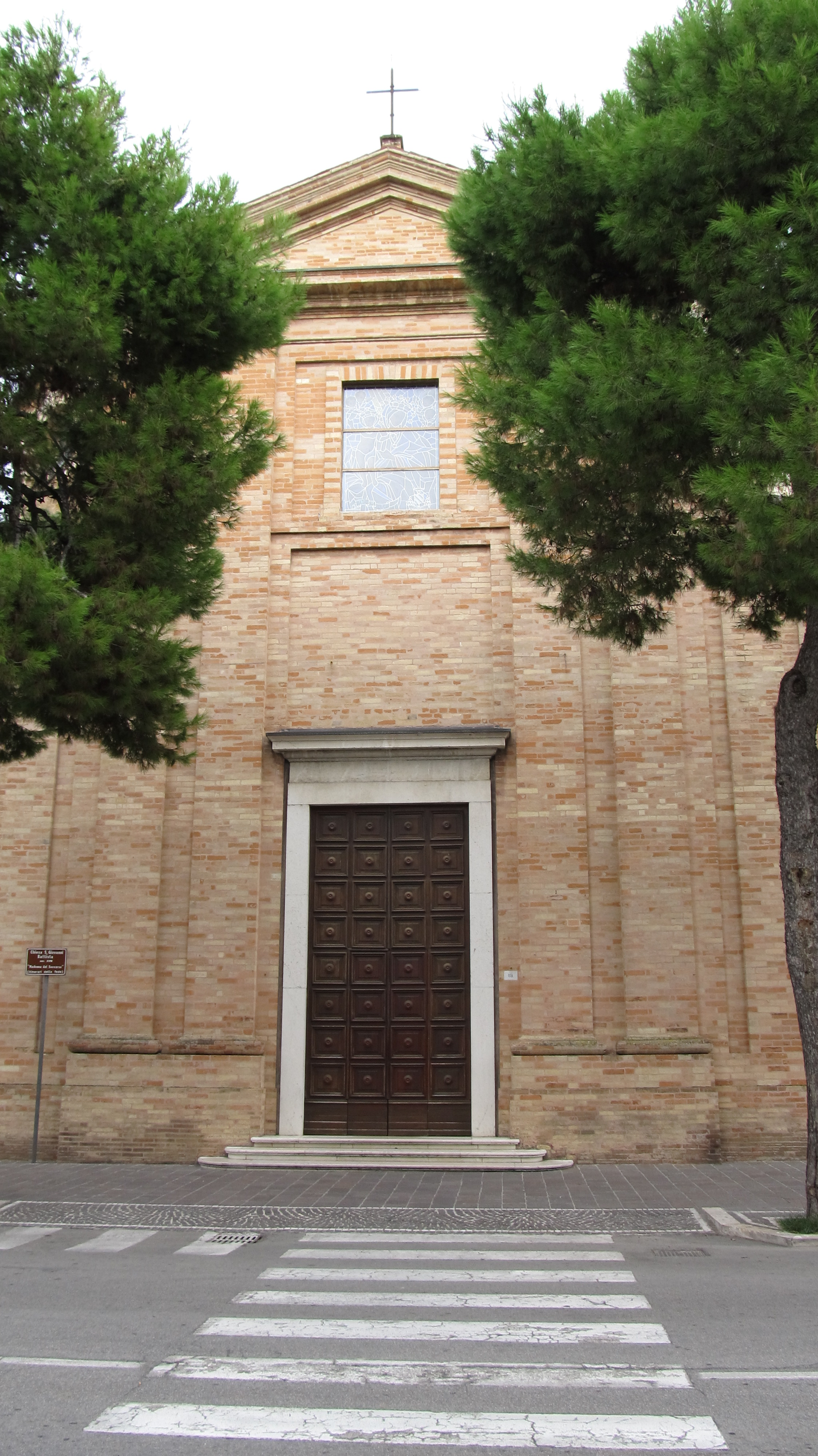
S.Giovanni Battista

San Giovanni Battista is a Neoclassic-style, Roman Catholic church located on Corso Giacomo Matteotti in the town of Porto Recanati, province of Macerata, region of Marche, Italy.

== History ==
The town of Porto Recanati only gradually separated from Recanati. A medieval church was once found inside the castle of the town, dedicated also to St John the Baptist. In 1571, the church was elevated to a parish church. As the population grew, there was a need for a larger church. Plans for a larger church were drawn up in 1779, but instead of enlarging the constricted castle church, a new one was begun in 1784 and completed a year later at the cost of 6700 lire. The architect was Luigi Paglialunga from Fermo. The layout is octagonal. In 1804 new pilasters were added to support the roof. In 1828 the small castle church was razed and the materials used in the restoration of this church.

The 18th century frescoes in the church were covered over in the 19th century during restorations. The church houses a canvas by Baldassare Peruzzi depicting St John the Baptist and a 15th-century Madonna del Soccorso moved here in 1828 from the chapel of the Castello Svevo. It has 14 wooden statues depicting scenes of the Via Crucis.
