= Potenza Picena =

Comune in Marche, Italy

- Comune
- Comune di Potenza Picena
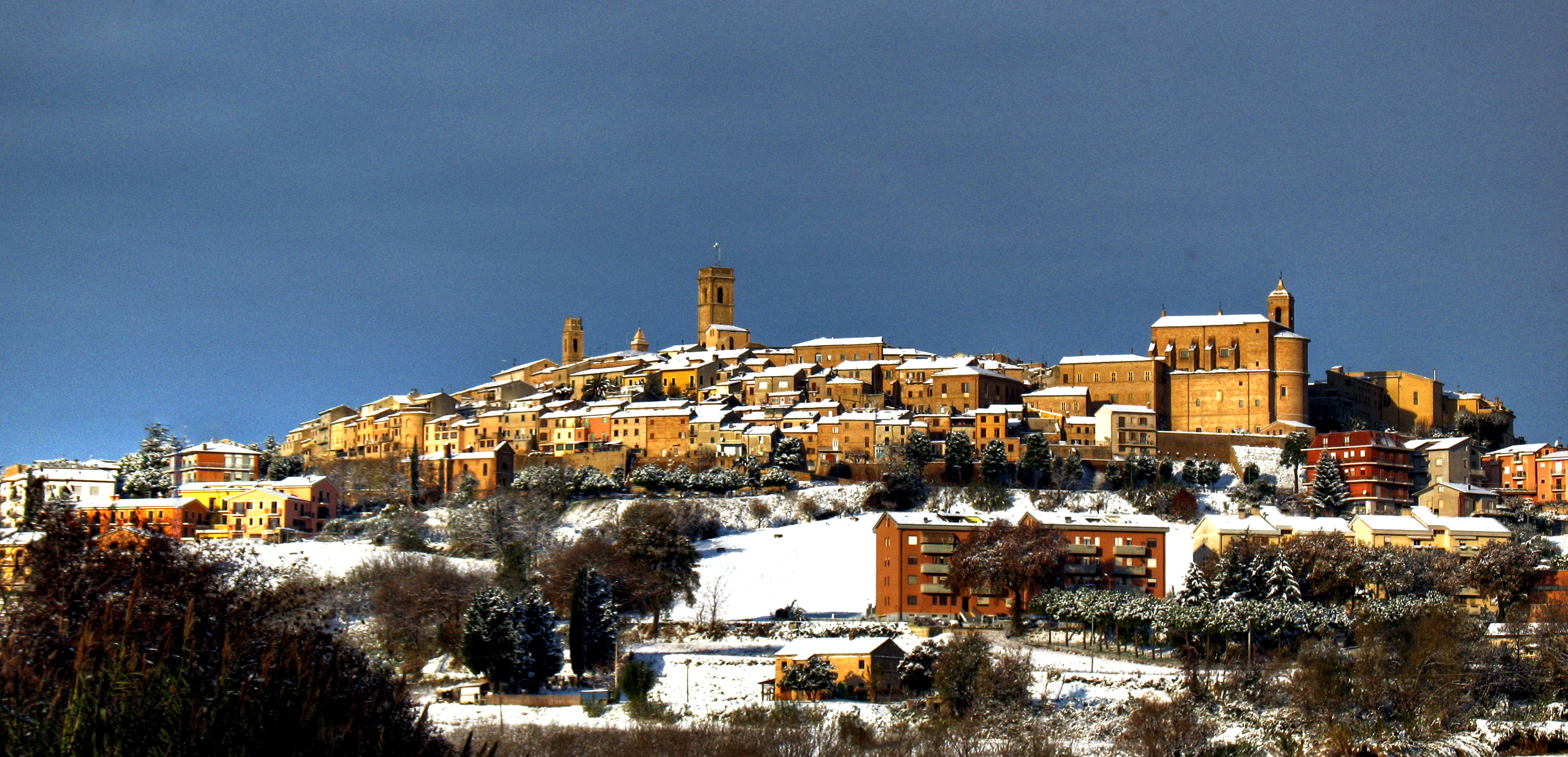

- Coat of arms

- Location within Italy Location within Marche
- Coordinates: 43°22′N 13°37′E
- Country: Italy
- Region: Marche
- Province: Macerata (MC)
- Frazioni: Montecanepino, Porto Potenza Picena, San Girio

Government
  - Mayor: Noemi Tartabini (lista civica)

Area
  - Total: 49 km^{2} (19 sq mi)
- Elevation: 237 m (778 ft)

Population (01-01-2024)
  - Total: 15,503
  - Density: 320/km^{2} (820/sq mi)
- Demonym(s): Potentini, Santesi
- Time zone: UTC+1 (CET)
  - Summer (DST): UTC+2 (CEST)
- Postal code: 62018
- Dialing code: 0733
- ISTAT code: 043043
- Patron saint: St. Stephen, St. Girio and St. Anne (for Porto Potenza Picena)
- Saint day: December 26 (St. Stephen), May 25 (St. Girio) and July 26 (St. Anne) for Porto Potenza Picena
- Website: Official website

Potenza Picena is a comune (municipality) in central Italy, situated in the Province of Macerata, in the Marche region. It has 15,503 residents.

Until 1862, it was called Monte Santo. The river Potenza flows nearby.

== Geography ==
=== Territory ===
The bordering municipalities are Civitanova Marche, Montecosaro, Montelupone, Porto Recanati and Recanati.

Modern Potenza Picena counts three frazioni: Porto Potenza Picena, San Girio and Montecanepino.

The town looks like a typical medieval village, perched on top of a hill, and surrounded by a ring of walls. Its monumental appearance is characterized by the presence of many churches (once 27) and their belfries.

Porto Potenza Picena (or just Porto Potenza) is the biggest inhabited area of the comune, situated in the area formerly occupied by a Roman settlement called Sacrata. It's a seaside resort with mainly sandy beaches interspersed with short cliff zones.

Montecanepino is located on a nearby hill. Its name derives from “canepini”, the rope-makers who used hemp (canapa in Italian) long ago.

San Girio consists of a reduced number of houses built around the Sanctuary of San Girio.

=== Climate ===
According to the Köppen climate classification, Potenza Picena belongs to the Sca subgroup, the typical Mediterranean climate, presenting both temperate and continental elements.

The territory, covering a wide area from the coast to the hinterlands, makes possible a great variance of temperature between the shores and the inland zones.

In general, the weather is mild for the great part of the year, with a brief sultry period during summer and short snowfalls during winter. Both in summer and winter there's a medium level of the humidity rate.

=== Hydrography ===
The river Potenza, known as Flosis during Ancient Rome times, passes through the province of Macerata and names the area as the Potenza Valley.

The river begins in Fiuminata, more precisely in Monte Vermenone, and flows in its wide valley for approximately 95 kms until it reaches the Adriatic Sea in Porto Recanati.

The river crosses the following main inhabited centres: Potenza Picena, Castelraimondo, San Severino Marche, Montelupone, Recanati e Porto Recanati.

Anciently, it has served as an essential path for commerce and communication. Even the poet Giacomo Leopardi may have sung its praises in his poem “La quiete dopo la tempesta” (The stillness after the thunderstorm).

== The origins of the name ==
The current name of Potenza Picena is quite recent. On the 21st of December 1862, the municipal council transformed the medieval name of Monte Santo to Potenza Picena. The history of the town is very ancient – in 184 BC it became a Roman colony (Potentia), later destroyed during the 5th century. In the early Middle Ages, it was rebuilt on a nearby hill as Monte or Castel San Giovanni. The emperor Henry V demolished it in 1116. After being reconstructed in 1128, it kept the name of Monte Santo until the current Potenza Picena was chosen in 1862.

The term "Potenza" clearly recalled the ancient and noble Roman town of Potentia, whose collapse and depopulation brought to the birth of the village of Monte Santo, in a safer and more inner territory. The addition of the adjective "Picena" was required not only by the need to diversify from the Lucanian administrative centre (Lucania was the ancient Basilicata, the Italian region whose most important town is Potenza), but also to remember that the Piceni inhabited this land, as testified by several archaeological findings and necropolis. Still today, the origin of the Piceni is mysterious and unknown. According to the legend, they reached these lands coming from Sabina (an ancient region located in central Italy) following the flight of a woodpecker, their sacred animal. The now abandoned Roman town Potentia was located along the central Adriatic Italian coast, near the modern town of Porto Recanati, in the province of Macerata. It was founded in 184 BC under the consulate of Publius Claudius Pulcher and Lucius Porcius Licinus, most likely between the Potenza river's mouth and the Abbey of Santa Maria.

== History ==
Potenza Picena takes its name from the ancient Potentia, a flourishing Roman colony whose first information dates to 184 BC. It was destroyed in the 6th century, during the Gothic war. Some of the survivors founded the village of Monte Santo on the adjacent hill, around the ancient parish church of Santo Stefano (Saint Stephen), that was situated on the highest spot (the current Piazza Matteotti). The most ancient document that testifies the existence of the parish church and the inhabited centre, both fiefs of the Fermo bishop, dates back to 947 AD.

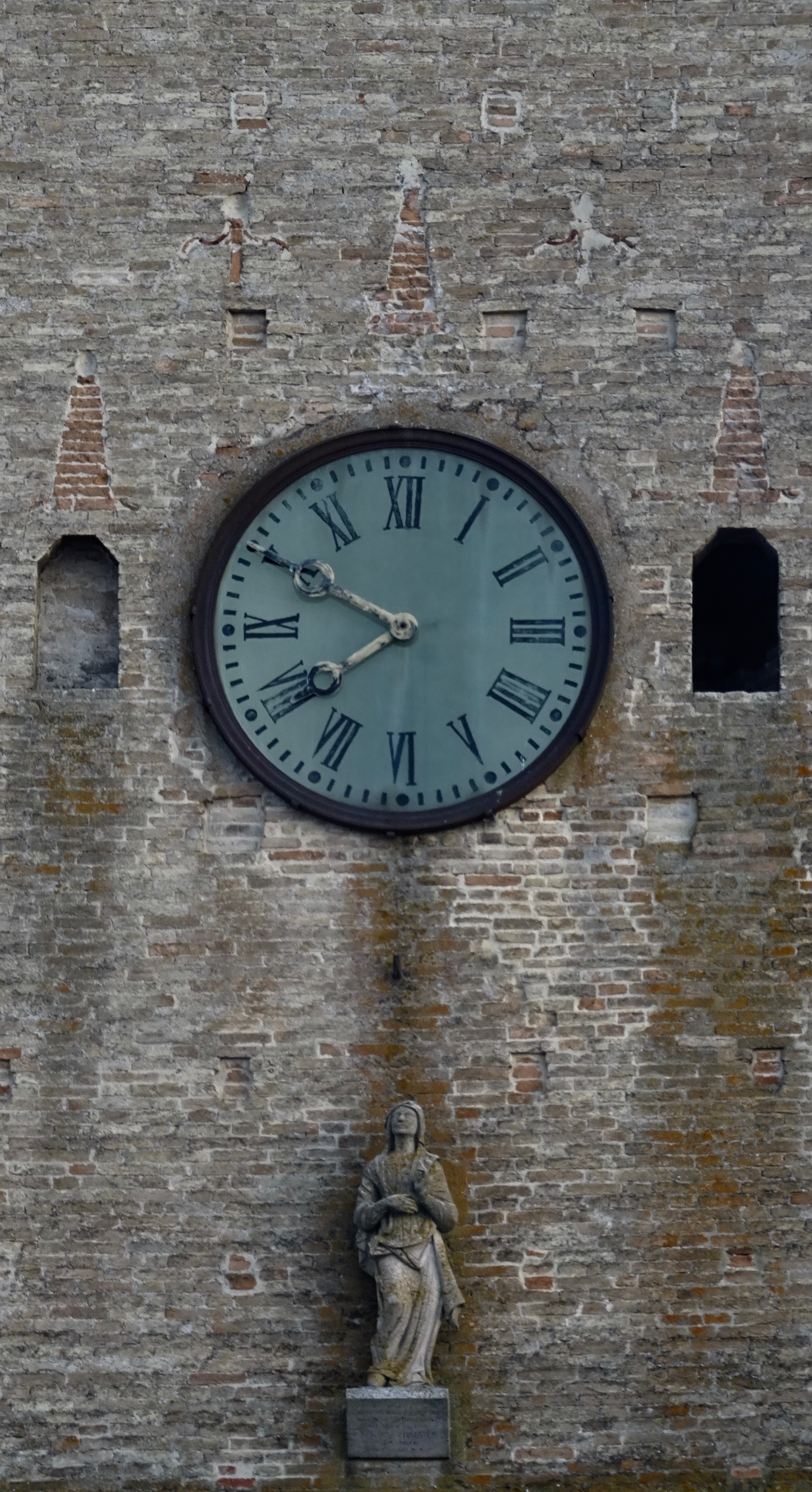
7:50 PM

Monte Santo gained independence as a comune (initially castrum) in the September of 1128, when Liberto, prelate of Fermo, refused the food supply the inhabitants owed to him and to preside over the tribunal of that time. Despite Monte Santo was released from the feudal subjection, the bishop had still handled the foreign issues and the law for over a century. Over the years, Monte Santo gained more and more freedom. In 1252, Pope Innocent IV granted the village the right to independently elect the podestà, who mainly had judicial duties. In 1376, Pope Gregory XI agreed on the so called “mero et mixto imperio” – the highest degree of verdict –, the capital penalty. In those years, several wars caused bloodshed to the region (the ancient Marca – a medieval Europe definition for a type of borderland – from which derives the current Marche), directly also involving Monte Santo: the municipal territory devastation carried out by the Ghibellines from Osimo, guided by the brothers Lippaccio and Andrea Guzzolini, dates back to 1318. In 1407, the population, sheltered in the walls’ bastions, prevented Lodovico Migliorati, Lord of Fermo, from entering the village. Along with his soldiers, he was attacked by verbal insults, arrows, javelins, and rocks.

The inhabited centre developed around the ancient Santo Stefano parish church, which, in 1796, was demolished in order to enlarge the municipal square where it was set. From that moment, public shows, games, and sport competitions were organised in this area – the most popular show was the “giostra del bue” (ox ride), also called “dello steccato” (fence ride), a sort of corrida with violent features, at such a stage that it was forbidden during the Napoleonic dominion.

=== The coat of arms ===
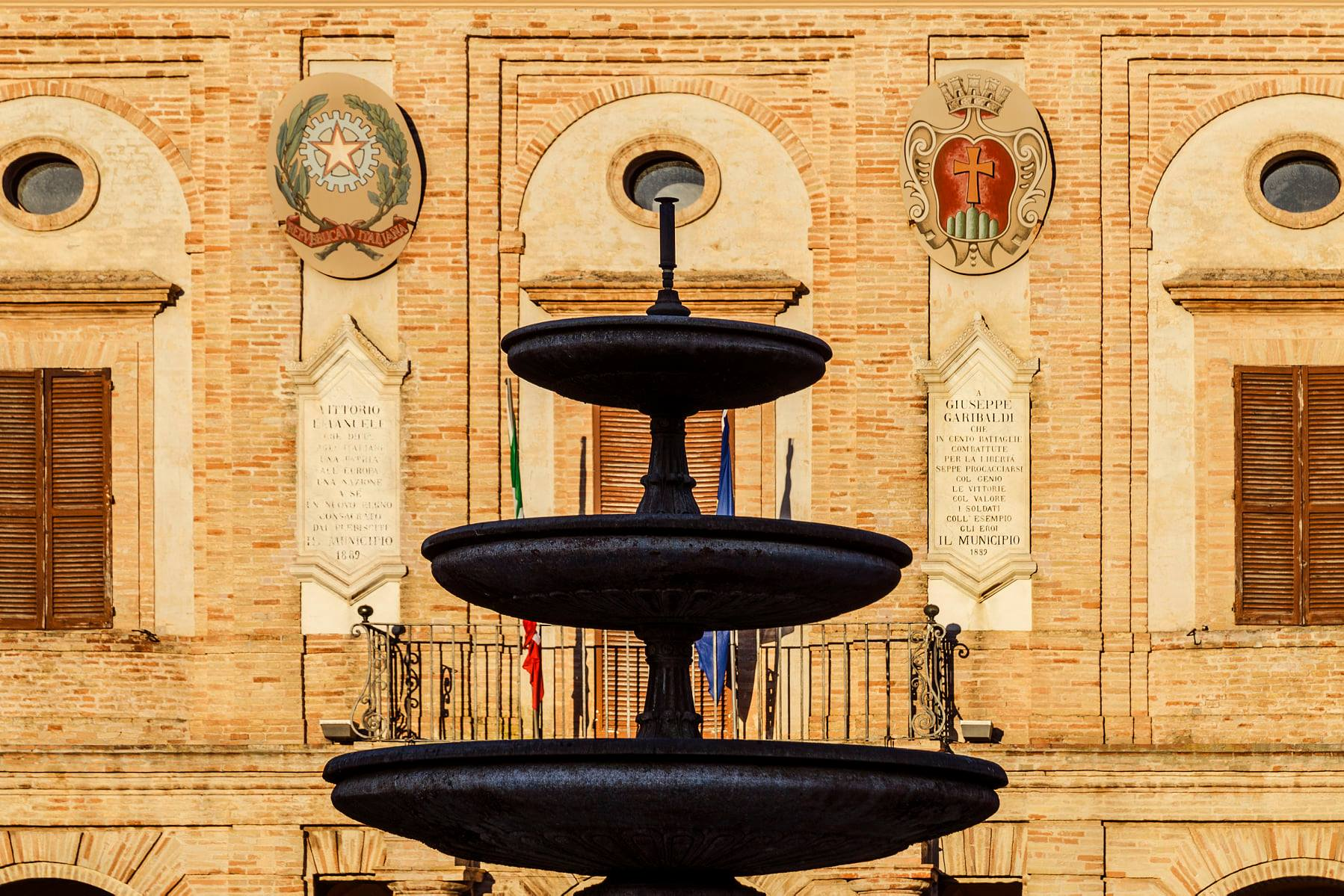
Fountain with municipal coat of arms in the background, removed in 2025

The municipal coat of arms of Potenza Picena is composed by a cross in a red field on top of five hills. According to the tradition, while the cross stands for Monte Santo, the hills represent five minor communities: Gerola (or Girola), Terchio (or Tergi), Sacrata (that reminds the near ancient Roman city never revived), Monte Coriolano (or Monte Grugliano) and Santara.

== Main sights ==
=== Religious architecture ===
Collegiata di Santo Stefano

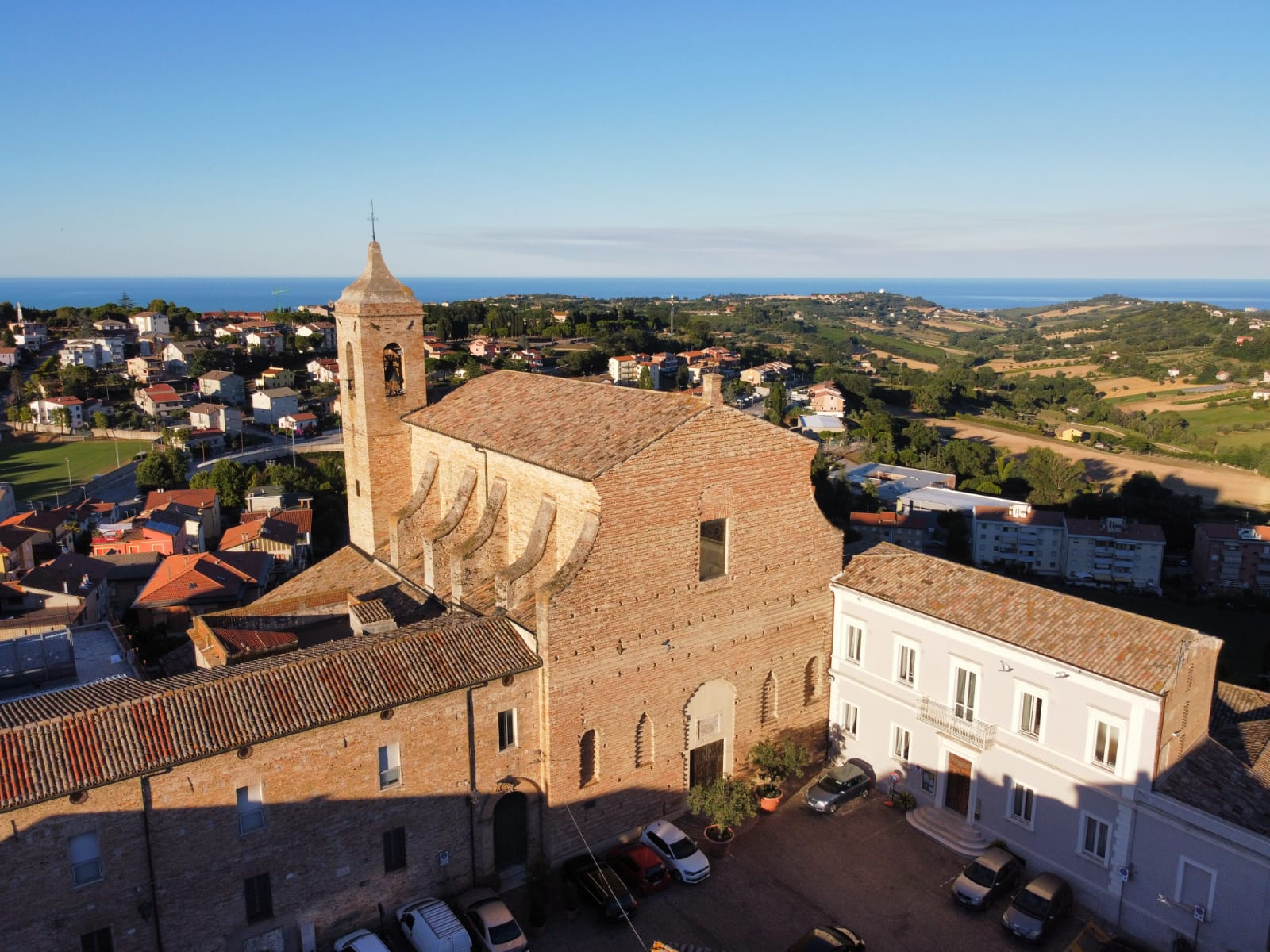
Collegiata di Santo Stefano

The Collegiate church of Saint Stephen was dedicated to Santo Ignazio (Saint Ignatius), founder of the Society of Jesus. The annexed building on the left side of the temple, now almost entirely used as lodging for the Daughters of Our Lady of Sorrows congregation and in a small part as a sacristy and meeting hall, was also the Jesuit college of Monte Santo until 1773, the year of the suppression of the Society of Jesus. The facade has remained unfinished. The peasant congregation (one of the two congregations of the Jesuits) arranged the underground crypt of the Collegiate church that lays below the entire building. The Chapel of the Peasants is completely frescoed, with decorative elements recalling the countryside and the peasant world, by Benedetto Biancolini, a painter from the Marche region. On the left we find the Chapel of the Artists, an important place of worship within the Collegiate church.

Chiesa della Madonna delle Grazie

The Church of Our Lady of Graces is located nearby San Giovanni's Gate (one of the three entrances to the village) and plays an important role in the Potenza Picena religious history. The temple stands where, originally, there was a votive niche, enlarged during the years due to the believers’ will. According to the tradition, the Madonna and Child depiction on the wall was narrated to distribute graces. In fact, the place was already mentioned as “Via Gratiarum” (Graces street) in the Municipal Statute of 1431.

Chiesa di San Giacomo

The Church of James the Great, located near the Galiziano Gate, dates to the second half of the 14th century. The construction development of the village and the church, and the officiation of the latter, are linked to the Corpus Christi confraternity, also called the San Giacomo confraternity. They also took care of a hospital reserved to poor and ill people, situated next to the religious building. The Church was entirely renovated around the end of the 19th century, acquiring neogothic features. In 1943, the architect Eusebio Petetti redesigned the facade.

Chiesa di Sant'Agostino

The former complex of Saint Augustine borders via Silvio Pellico and covers a remarkable portion of the old town. The first document, that certifies the presence of the Augustinians in Potenza Picena, dates back to 1250, when the church was entitled to Mary Magdalene. The interior of the church houses an altarpiece depicting “La Maddalena ai piedi della croce” (Magdalene at the foot of the cross) by Pietro Tedeschi, an ancient pipe chamber organ built in 1776 by master Giovanni Fedeli from Camerino and the precious panel painted by Bernardino di Mariotto in 1506 depicting “La Madonna con il Bambino tra i SS. Francesco, Antonio e Giovannino tra gli angeli musicanti” (The Madonna and Child among Saints Francis, Antonio and Infant John the Baptist among the Musician Angels). Today the church is deconsecrated and has become an auditorium, a cultural centre entitled to Ferdinando Scarfiotti, a production designer, Oscar winner in 1988 for “The Last Emperor” by Bertolucci.

Chiesa di Santa Caterina

The Saint Catherine monastery and church's origins are still uncertain. According to a general Benedictine catalogue, reported by the scholar Monsignor Cotognini, the two buildings had been built in 1280. The church houses a polyptych painted in 1507 by Paolo Bontulli from Percanestro depicting the “Madonna con bambino tra i Santi Giacomo Maggiore e Rocco” (The Madonna and Child among Saints James the Great and Roch). The church is deconsecrated since 2007. As seat of the municipal photo archive managed by the photo club and entitled to Bruno Grandinetti, a photographer from Potenza Picena, it houses the Kodak Museum with more than 340 vintage cameras. They date back from the early 20th century to the 70s, and they are all part of Enzo Romagnoli's collection, later given to the Municipality.

Chiesa di Santa Maria della Neve

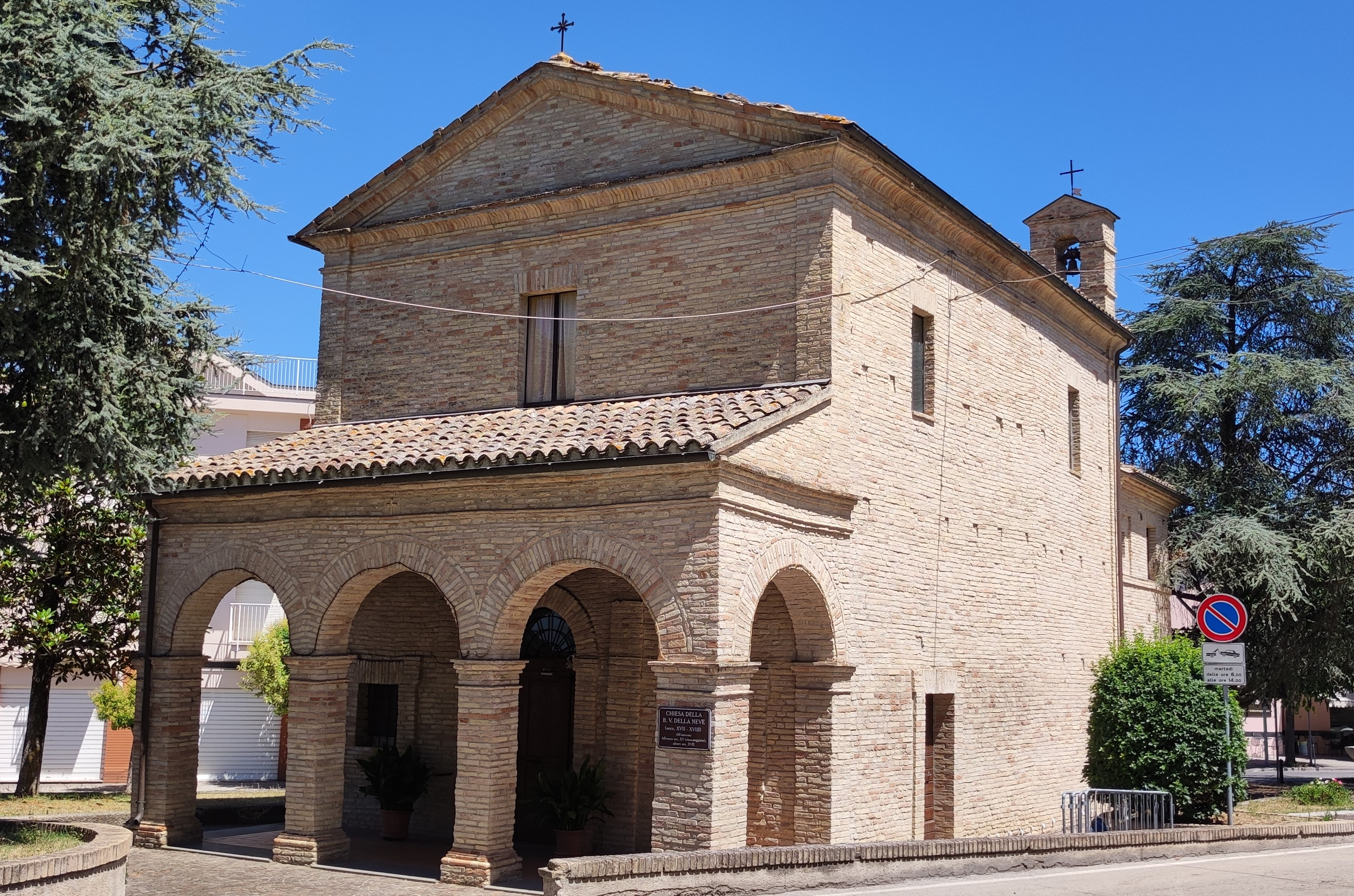
Chiesa della Beata Vergine della Neve

Around the ring of walls which divided the inhabited centre from the countryside, there were three churches, one nearby each of the village's gates, all dedicated to Saint Mary. Outside Marina Gate, there is the Church of Our Lady of the Snows. It had been dated to the 15th century, thanks to the fresco situated above the altar representing the “Madonna della Neve col Bambino e gli Angeli” (Our Lady of the Snows with Child and the Angels) by Pietro da Montepulciano, a painter from the Marche region. This church is linked to the pilgrimages since Potenza Picena was a transit location for those going to the Holy House in Loreto.

Chiesa dei Padri Cappuccini

During the second half of the 16th century, the municipal council tried to persuade the Capuchins to settle in the territory. The area of the current district Colle Bianco was offered them for the construction of the monastery. The church was built and entitled to Saint Lawrence martyr. After the Unification of Italy, the convent was abandoned until the end of the 19th century, when the friars took again possession of it. During the years, the church underwent restoration and renovation processes. In the interior, several important paintings are preserved such as “La Sacra Famiglia e San Giovannino” (Holy Family with the Infant Saint John the Baptist) from the 16th century by the painter Santi di Tito and “La Deposizione” (The Entombment of Christ) by Simone De Magistris.

Chiesa di San Tommaso

The Saint Thomas the Apostle monastery of Potenza Picena is one of the most ancient settlements of the second Franciscan Order. According to the tradition, the coenobium was founded by two sisters of the still alive Saint Clare, around 1227. While the monastery architecture is humble in order to respect the Franciscan rules, the church dedicated to Saint Thomas the Apostle shows baroque decorations with neoclassical altars and some painting of scuola romana (a 20th century art movement).

Collegio dei Gesuiti

Until 1773, the Jesuits College was annexed to the Collegiate church of Saint Stephen. Nowadays, the place is designated as an accommodation for the nuns of the congregation “Figlie del Santissimo Redentore e della Beata Vergine Addolorata” (Daughters of the Most Holy Redeemer and Our Lady of Sorrows). The young nuns joining this congregation were taught embroidery and weaving. At the beginning, they used small looms but, thanks to their skills, the religious people provided them with more efficient machinery – the Jacquard Looms. The fine cloths weaved by the nuns belonged to the local nobles and, some of them, can still be admired in a room also containing still functioning looms from the 19th century and the vertical warped loom designed by Leonardo Da Vinci.

Convento degli Zoccolanti

Even though the Zoccolanti (an order of Friars Minor wearing clog shoes, “zoccoli” in Italian) had previously attempted to settle in Potenza Picena, as some documents testify, the convent dates back to the late 5th century. In fact, in 1463, Pope Pius II sent two papal bulls to the municipality in order to promote the construction of a convent near the San Girio church. However, the friars preferred a location closer to the inhabited centre, maybe because of the insalubrity of the Potenza river's valley. The convent houses important pictorial works and a wide missionary museum. Vegetable gardens and a woodland can be appreciated next to the building.

Chiesa di San Francesco

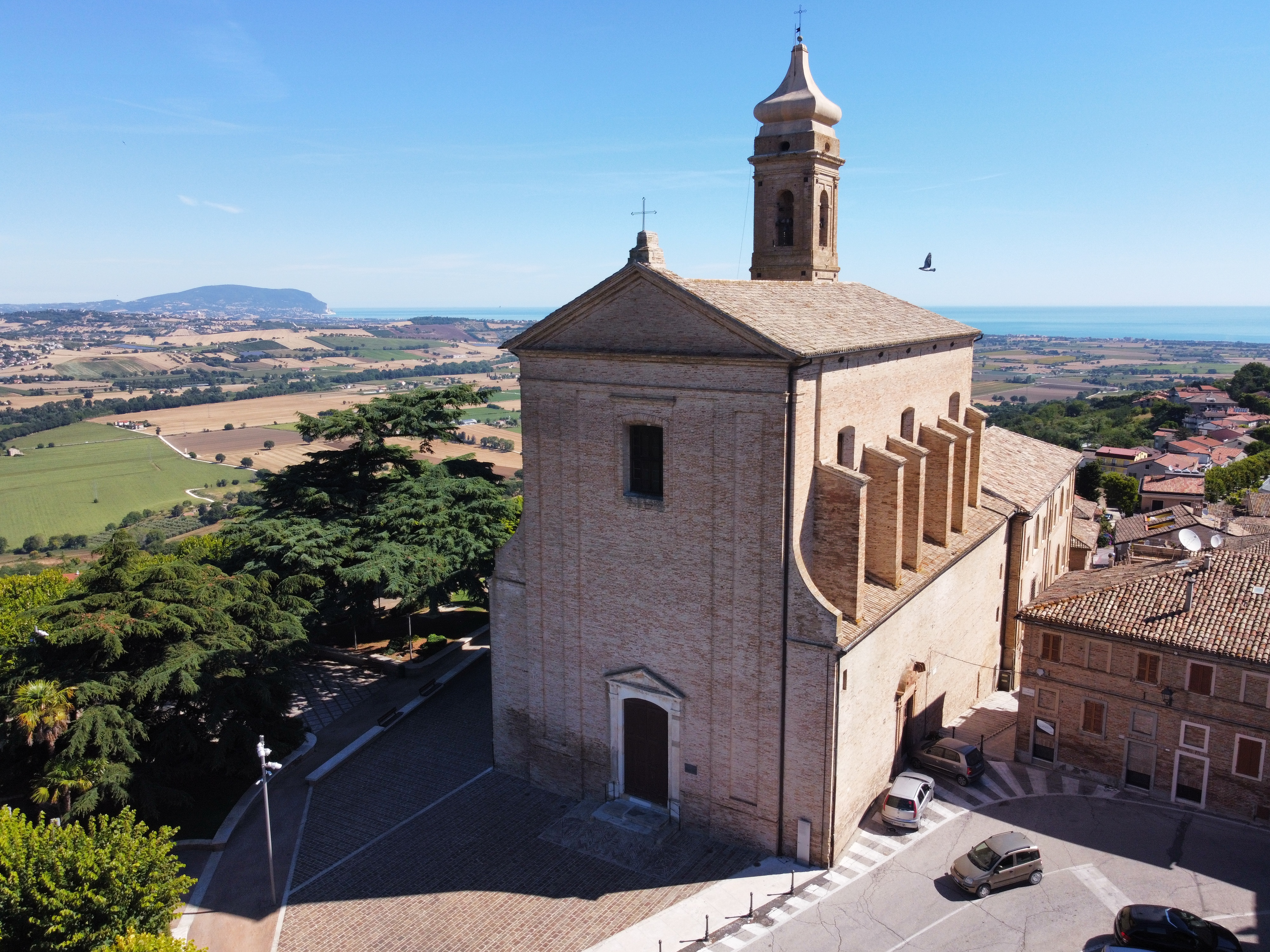
Chiesa di San Francesco

In the area of the Belvedere Donatori di Sangue (Panoramic Viewpoint of Blood Donors), normally known as Pincio, there is the church of Saint Nicolò, usually known the church of Saint Francis. According to the tradition, Francis of Assisi himself, founder of the monastery of Monte Santo around 1222-23, had arrived in the small town with a group of friars. In the interior of the church, there are statues of the four cardinal virtues as well as several paintings: “Miracolo di San Giuseppe da Copertino” (Miracle Saint Joseph of Cupertino), “La Natività” (The Nativity) and “La Vergine Immacolata tra Angeli e i Santi Nicolò, Francesco d’Assisi e altro santo francescano” (Our Lady of the Immaculate Conception among the Angels and the Saints Nicolò, Francis of Assisi and another Franciscan saint).

Santuario di San Girio

The Sanctuary of Saint Gerard of Lunel is one of the most beloved places of worship of the population. The church, originally built by the location of the saint's grave in 1298, was reconstructed in 1560, at the expense of the community of Monte Santo.

Chiesa di San Sisto

At the beginning, the church of Saint Sixtus was a private building belonging to the noble family Compagnoni Marefoschi. Then, it was purchased, together with the church, by the Benedictine nuns, becoming their monastery. Inside there is a wooden crucified Christ from 1500, object of worship and devotion. In addition, there are the statue of Saint Benedict of Nursia and Saint Scholastica (his sister) who is regarded as the foundress of the Benedictine nuns.

=== Civil architecture ===
Piazza Matteotti

It is the heart of Potenza Picena. In the Medieval times it was entitled to Saint Stephen (the first Christian martyr), then, after the Unification of Italy, to the prince of Naples. The square is surrounded by the town hall, the podestà palace, the belfry and theatre Bruno Mugellini.

The town hall

From 1745, it was rebuilt by the architect Pietro Bernasconi, the main assistant of Luigi Vanvitelli. In the following century, the building underwent more renovations and transformations. The council hall, entitled to the first mayor after the fascism, Antonio Carestia, houses three pieces of art: the canvas “Madonna con Bambino tra i Santi Martino e Rocco” (1584) (Mary with Child among Saints Martin and Roch) by Simone De Magistris, “Allegoria della Pace” (18th century) (Allegory of Peace) by Corrado Giaquinto and “Sant’Emidio” (1770) (Saint Emygdius) by Benedetto Biancolini.

The Palace of the Podestà

Dating back to the 14th century, it was restored in the 18th century, with the addition of the Ghibelline merlons, and in the 19th century. It housed the podestà offices, who mainly exercised the judicial function.

The belfry

The current square building, which ends with a small terrace, 34.50 metres high, is the result of the last restoration work. On 11 January 1886, lightning hit the octagonal pinnacle, which was 46.90 metres high, approximately 12.40 metres more than the current roof's height. The lightning damaged two of the four bells of the tower and the clock. To avoid further damage by climate factors, a lightning rod was installed. In 1943, the bells were removed and melted down for military purposes, so on 21 May 1951 some new ones were collocated in the original position. On 30 June 1944, a German cannon shot from the hill of Recanati hit the belfry, killed five people in the Potenza Picena square and destroyed the commemorative plaque of the fallen of the First World War. This plaque was renewed with the addition of the names of the fallen during the Second World War and those of the local partisans Mariano Cutini and Mariano Scipioni. In 1955, in occasion of the Potenza Picena proclamation as “Città di Maria” (City of Mary), a terracotta statue depicting Our Lady of the Assumption, made by the sculptor Giovanni (known as Nino) Patrizi from San Ginesio, was collocated on the belfry façade. In 1968, for the 50th anniversary from the end of the Great War, another memory plaque was embedded. Finally, on 25 April 2000, another commemorative plaque was collocated to honour the eight people who died on 30 June 1944 due to two German cannon shots.

The Bruno Mugellini theatre

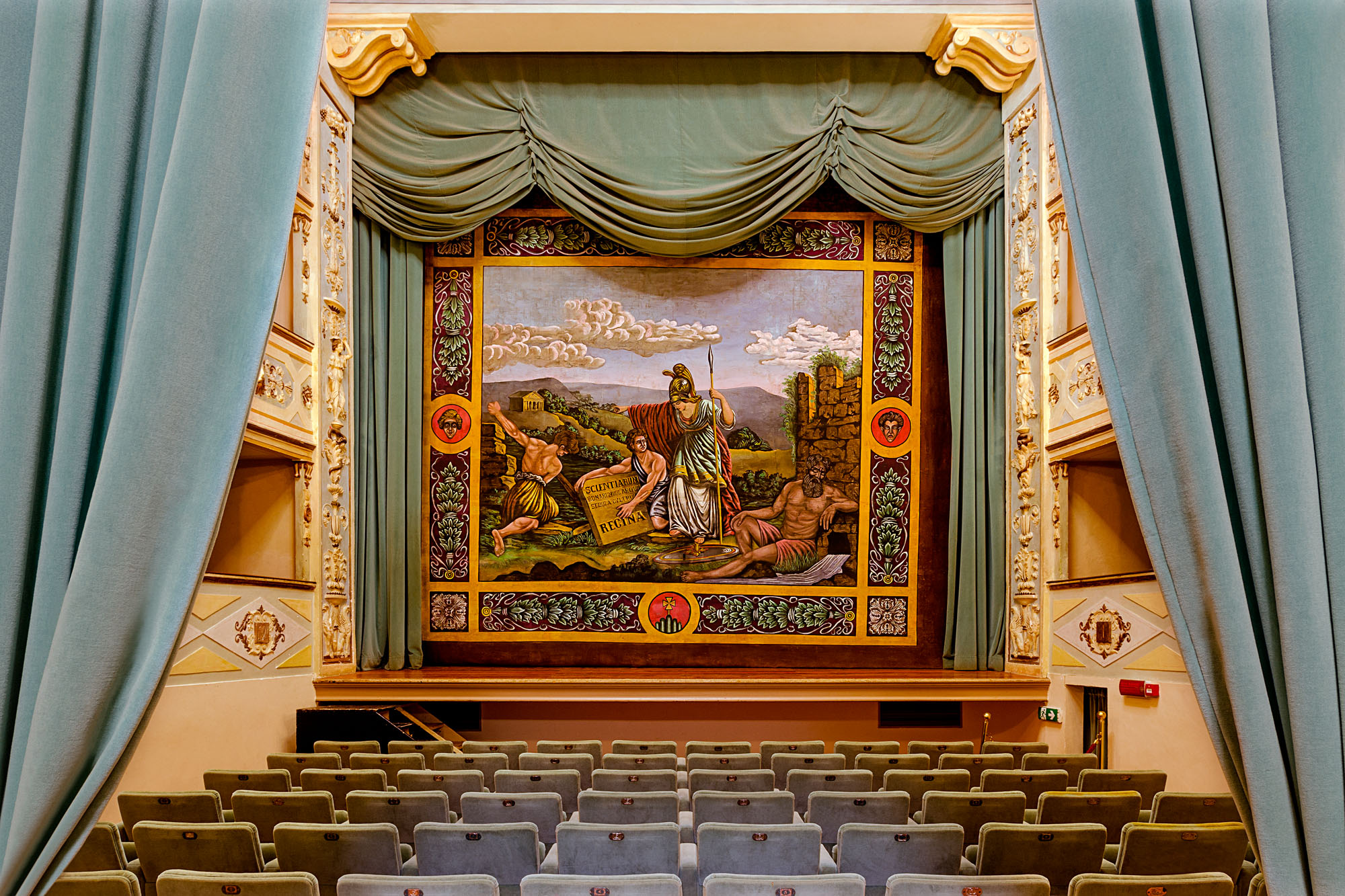
The Bruno Mugellini theatre

The construction, finished on 20 December 1859, was entrusted to the architect Brandoni. The painter Filippo Persiani concluded the decoration of the theatre after the Unification of Italy. To celebrate the event, in the centre of the ceiling, he painted the coronation of a woman, the personification of Italy. The building, with its capacity of 152 seats, was opened to the public in occasion of the 1862 Carnival. On 28 October 1933, the theatre was entitled to the well-known musician Bruno Mugellini from Potenza Picena. The theatre curtain, approximately 7 metres large and 5 metres high, depicts a mythological scene with the Greek goddess Minerva. Above the representation there is the coat of arms of the Royal Savoy Family, to honour the Unification of Italy, while on the bottom there is the Potenza Picena one.

Villa Buonaccorsi

It's an 18th century villa, country residence of the Buonaccorsi family, situated on the Potenza Picena hills, not much distant from the Porto Potenza Picena district. Even though it was originally designed in the 16th century, the structure was renovated halfway through the 18th century at the initiative of Pietro Bernasconi. The charm of the villa perfectly fits that of the garden, one of the most well-known in Italy and very appreciated also abroad. Dating back to the 17th century, the garden is divided in five terracings with five different styles linked together. The garden includes a fountain, water effects, greenhouses, an automaton statue theatre and a small church. During the summer, theatre and music shows, and private ceremonies are held in the villa.

The Potenza Picena gates

The old town was provided with four entrance gates. Originally, they were positioned backward from their initial location since the ring of walls was enlarged multiple times. They are:

• Porta di Galazzano o Galiziano

Situated in the south-west of the city, it is the only one remained still in good conditions. Its name is linked to a brook housing a homonymous spring, anciently used by the citizens to drink and wash. In the past, the gate was known as “Porta Macerata” since from there the road, leading to the administrative county seat, starts. There are traceable mentions of the gate in some documents dating back to 1365. It underwent several restorations, such as in 1775, when the façade was modernised with a neoclassical style. Finally, in 1960, the gate was radically detached from the city walls and renovated again.

• Porta Girola o Marina

It was built nearby the church of Madonna della Neve (Our Lady of the Snow) and mentioned in documents dating back to the 14th century. The gate benefits strategically from its location since the road from here conducts to the important port of Ancona. During the centuries the gate underwent several restorations until 1950, when it was demolished due to the increasing car traffic of the time, requiring a convenient and wider access to the city centre.

• Porta San Giovanni

Located near the church of Madonna delle Grazie (Our Lady of Graces), anciently it was the only way to reach the port of Porto Potenza Picena district. In 1956 it was demolished to simplify the access to the inhabited centre.

• Porta del Cunicolo o della Cava

It was positioned in the Sant’Angelo district. There were reports of it since 1365, however, nowadays even its ruins are forgotten by the population.

=== Belvedere Donatori di Sangue ===
The Panoramic Viewpoint of Blood Donors, also known as Pincio, is a panoramic terrace situated next to the church of Saint Francis, nearby via Trento. The name was assigned on 13 October 1996. It was previously called “Giardino dei Tigli” (Garden of Lindens) due to the 50 trees planting which form the alley, occurred in 1901. In addition to some inhabited centres like Montelupone, Recanati and Macerata, from Pincio it's possible to view the Sibillini Mountains, the Potenza river valley, the Basilica of Loreto, the Mount Conero and the coastline. In the centre of the garden there's a Lebanese cedar, one of the most ancient of the Marche region. Nearby there the Piramide de Mayo, a small-sized copy of the original situated in Buenos Aires. It was donated by the Sociedad Potentina de Mutuo Socorro of Buenos Aires, an important organisation of Potenza Picena emigrants to Argentina. It was positioned in the current location with celebrations on 16 July 1967.

=== Streets and alleys ===
In the old town, thanks to the initiative of the Garibaldian Dr Felice Schelini, a lot of streets are dedicated to the characters and the events of the glorious Risorgimento times. Amont the protagonists to remembers, there are undoubtedly the main avenue entitled to the Victor Emmanuel II, the Giuseppe Garibaldi square, the streets Luigi Mercantini, Carlo Zima, Luca Spano, Silvio Pellico, Edmondo de Amicis. Among the relevant events, San Martino, Solferino, Castelfidardo, Caprera, Marsala, Palestro, Balilla, and Masaniello must be mentioned. Other streets and alleys had been named for the most important families of Potenza Picena, such as the Buonaccorsi and the Marefoschi families. Others have been dedicated to partisans like Mariano Cutini and Mariano Scipioni or to famous people like Bruno Mugellini, Guglielmo Marconi, Enrico Fermi, Luigi Galvani, Lodovico Scarfiotti and Umberto I.

=== Natural areas ===
Parco dei Laghetti (the Small Lakes Park) is a natural oasis in the district of Porto Potenza Picena. The park, located in a retrieved former quarry, is situated in the north segment of the coast, and also includes a nearby floristic zone. Since 1997, when the Marche region recognised the park as a protected floristic area, it is a shelter for several animal species, especially the winged ones. The oasis covers a total of 64 hectares, half of which are all water. The lakes were created with a gravel excavation process, and they are characterised by steep shores and deep waters. Among its 158 birds species, the most renowned are the Anatidae (for their overwintering) and the coots, aquatic birds big as ducks, belonging to the Rallidae family (which have repeatedly built their nest in the oasis). The centre of Porto Potenza Picena is linked to the Parco dei Laghetti by a cycling-pedestrian route which costs the Potenza river and passes through five municipalities up to Macerata, offering the possibility to admire the archaeological sites of Potentia and Helvia Recina.

== Society ==
=== Demographic evolution ===
Historical population

Year	Pop.	±%
1861	6,605	—
1871	6,950	+5.2%
1881	7,390	+6.3%
1901	8,037	+8.8%
1911	7,982	−0.7%
1921	7,585	−5.0%
1931	8,002	+5.5%
1936	8,650	+8.1%

Year	Pop.	±%
1951	9,855	+13.9%
1961	10,724	+8.8%
1971	11,714	+9.2%
1981	12,752	+8.9%
1991	13,602	+6.7%
2001	14,524	+6.8%
2011	15,843	+9.1%
2021	15,515	−2.1%

Source: ISTAT

=== Ethnic groups and minorities ===
According to ISTAT data from 31 December 2022, the foreign population counted 1,333 people. The most represented nationalities were:

1. Romania, 204
2. North Macedonia, 190
3. Pakistan, 178
4. Albania, 119
5. Morocco, 72
6. China, 71
7. Senegal, 68
8. Poland, 45
9. Ukraine, 44
10. Tunisia, 39

=== Hospitals ===
Istituto Santo Stefano

The history of the Saint Stephen rehabilitation Institute begins in the 1920s, when the Perugian Count Gian Carlo Conestabile della Staffa erected a building that housed for free widows and orphans from the World War at the beginning, and later children from Perugia and Assisi predisposed to tuberculosis. The complex was initially named “Divina Provvidenza” (Divine Providence), but it was familiarly known as “Santo Stefano” (Saint Stephen) because it was located near a chapel named after the protomartyr. Today, the Institute specialises in the rehabilitation of severe acquired brain injury and myelopathy, neurological, orthopedic and pulmonary rehabilitation, and care for patients in a persistent vegetative state and with severe disabilities. The local population owes a great deal to the Institute both occupationally and socially. To date, the Institute is regarded as one of the largest in the health care scene, both nationally and internationally.

=== Organisations and institutes ===
Air Force

The decision of the Air Force Major Command to build a Radar Center in the territory of Potenza Picena dates back to April 1956.The task of the military staff working in the radar is to provide information to the pilots of interceptor aircraft, controlling the airspace, sighting, intercepting, identifying and guiding fighters, in order to prevent violations of the airspace itself. The facility is also equipped with living quarters, computer labs, multimedia lab, a video-conferencing system, a canteen, and many other facilities for advanced training courses for non-commissioned officer, I.G.P. courses for major sergeants, and for volunteer troops in the various fields of employment of the Armed Force.

=== Traditions and folklore ===
Il Grappolo d'Oro

The “Grappolo d’Oro” (Bunch of Golden Grapes), commonly known as “Festa dell’uva” (grape festival), is an event to celebrate the wine-making tradition and the culture of the Potenza Picena's community. From over 60 years, this folkloristic occurrence cheers up the village with taverns, inns, artisan markets and exhibitions, but also live music and street shows in the old town. The main attraction of the festival is undoubtedly the allegoric float parade – each float representing a district of the town, and its actors performing a 20-minute comedy show in Piazza Matteotti. According to the tradition, an official declaration by a messenger of the wine god Bacchus, riding a horse, announces the beginning of Grappolo d’Oro to the citizens. The first edition of 1955 was entitled “Festa dell’Uva” (The Grapes Festival) and was characterised by the enthusiasm of those who organised it and took part in it. The first editions consisted simply in rural carts dragged by oxen, representing grape harvest, wine cellars and winemaking. Over the years, the event acquired more modern and innovative connotations, without losing its original appeal. In addition, Potenza Picena welcomes the delegations of the twin towns Templemore, Burford and Premilhat, who have always enjoyed the exciting folkloristic vibes.

Il presepe vivente

The living nativity scene of Potenza Picena is carried out in the woods surrounding the Friars Minor convent. About two hundred actors and characters animate the numerous scenes set up on the 200 m2 covered by the event.

La festa di Sant'Anna

Every 26 July, the hamlet of Porto Potenza Picena celebrates the Feast of Saint Anne. The beginning of the famous celebration is ritually announced by the ringing of the bells of the Saint Anne's tower in the early morning. Historically, a canvas depicting the image of Saint Anne was carried in procession through the streets of the coastal village by four worshippers, followed by the golden canopy supported by six other worshippers. Moments of a strong religious nature were alternated with playful initiatives involving the townspeople, such as a duck-catching contest, a raffle, and a concert by the Potenza Picena Band. In modern times, many of these activities have been replaced by markets and stalls, but especially by the great fireworks display over the sea that attracts thousands of people every year.

La festa di San Girio

The feast of Saint Gerard is a religious but also popular event that takes place on the 25th of May in the homonymous district. From a religious point of view, the patron saint is celebrated with a holy mass, a procession, and the traditional tribute of candles.

Lo Porto de cent'anni fa

"Lo Porto de cent'anni fa'” (the port of a hundred years ago, in dialect) is a cultural event that has been gaining a renowned tradition in the recent years, and it is attracting more and more visitors edition after edition. About 200 actors in vintage costumes (between 1900 and 1920) bring to life different scenarios categorised by social classes. It will be possible to observe nobles in their elegance, peasants carrying out their daily chores, and fishermen in their typical attire.

La festa di San Vincenzo Ferreri

The feast of Saint Vincent Ferrer is held in the hamlet of Montecanepino on Easter Monday. For this traditional occasion, numerous visitors come to Montecanepino to attend the morning Mass.

== Culture ==
The photo library

The inauguration of the municipal photo library "Bruno Grandinetti" took place 6 July 2007. It's housed in the former Church of Santa Caterina d'Alessandria (Saint Catherine of Alexandria) in Corso Vittorio Emanuele (Victor Emmanuel Avenue). The creation of the new cultural institution was possible thanks to the donation of Bruno Grandinetti's immense photographic fund, made by the photographer's wife. The collection represents a documentation of inestimable value, an inexhaustible source of characters, stories and traditions told through images, thanks to great sensitivity and unparalleled technical quality. The photographer Bruno Grandinetti has been a faithful and precious witness to the history of Potenza from 1950 onwards: he has been able to tell the story of his land and its people by capturing the folkloristic moments of daily life, he has immortalised its traditions, he has highlighted the critical issues and beauties of Potenza Picena. The collection consists of 15,000 prints (in black-and-white and colour), over 50,000 negatives and around 20,000 slides. Furthermore, the municipal photo library is home to the Potenza Picena Fotoclub and hosts the exhibition of Kodak cameras. The set of these devices (over 300) forms the so-called "Kodak Museum", which is the result of the work and passion of a citizen of Potenza, Enzo Romagnoli, who donated his private collection of vintage cameras dating back from the late 19th century to the 1980s.

The library

The municipal library of Potenza Picena, located in via Trento, preserves approximately 21,000 volumes and is divided into two sections: the modern section and the ancient section. The modern section contains a large amount of documents of both local and Marche's history and culture. This section includes materials relating to the sectors of narrative, poetry and literary criticism, but also pedagogical texts related to the world of childhood and adolescence, intended for parents and educators. Furthermore, in the modern section there are around 90 periodicals of every genre and publication frequency (monthly, weekly, daily, etc.), and a musical sector named after the "Diegi-Beltrami" donors, which contains the scores of 96 classical works. The ancient section contains around 1600 works: books from the 15th, 17th and 18th centuries, an incunabulum (lacking the first few sheets), and 42 book manuscripts. The Potenza Picena library also promotes initiatives and workshops aimed at promoting reading among children and adolescents.

Auditorium

The Ferdinando Scarfiotti auditorium, inaugurated in 2004 and located in the former Church of Saint Augustine, is named after the theatre and cinema set designer born in Potenza Picena. This place hosts conferences, city councils, public initiatives, but also exhibitions, concerts and even civil weddings. Inside the auditorium there is the precious hall organ known as the "Organo Fedeli". The organ, built in 1757 by Giovanni Fedeli and commissioned by the well-known artistic-musical patrons Compagnoni -Marefoschi, is a source of pride for the city of Potenza Picena and for its entire community.

The historic archive

The municipal historical archive, adjacent to the library, contains documents dating back to a not at all indifferent period ranging from the 13th to the 20th century. The archive is divided into four parts: the first, which in turn is divided into a private archive and a general archive, is related to the period of the "Ancien Régime" (from the Middle Ages to 1808), the second part contains the documents of the Napoleonic period (1808-1815), the third goes from the end of the Napoleonic age in Italy to the unification of Italy (1816-1860), and the fourth one concerns the period following the unification of Italy. Among all those precious elements, the cadastral register from 1369–70, which represents the oldest paper document in the entire archive, must be remembered. Other important documents are the municipal statutes of the 16th century, the manuscript copy of the statutes confirmed and approved by Pope Eugene IV, and finally the so-called "Reformationes", in other words a volume of decrees and laws taken from the Books of Councils (approximately from the 16th century).

Schola Cantorum Santo Stefano

The Schola Cantorum was formed in 1796 at the behest of the provost of Saint Stephen's Collegiate Church, who had the intuition to juxtapose a choir with the organ that the parish order already had. The first appearance of the Schola Cantorum dates back to the celebration of Holy Mass on Easter Day, on 27 March 1796. Over the years, the choir has performed in various towns in the Marche region, as well as in foreign cities such as Berlin, Zakynthos and Budapest. On 10 September 1995, the choir had the honor of singing in Montorso di Loreto at the Holy Mass celebrated by His Holiness John Paul II as part of the meeting with the youth of Europe.

The Saint Anne choir

The Saint Anne choir was founded in 1985 in Porto Potenza Picena on the initiative of some music lovers. The choir's repertoire ranges from classical Renaissance polyphony to contemporary music. The talent of the Saint Anne choir is nationally recognised, at such stage that over the years it has performed in many outstanding religious venues: Shrine of the Virgin of the Rosary in Pompei, Shrine of Saint Gabriel, and in the Shrine of Saint Rita of Cascia.

== Economy ==
=== Tourism ===
Potenza Picena is a fascinating tourism destination which offers various attractions and activities the visitors. A highlight in Potenza Picena is certainly its historical centre which, with its picturesque alleys, lively squares and ancient sites, such as the Belvedere Donatori di Sangue or the Bruno Mugellini Theatre, encompasses a wealth of traditions and folklore that will never fade. In addition, Potenza Picena hosts various cultural events throughout the year, including music festivals such as the debuting 'Rock n Roll Bonsai' or the already consolidated 'Mugellini Festival', as well as gastronomic festivals and folklore events such as the 'Grappolo d'Oro' and the 'Festa di Sant'Anna'. The city of Potenza Picena is in fact renowned for its traditional cuisine and wines: tourists can enjoy local specialities in restaurants or take part in wine tastings at the city's numerous wine cellars. During the summer months, tourism plays a significant role in the local economy due to the Adriatic coast location and the presence of numerous beaches. Thus, the tourism sector contributes to job creation and economic growth through hospitality, catering services and recreational activities.

=== Agriculture ===
The agricultural sector is important for the local economy because it contributes to strengthen the renowned wine and food culture of the area and the entire region. The municipality of Potenza Picena is home to several outstanding wineries, such as Santa Cassella, the first company to introduce Chardonnay in the Marche region, the Monte Santo winery and the Andrea Giorgetti winery.

=== Industry ===
The manufacturing landscape is varied and well distributed throughout the territory. Among the activities to be mentioned are those related to the production and processing of components for the footwear industry, construction, carpentry, plastics processing, hardware and software design. Agricultural and food companies are also active in the area, as well as numerous activities in the catering and hospitality industry. Among the all of the companies in Potenza Picena, here are some examples: NSC operating in the oil sector, Elettromedia active in the car audio market and Goldenplast leader in the production of thermoplastic compounds.

== Infrastructures and transport ==
=== Roads ===
Near Potenza Picena passes the Helvia Recina state road 571 (SS571), which connects the area near Macerata with the coastal area. The route SS571 begins in the municipality of Recanati, more precisely in the locality of Fontenoce. The road then follows the course of the Potenza river, passing not far from Potenza Picena, and then ends in the municipality of Porto Recanati, joining the State Road 16 Adriatica near Lido Santa Maria in Potenza. The state road SS16 Adriatica (SS16), the longest state road in the Italian network with more than 1,000 km, also crosses the municipality of Potenza Picena in the district of Porto Potenza Picena.

=== Railways ===
In Porto Potenza Picena, there is the Potenza Picena-Montelupone station, a railway stop on the Adriatic railway serving the towns of Potenza Picena and Montelupone.

== People related to Potenza Picena ==
- Renzo Tortelli, photographer.
- Giordano Macellari, painter.
- Ludovico Scarfiotti, Formula One and sports car driver.
- Ferdinando Scarfiotti, art director.

== Twin towns ==
The municipality of Potenza Picena has been twinned with the British town of Burford since 30 September 2001, and with the Irish town of Templemore since 17 March 2004. The purpose of twinning is to foster contacts and exchanges between citizenships in order to increase human and cultural relations, and to strengthen a mutual heritage of knowledge.

Twin towns include:

- (Republic of Ireland) Templemore (Ireland)
- Burford (United Kingdom)

== Sport ==
=== Football ===
ASD Futsal Potenza Picena

The history of the club began in the summer of 2013 when some managers, after other types of experiences, decided to independently found the ASD FUTSAL POTENZA PICENA. The team played its first championship in Serie D, while in the following seasons it played regularly between Serie C1 and C2. During the 2021-2022 season, Futsal Potenza Picena faced its second Serie B championship, finishing the season in the 5th place and snatching the playoff pass for the first time in its history. From here, the great dream began, with the team able to win the play-offs of their group, then stopping at the quarterfinals of the national scoreboard. A thrilling season, full of challenges and satisfactions. The apotheosis arrived in the 2022-2023 season with the first historic conquest of the A2 championship.

ASD Potenza Picena Calcio

ASD Potenza Picena Calcio was founded in 1945. The first shirt was yellow and red striped, with a white star. Its first president was Pierino Pierandrei, after him there were nineteen other presidents, up to the current Andrea Savoretti. The Potenza Picena outdoor sport centre was built (on land made available by the Favale- Scarfiotti family) by Polish soldiers of the 4th Skorpion Regiment and inaugurated on 10 June 1946. The team currently plays in the B group of Marche region's Promotion League.

Union Picena Calcio

A new sports reality was born in Potenza Picena in 2019 under the name of ASD Union Picena Calcio. Union Picena has achieved recent successes in the youth sector, such as being recognised as an Elite Football School. The first team currently plays in the third category and plays its home matches at the Ferruccio Orselli field.

=== Volleyball ===
Volley Potentino

The men's volleyball club Volley Potentino was founded in 1979 by a group of friends. Over the years, the club grew and reached a national level championship in 1998 when the team reached Serie B2. The promotion to Serie B1 arrived at the end of the 2003-2004 season, while at the end of the 2011-2012 season the club won the promotion to Serie A2. After finishing the 2014-2015 season in third place, as well as the final in the Italian Cup of Serie A2, it gained access to the promotion play-offs, which it won, beating Corigliano Volley in the final series, being promoted to Serie A1. However, the club refused to participate in the top Italian championship, remaining in Serie A2.

Volley Torresi

Volley Torresi is a women's volleyball club that arose from the detachment of Volley Potentino in 2002. Volley Torresi has known years of splendour, playing in Serie B2 and B1 for several seasons.

=== Cycling ===
Cycling has a long tradition in the municipality, beginning in 1945, when the Gruppo Ciclistico Sant'Antonio, later to become Gruppo Sportivo Potentia, was founded. The Gruppo Sportivo Potentia counts several champions at both regional and national levels. Some names to remember are Marina Romoli, Alessia Massaccesi, Tonino Ciarrocca and Mario and Massimo Mancini.
