= Morrovalle =

- Comune
- Comune di Morrovalle
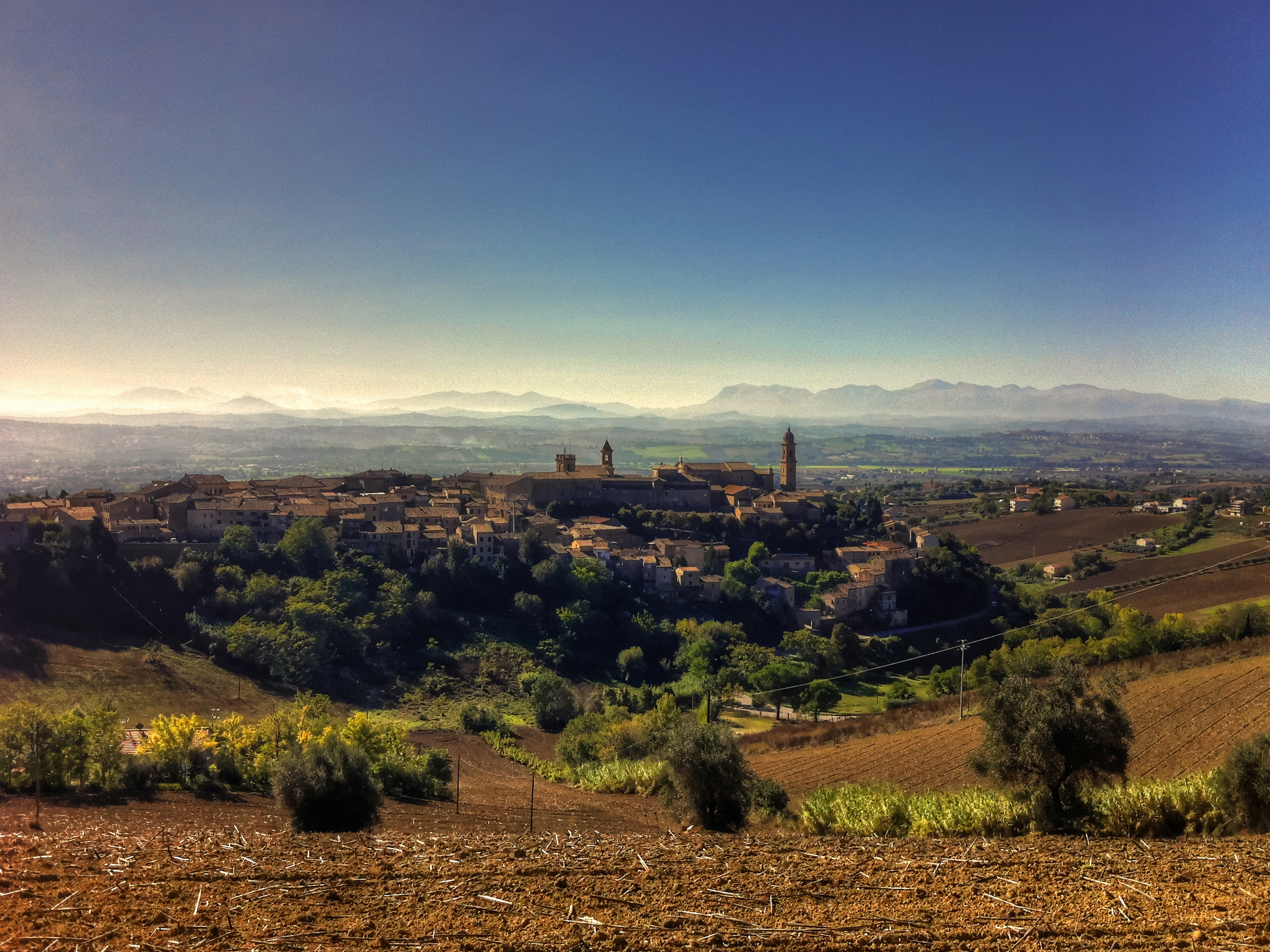
- A view of historical center of Morrovalle from "colli bella vista" (Nice view hills)

- Location within Italy Location within Marche
- Coordinates: 43°19′N 13°35′E
- Country: Italy
- Region: Marche
- Province: Macerata (MC)
- Frazioni: Borgo Pintura, Morrovalle Scalo, Padri Passionisti, Cunicchio, Santa Lucia, Trodica, Mulinetto

Government
  - Mayor: Stefano Montemarani

Area
  - Total: 42.58 km^{2} (16.44 sq mi)
- Elevation: 246 m (807 ft)

Population (30 November 2017)
  - Total: 10,069
  - Density: 236.5/km^{2} (612.5/sq mi)
- Demonym: Morrovallesi
- Time zone: UTC+1 (CET)
  - Summer (DST): UTC+2 (CEST)
- Postal code: 62010
- Dialing code: 0733
- Patron saint: St. Bartholomew the Apostle
- Saint day: August 24
- Website: Official website

Morrovalle is a comune (municipality) in the Province of Macerata in the Italian region Marche, located about 35 kilometres (22 mi) south of Ancona and about 11 kilometres (7 mi) east of Macerata.

Morrovalle borders the following municipalities: Corridonia, Macerata, Monte San Giusto, Montecosaro, Montegranaro, Montelupone.

== Main sights ==
- Church of Sant'Agostino
- Church of San Bartolomeo
- Sanctuary of Madonna dell'Acqua Santa
