= Montelupone =

- Comune
- Comune di Montelupone
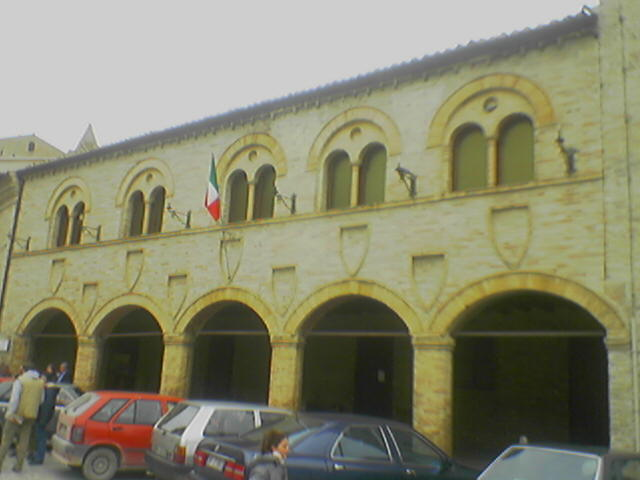
- Palazzo dei Priori.

- Coat of arms

- Location within Italy Location within Marche
- Coordinates: 43°21′N 13°34′E
- Country: Italy
- Region: Marche
- Province: Macerata (MC)
- Frazioni: San Firmano

Government
  - Mayor: Rolando Pecora

Area
  - Total: 32.67 km^{2} (12.61 sq mi)
- Elevation: 272 m (892 ft)

Population (30 November 2017)
  - Total: 3,590
  - Density: 110/km^{2} (285/sq mi)
- Demonym: Monteluponesi
- Time zone: UTC+1 (CET)
  - Summer (DST): UTC+2 (CEST)
- Postal code: 62010
- Dialing code: 0733
- Patron saint: St. Firmanus
- Website: Official website

Montelupone is a comune (municipality) in the Province of Macerata in the Italian region Marche, located about 30 kilometres (19 mi) south of Ancona and about 11 kilometres (7 mi) northeast of Macerata.

Montelupone borders the following municipalities: Macerata, Montecosaro, Morrovalle, Potenza Picena, Recanati. It is one of I Borghi più belli d'Italia ("The most beautiful villages of Italy").

== Main sights ==
- San Firmano Abbey, a Romanesque monastery, founded in the late 9th century AD. The sacristy houses a terracotta by Ambrogio della Robbia.
- Medieval gates
- Palazzo del Podestà and Civic Tower
- Civic Gallery
- Church of Santa Chiara
- Collegiate church
- Church of San Francesco
- Church of Pietà (15th century)
