= Porto Recanati =

- Comune
- Città di Porto Recanati
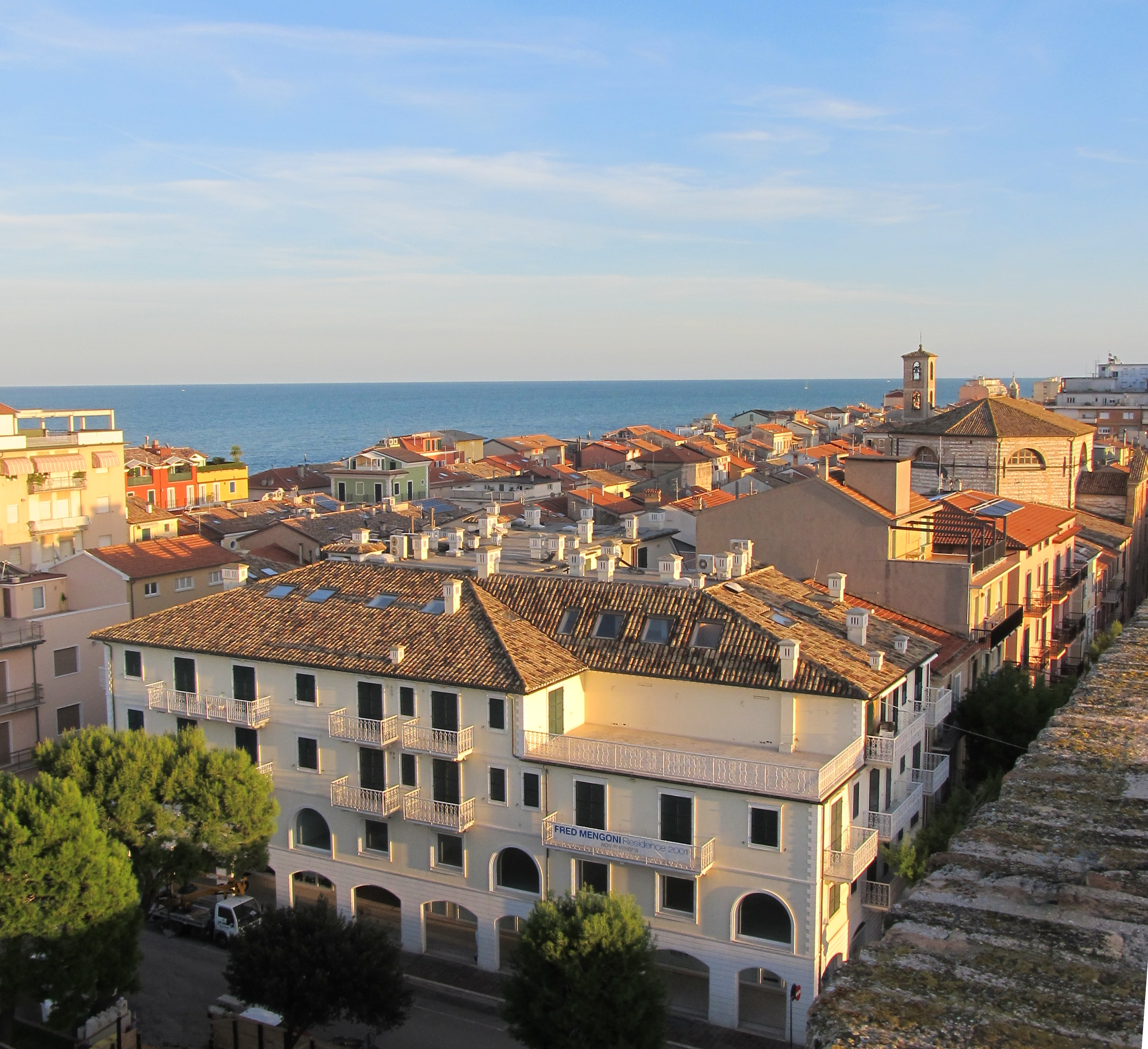
- Skyline from castle tower

- Location within Italy Location within Marche
- Coordinates: 43°25′56″N 13°39′53″E
- Country: Italy
- Region: Marche
- Province: Macerata (MC)
- Frazioni: Santa Maria in Potenza, Montarice, Scossicci

Government
  - Mayor: Andrea Michelini

Area
  - Total: 17 km^{2} (6.6 sq mi)
- Elevation: 5 m (16 ft)

Population (31 December 2017)
  - Total: 12,609
  - Density: 740/km^{2} (1,900/sq mi)
- Demonym: Portorecanatesi
- Time zone: UTC+1 (CET)
  - Summer (DST): UTC+2 (CEST)
- Postal code: 62017
- Dialing code: 071
- Patron saint: St. John the Baptist
- Saint day: August 29
- Website: Official website

Porto Recanati (pronounced [ˈpɔrto rekaˈnaːti]) is a town in the province of Macerata in the Marche region of Central Italy. It was made an independent town on 15 January 1893, due to a decree issued by King Umberto I causing the coastal hamlets of the town to be separated from Recanati.

With a population of approximately 12,500 inhabitants, Porto Recanati is located near Mount Conero. The town's seaboard extends for about 2 km (1.2 mi) from the mouth of the Musone River to beyond the Potenza River. The central part of the town is formed by gravel beaches and steep, deep-bottom seas, unlike nearby towns Potenza Picena and Civitanova Marche.

== History ==
The area seem to have been inhabited since Bronze Age, as findings on the top of Montarice's hill, hailing from period called Apennine Medium Bronze and dating from the 15th-14th centuries BC have confirmed. In the same areas fragments of the 6th century BC Attic pottery have been recovered, witnessing the early commercial trade in the area.

== Main sights ==
The Castello Svevo (Hohenstaufen Castle), built during the 13th through 15th centuries as a rampart against Turkish pirates attacks, is home to the Municipal Art Gallery, that in nine rooms collects paintings, mainly from 1850 to the early 20th century.

Among its churches is the parish church of San Giovanni Battista, and the small chapel of Chiesetta della Banderuola.

== Tourism ==
Porto Recanati is home to a large number of family-run restaurants and shops that cater to the tourism industry. Porto Recanati serves a spring-summer tourist town, with a beach and an annual Aeronautica Militare airshow.

Porto Recanati's restaurants offer a large selection of locally caught seafood including lobster, sea bass and calamari. A local specialty is the brodetto di Porto Recanati, a traditional fisherman's dish. The town also features a large fish market located on the outskirts of town.

== Twin towns ==
- Kronberg im Taunus, Germany
- Mar del Plata, Argentina
