= St. Mary Magdalene's Church =

St. Mary Magdalene's Church may refer to:

== Australia ==
- St Mary Magdalene's Church, Adelaide

== Canada ==
- St. Mary Magdalene Anglican Church, Mayne Island, British Columbia
- Church of St. Mary Magdalene (Toronto), Ontario

== Czech Republic ==
- St. Mary Magdalene Church, Karlovy Vary

== Estonia ==
- Saint Magdalene Church, Ruhnu, in Ruhnu Island, Estonia

== France ==
- Sainte-Madeleine, Strasbourg
- La Madeleine, Paris
- Church of St. Mary Magdalene, Rennes-le-Château
- Abbey of la Madaleine, Vézelay
- Basilica of St. Mary Magdalene, Saint-Maximin-la-Sainte-Baume

== Israel ==
- Church of Mary Magdalene, Mount of Olives, Jerusalem

== Italy ==
- Santa Maria Maddalena (disambiguation)

== Latvia ==
- St. Mary Magdalene's Church, Riga

== Lebanon ==
- Saint Mary Magdalene Church, North Lebanon

== Malta ==
- St Mary Magdalene Chapel, Dingli
- St. Mary Magdalene Chapel, Madliena
- Church of St Mary Magdalene, Valletta

== Philippines ==
- St. Mary Magdalene Church (Kawit), Cavite
- Saint Mary Magdalene Parish Church (Pililla, Rizal)
- Santa Maria Magdalena Parish Church, Magdalena, Laguna

== Poland ==
- Church of St. Mary Magdalene, Tarnobrzeg
- St Mary Magdalene Church, Wrocław
- Church of St. Mary Magdalene, Wyszogród

== Spain ==
- Santa María Magdalena, Córdoba
- Iglesia de la Magdalena, Toledo
- Church of St Mary Magdalene, Tudela

== Sweden ==
- Maria Magdalena Church, Stockholm

== Ukraine ==
- Church of St. Mary Magdalene, Lviv
- Church of Mary Magdalene, Mariupol

== United Kingdom ==
=== Bedfordshire ===
- Church of St Mary Magdalene, Melchbourne

=== Bristol ===
- St Mary Magdalene, Stoke Bishop

=== Buckinghamshire ===
- Church of St Mary Magdalene, Willen
- St Mary Magdalene's Church, Boveney

=== Cambridgeshire ===
- St Mary Magdalene Church, Ickleton

=== Cheshire ===
- St Mary Magdalene's Church, Alsager

=== Cornwall ===
- St Mary Magdalene's Church, Launceston

=== Cumbria ===
- St Mary Magdalene's Church, Broughton-in-Furness
- St Mary Magdalene's Church, Gilsland

=== Devon ===
- Mary Magdalene, Chulmleigh

=== Durham ===
- St Mary Magdalene Church, Hart

=== East Sussex ===
- St Mary Magdalene's Church, Bexhill-on-Sea
- St Mary Magdalen's Church, Brighton
- St Mary Magdalene's Church, St Leonards-on-Sea

=== Gloucestershire ===
- St Mary Magdalene Church, Elmstone Hardwicke

=== Hampshire ===
- Parish Church of St Mary Magdalene, New Milton

=== Herefordshire ===
- Church of St Mary Magdalene, Stretton Sugwas

=== Hertfordshire ===
- St Mary Magdalene's Church, Caldecote
- Parish Church of St Mary Magdalene, Great Offley

=== Kent ===
- Priory of St. Mary Magdalene, or Tonbridge Priory, Tonbridge

=== Lancashire ===
- St Mary Magdalene's Church, Clitheroe

=== Leicestershire ===
- St Mary Magdalene's Church, Stapleford

=== Lincolnshire ===
- St Mary Magdalene, Bailgate, Lincoln
- St Mary Magdalene's Church, Old Somerby

=== London ===
- St Mary Magdalen Bermondsey
- St Mary Magdalene Church, Camden, near Munster Square
- St Mary Magdalene's Church, East Ham
- St Mary Magdalene, Enfield
- St Mary Magdalene Church, Holloway Road
- St Mary Magdalen, Milk Street
- St Mary Magdalen Roman Catholic Church, Mortlake
- Church of St Mary Magdalene, North Ockendon
- St Mary Magdalene, Paddington
- St Mary Magdalene, Richmond
- St Mary Magdalene Woolwich

=== Norfolk ===
- St. Mary Magdalene Church, Sandringham

=== Nottinghamshire ===
- Church of St Mary Magdalene, Hucknall
- Church of St Mary Magdalene, Keyworth
- Church of St Mary Magdalene, Newark-on-Trent
- Church of St Mary Magdalene, Sutton-in-Ashfield

=== Oxfordshire ===
- St Mary Magdalen's Church, Oxford

=== Reigate ===
- Church of St Mary Magdalene, Reigate

=== Rutland ===
- Church of St Mary Magdalene, Essendine

=== Shropshire ===
- St Mary Magdalene's Church, Battlefield

=== Somerset ===
- Church of St Mary Magdalene, Barwick
- Church of St Mary Magdalene, Chewton Mendip
- Church of St Mary Magdalene, Clatworthy
- Church of St Mary Magdalene, Cricket Malherbie
- Church of St Mary Magdalene, Ditcheat
- Church of St Mary Magdalene, Great Elm
- Church of St Mary Magdalene, Sparkford
- Church of St Mary Magdalene, Stocklinch
- St Mary Magdalene, Taunton
- Church of St Mary Magdalene, Upton Noble
- Church of St Mary Magdalene, Winsford
- Church of St Mary Magdalene, Withiel Florey
- Church of St Mary Magdalene, Wookey Hole

=== Suffolk ===
- Mary Magdalen, Ipswich

=== Warwickshire ===
- Church of St Mary Magdalene, Tanworth-in-Arden

=== West Sussex ===
- St Mary Magdalene's Church, Bolney
- St. Mary Magdalene and St. Denis Church, Midhurst
- St Mary Magdalene's Church, Lyminster
- St Mary Magdalene's Church, Tortington

=== Wiltshire ===
- Church of St Mary Magdalene, Winterbourne Monkton

=== Worcestershire ===
- St Mary Magdalene's Church, Croome D'Abitot

=== Yorkshire ===
- St Mary Magdalene, Campsall
- St John and St Mary Magdalene Church, Goldthorpe
- St Mary Magdalene, Yarm
- Chapel of St Mary Magdalen, Ripon
- Church of St Mary Magdalene, Whitgift
- St Mary Magdalene's Church, Thormanby

== United States ==
- St. Mary Magdalen Church (Abbeville)
- St. Mary Magdalen Church (New York City)

== See also ==
- Santa Maria Madalena (disambiguation)
