= Cesi =

Cesi or CESI may refer to:

== Places ==
- Cesi, Serravalle di Chienti, a frazione (hamlet) in Marche, Italy
- Cesi, Terni, a frazione (hamlet) in Umbria, Italy

== Other uses ==
- Czechs, Czech people
- Cesi (surname)
- CESI (Education)
- European Confederation of Independent Trade Unions
- Centro Elettrotecnico Sperimentale Italiano
- Centre for Economic and Social Inclusion, a British think-tank

== See also ==
- CESIS, Italian security website
