= Fiuminata =

- Comune
- Comune di Fiuminata
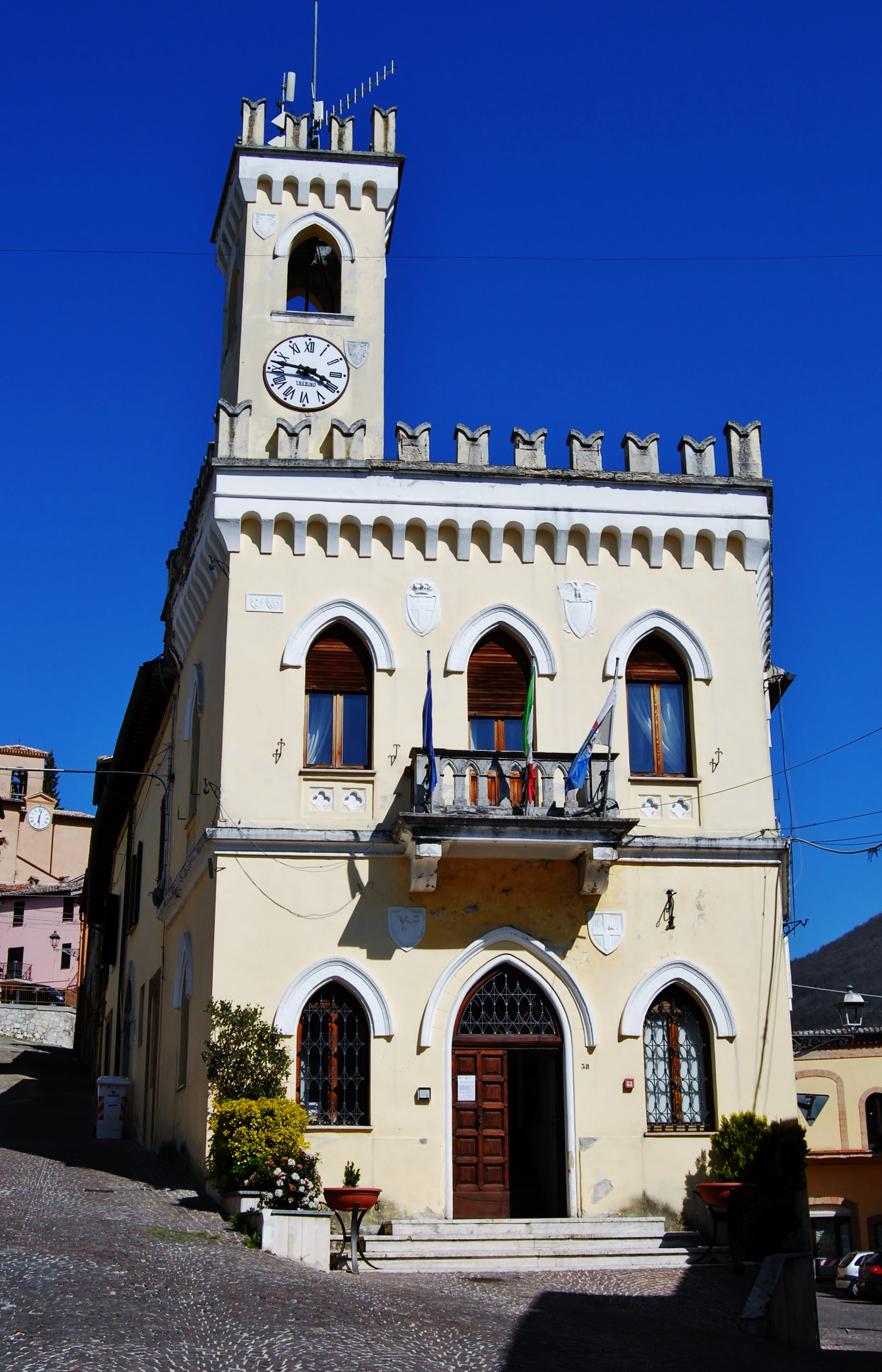
- Town hall

- Coat of arms

- Location within Italy Location within Marche
- Coordinates: 43°11′N 12°56′E
- Country: Italy
- Region: Marche
- Province: Macerata (MC)
- Frazioni: Bufeto, Bussi, Campottone, Capomassa, Casenove, Castello, Colmaggiore, Fonte di Brescia, La Castagna, Laverino, Massa (municipal seat), Orpiano, Poggio Sorifa, Pontile, Quadreggiana, San Cassiano, Spindoli, Valcora, Vallibbia

Government
  - Mayor: Vincenzo Felicioli

Area
  - Total: 76.7 km^{2} (29.6 sq mi)
- Elevation: 479 m (1,572 ft)

Population (28 February 2017)
  - Total: 1,368
  - Density: 17.8/km^{2} (46.2/sq mi)
- Demonym: Fiuminatesi
- Time zone: UTC+1 (CET)
  - Summer (DST): UTC+2 (CEST)
- Postal code: 62020
- Dialing code: 0737
- Website: Official website

Fiuminata is a comune (municipality) in the Province of Macerata in the Italian region Marche, located about 70 kilometres (43 mi) southwest of Ancona and about 45 kilometres (28 mi) southwest of Macerata. The municipal seat is in the frazione of Massa.

Fiuminata borders the following municipalities: Castelraimondo, Esanatoglia, Fabriano, Matelica, Nocera Umbra, Pioraco, Sefro, Serravalle di Chienti.

Among the churches in the town are:

- SS Carlo e Martino alla Forcatura di Caneggia
- San Paolo di Orpiano
- Santa Maria Assunta in Massa
- Santa Maria della Spina a Poggio
- Santa Maria di Laverino, Fiuminata
- San Giovanni Battista a Castello, Fiuminata
- Santuario della Beata Vergine di Valcora
