= Santa Maria Maddalena (disambiguation) =

Santa Maria Maddalena is a church in Rome.

Santa Maria Maddalena may also refer to:

== Churches in Italy ==
- Santa Maria Maddalena, Bologna, Emilia-Romagna
- Santa Maria Maddalena (Castiglione d'Orcia), Tuscany
- Santa Maria Maddalena, Cento, Emilia-Romagna
- Santa Maria Maddalena, Esanatoglia, Marche
- Santa Maria Maddalena, Gradoli, Latium
- Santa Maria Maddalena, Matelica, Marche
- Santa Maria Maddalena, Lodi, Lombardy
- Santa Maria Maddalena, Pievebovigliana, Marche
- Santa Maria Maddalena, Ravenna, Emilia-Romagna
- Santa Maria Maddalena, Urbania, Marche
- La Maddalena, Venice, Veneto

== See also ==
- Santa Maria Madalena (disambiguation)
- Mary Magdalene
- Santa María Magdalena de Pazzi
- Santa Maria Maddalena dei Pazzi
