= San Tossano, Sefro =

Church building in Sefro, Italy

Coordinates: 43°06′30″N 12°57′04″E

San Tossano is a Roman Catholic church located just outside the hamlet of Agolla in the town limits of Sefro, province of Macerata, region of Marche, Italy. Another church dedicated to this saint is located in Esanatoglia.

== History ==
A church of this name in the hamlet of Agolla seems to date from at least the year 1300, although the present building appears to date from the 15th century. During a pastoral visit in 1582, the Bishop of Camerino noted the church was in use. In 1802, one account states this was mainly used as a burial church. The layout is very simple: a rectangle with a gabled roof and a bell in the facade. The façade has an off-center round window. Once the walls were covered with frescoes. While most are poorly conserved, they date from the 13th to 16th centuries.

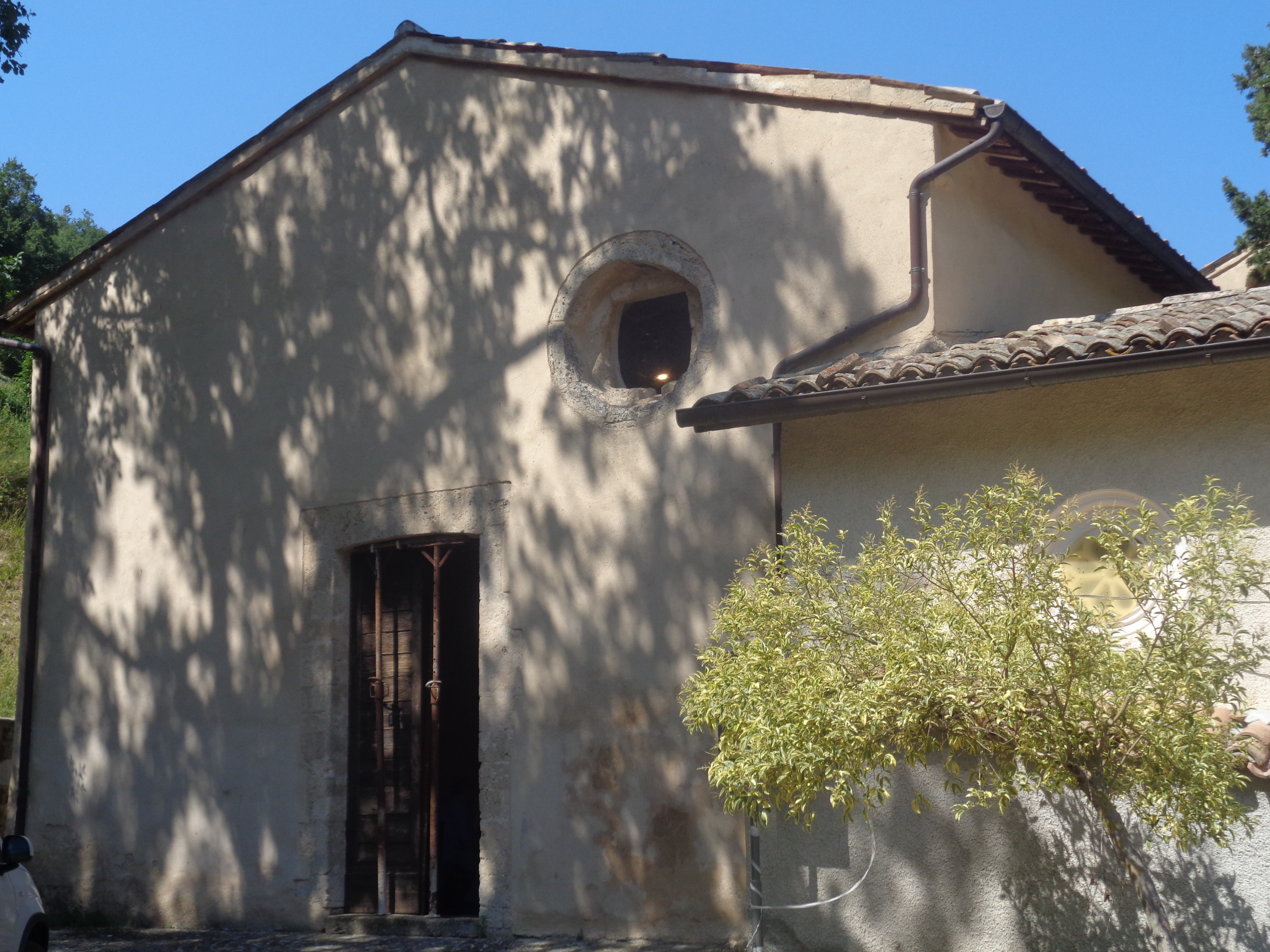

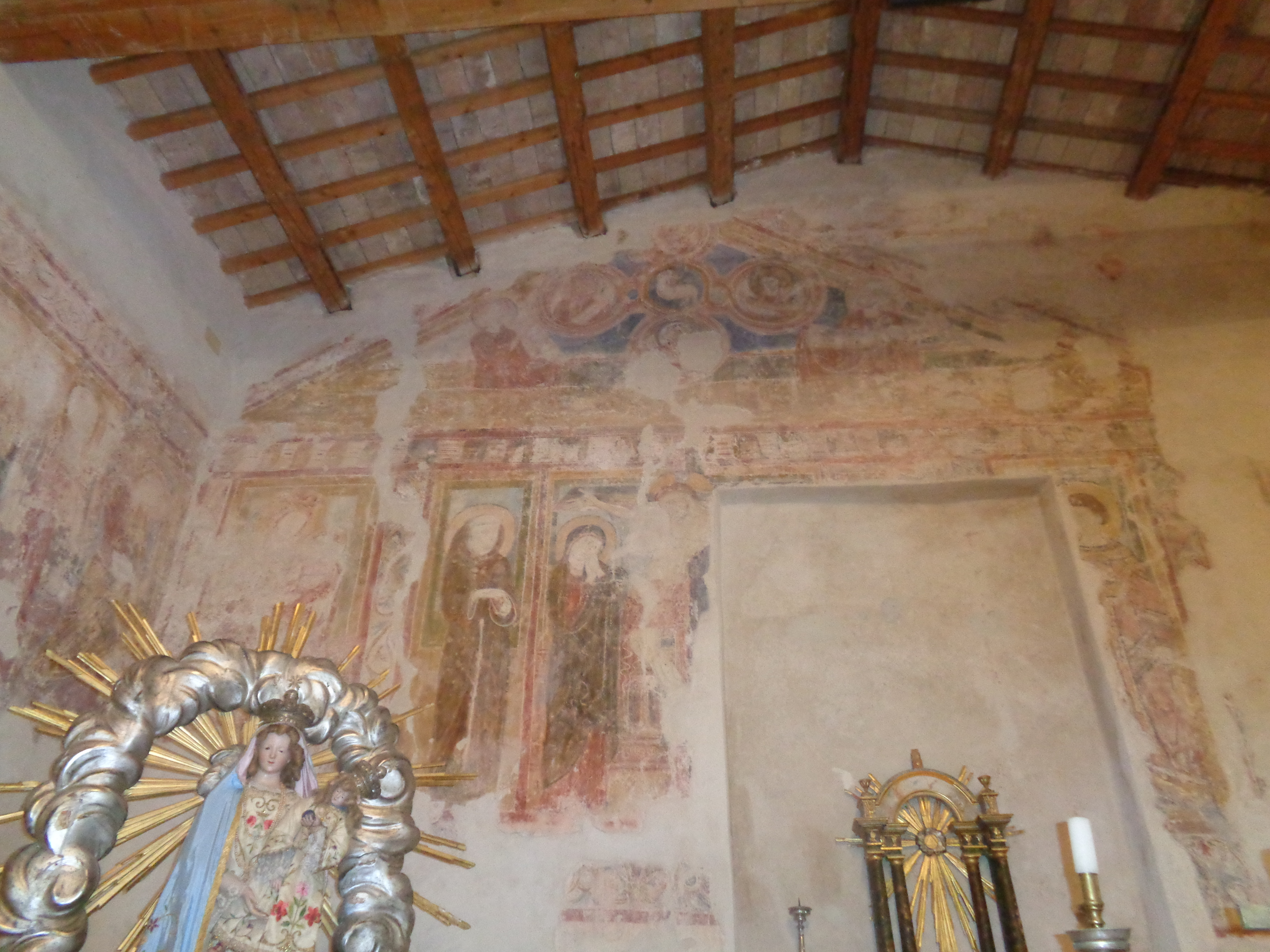

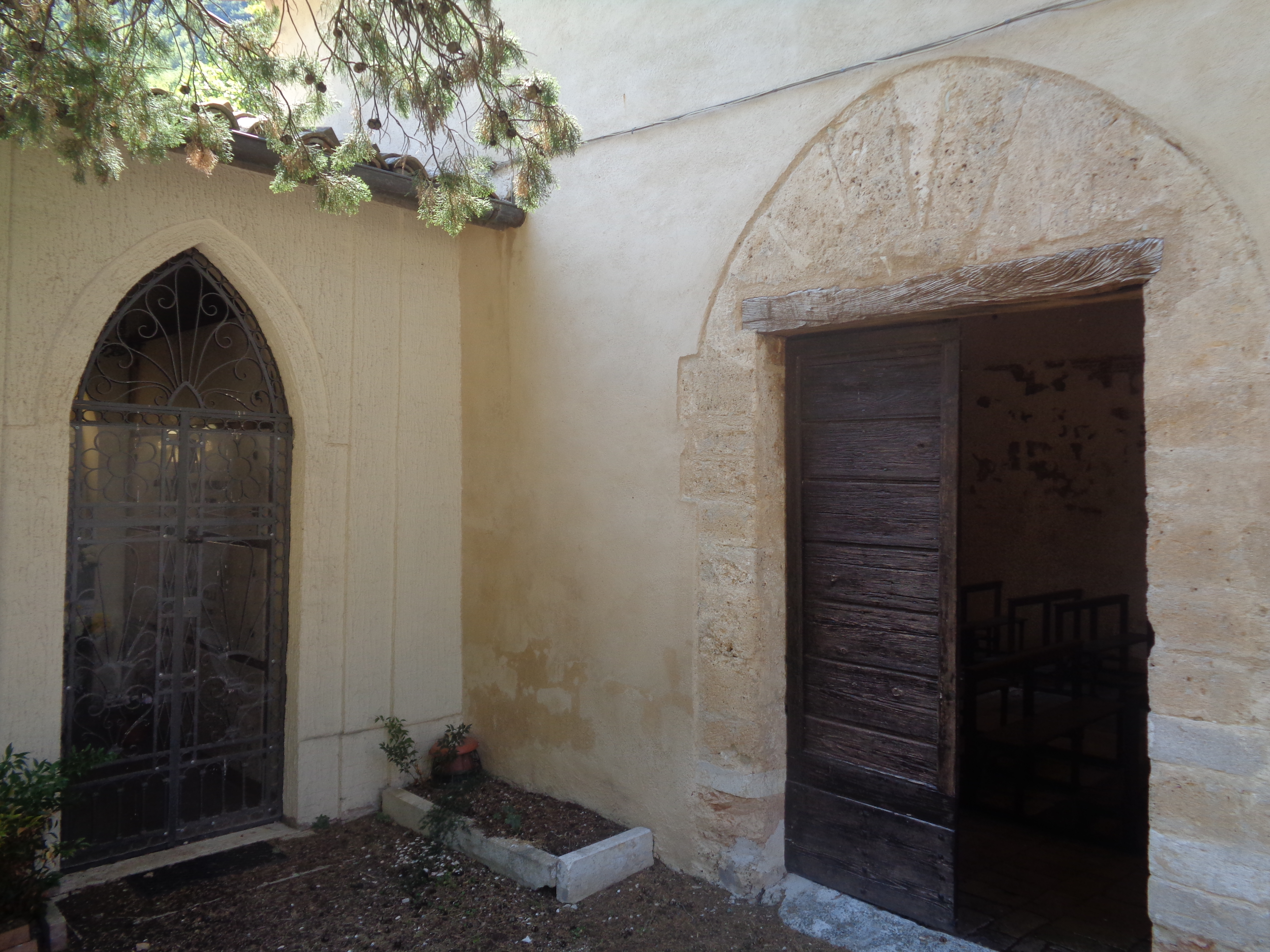
