= Sefro =

- Comune
- Comune di Sefro
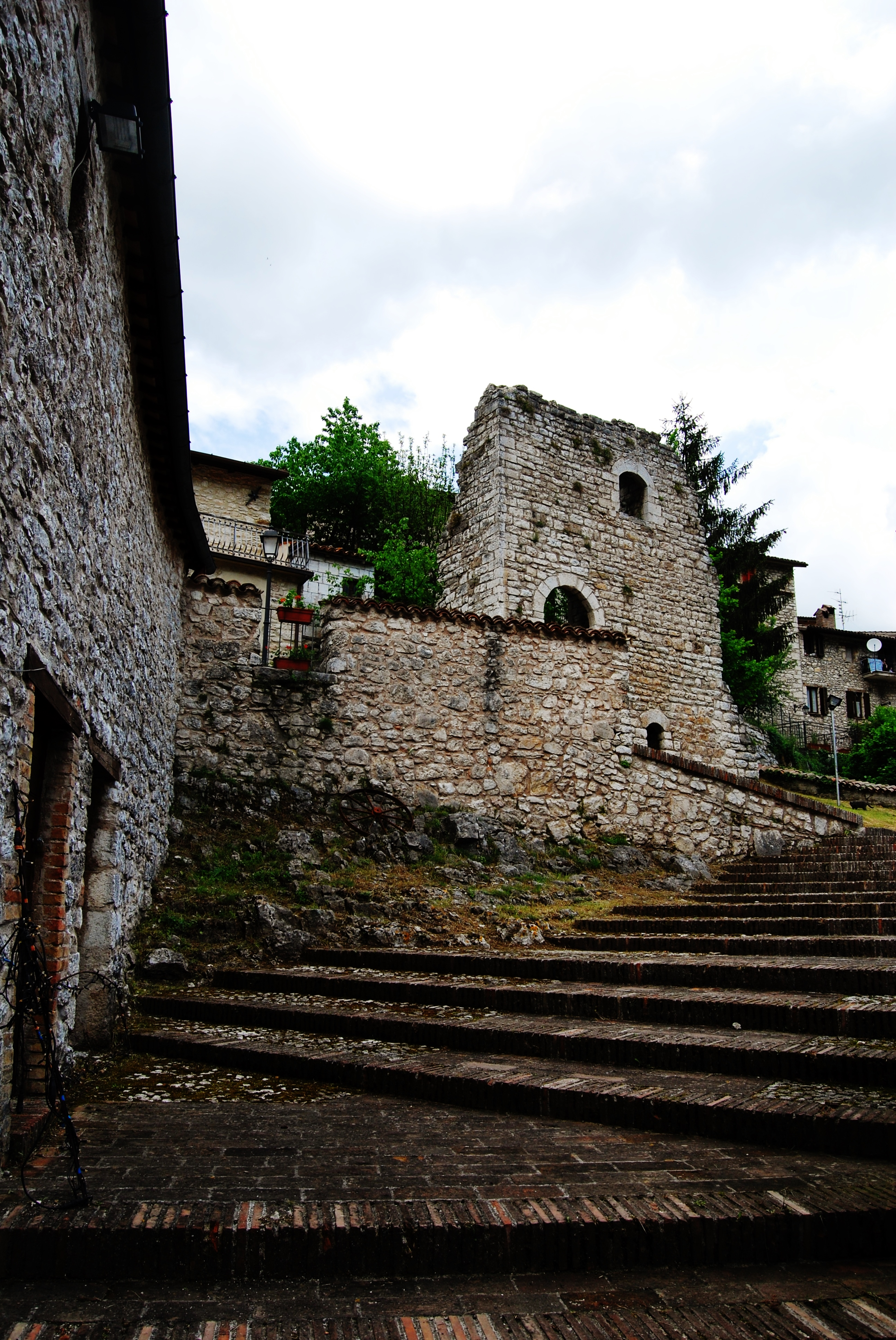

- Location within Italy Location within Marche
- Coordinates: 43°9′N 12°57′E
- Country: Italy
- Region: Marche
- Province: Province of Macerata (MC)
- Frazioni: Agolla, Sorti, Cerreto, Butino, Valle

Government
  - Mayor: Pietro Tapanelli (Noi per Sefro)

Area
  - Total: 42.5 km^{2} (16.4 sq mi)

Population (Dec. 2004)
  - Total: 426 [31−7−2,025]
  - Density: 10.0/km^{2} (26.0/sq mi)
- Demonym: Sefrani/Sefrensi
- Time zone: UTC+1 (CET)
  - Summer (DST): UTC+2 (CEST)
- Postal code: 62030
- Dialing code: 0737
- ISTAT code: 043050
- Patron saint: Madonna dell'Assunta
- Saint day: 15 august
- Website: https://www.comune.sefro.mc.it/

Sefro (Sifru in the local dialect) is a comune (municipality) in the Province of Macerata in the Italian region Marche, located about 70 kilometres (43 mi) southwest of Ancona and about 45 kilometres (28 mi) southwest of Macerata. As of 31 December 2004, it had a population of 453 and an area of 42.5 square kilometres (16.4 mi^{2}).

Sefro borders the following municipalities: Camerino, Fiuminata, Pioraco, Serravalle di Chienti.

Among the churches are:

- Madonna dei Calcinari.
- San Tossano.
- San Pietro.

== Demographic evolution ==
Historical population

Year	Pop.	±%
1861	1,068	—
1871	1,162	+8.8%
1881	1,207	+3.9%
1901	1,296	+7.4%
1911	1,413	+9.0%

Year	Pop.	±%
1921	1,458	+3.2%
1931	1,310	−10.2%
1936	1,272	−2.9%
1951	1,058	−16.8%
1961	846	−20.0%

Year	Pop.	±%
1971	587	−30.6%
1981	545	−7.2%
1991	483	−11.4%
2001	433	−10.4%

Source: Data from ISTAT
