= Madonna dei Calcinari, Sefro =

Church in Italy

Coordinates: 43°08′59.4″N 12°57′19.2″E

The Madonna dei Calcinari or Madonna dei Calcinai is a Roman Catholic church located in the town of Sefro, province of Macerata, region of Marche, Italy.

== History ==
The stone church was built in the 15th century. Inside the church are votive frescoes: Saints on the counter-façade (1457), a Madonna and Child above entry portal (1502), and a St Matthew (1544). The church suffered damage from the 1997 earthquakes.

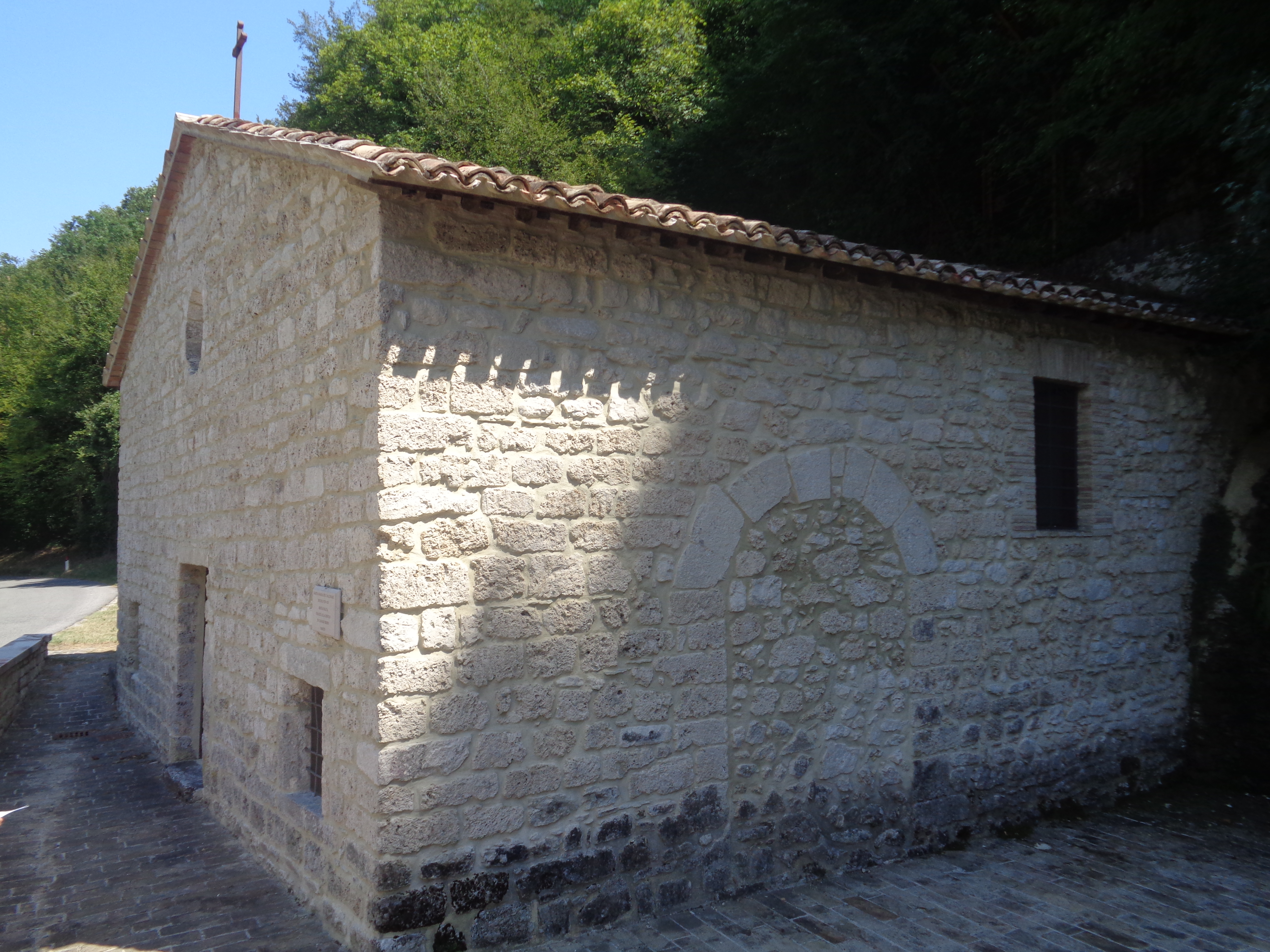

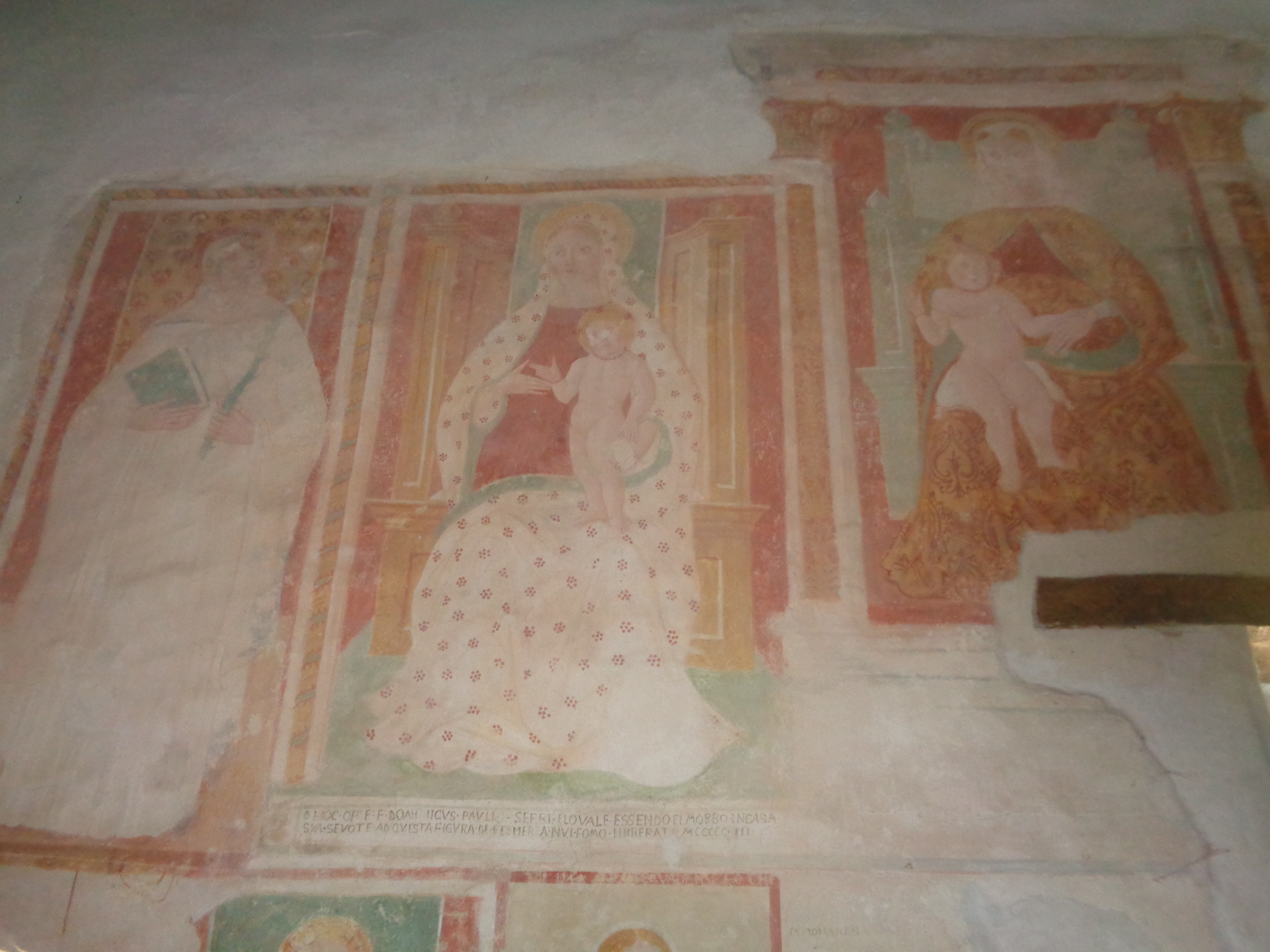

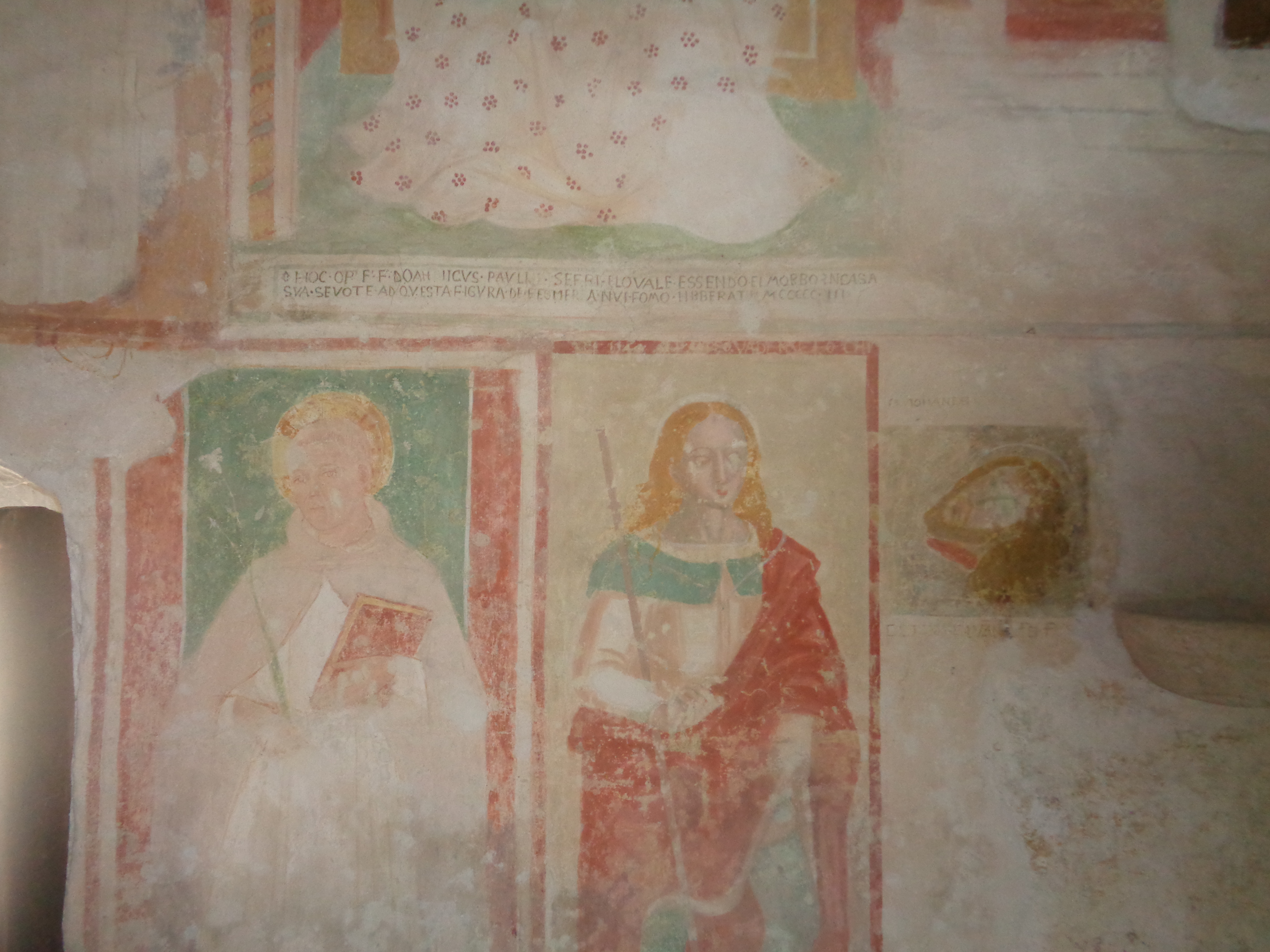
