= Monte Cavallo, Marche =

Monte Cavallo
- Comune
- Comune di Monte Cavallo
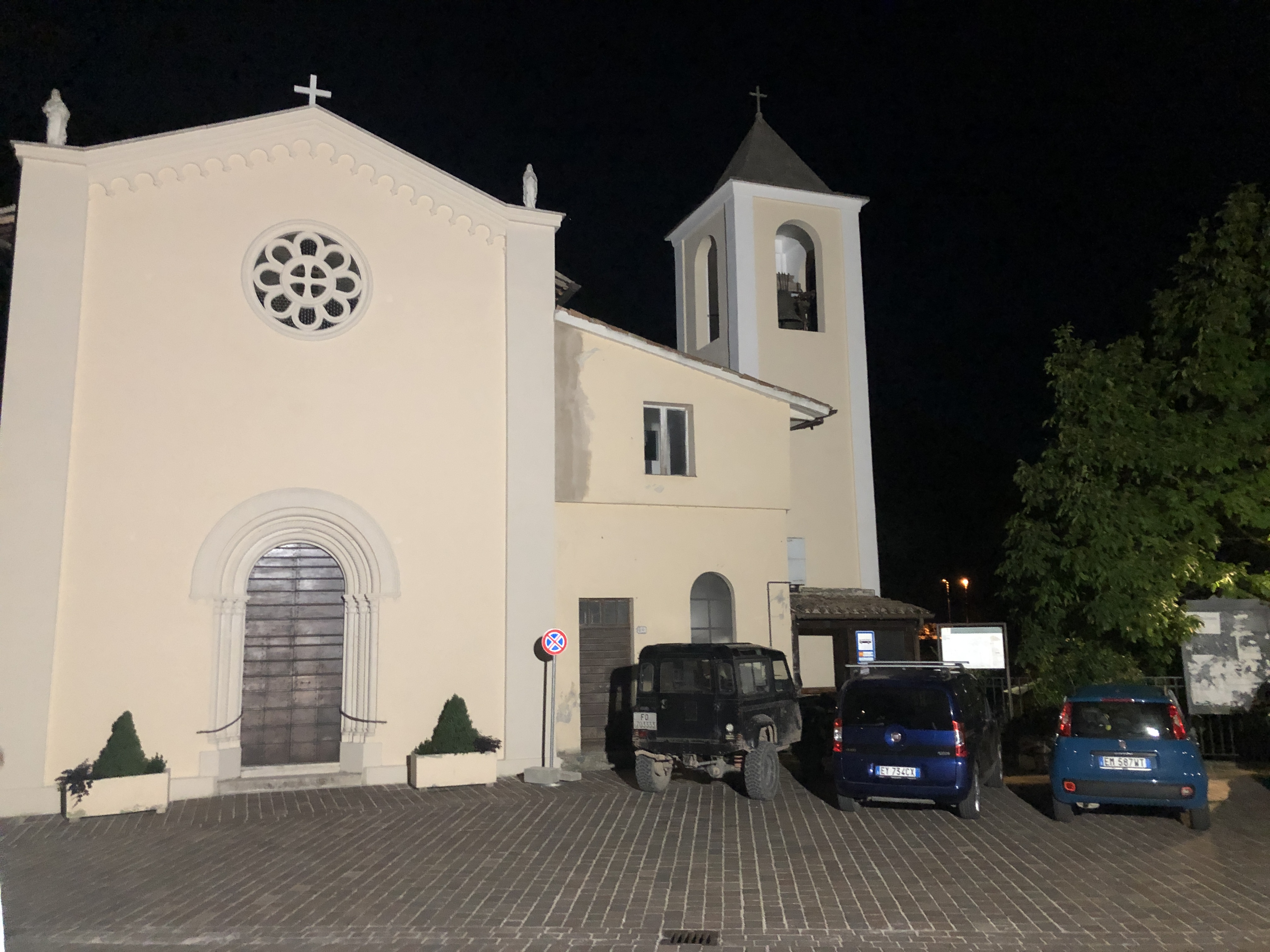

- Coat of arms
- Interactive map of Monte Cavallo
- Location within Italy Location within Marche
- Coordinates: 43°2′N 13°3′E
- Country: Italy
- Region: Marche
- Province: Macerata (MC)

Government
  - Mayor: Roberto Lotti

Area
  - Total: 38.9 km^{2} (15.0 sq mi)

Population (Dec. 2004)
  - Total: 160
  - Density: 4.1/km^{2} (11/sq mi)
- Demonym: Montecavallesi
- Time zone: UTC+1 (CET)
  - Summer (DST): UTC+2 (CEST)
- Postal code: 62030
- Dialing code: 0737
- Patron saint: St. Benedict of Nursia
- Saint day: March 21

Monte Cavallo is a comune (municipality) in the Province of Macerata in the Italian region Marche, located about 80 kilometres (50 mi) southwest of Ancona and about 45 kilometres (28 mi) southwest of Macerata.

Monte Cavallo borders the following municipalities: Pieve Torina, Serravalle di Chienti, Visso.

== Demographic evolution ==
Historical population

Year	Pop.	±%
1861	708	—
1871	801	+13.1%
1881	827	+3.2%
1901	891	+7.7%
1911	861	−3.4%

Year	Pop.	±%
1921	802	−6.9%
1931	740	−7.7%
1936	782	+5.7%
1951	692	−11.5%
1961	466	−32.7%

Year	Pop.	±%
1971	288	−38.2%
1981	265	−8.0%
1991	207	−21.9%
2001	171	−17.4%

Source: Data from ISTAT
