= Muccia =

- Comune
- Comune di Muccia
- Location within Italy Location within Marche
- Coordinates: 43°5′N 13°3′E
- Country: Italy
- Region: Marche
- Province: Province of Macerata (MC)
- Frazioni: Col di Giove, Costafiore, Giove, Maddalena, Massaprofoglio, Rocchetta, Vallicchio

Area
  - Total: 25.6 km^{2} (9.9 sq mi)

Population (Dec. 2004)
  - Total: 925
  - Density: 36.1/km^{2} (93.6/sq mi)
- Time zone: UTC+1 (CET)
  - Summer (DST): UTC+2 (CEST)
- Postal code: 62034
- Dialing code: 0737
- Website: Official website

Muccia is a comune (municipality) in the Province of Macerata in the Italian region Marche, located about 70 kilometres (43 mi) southwest of Ancona and about 40 kilometres (25 mi) southwest of Macerata. As of 31 December 2004, it had a population of 925 and an area of 25.6 square kilometres (9.9 mi^{2}).

== Geography ==
Muccia borders with the following municipalities: Camerino, Pieve Torina, Pievebovigliana and Serravalle di Chienti. Its territory includes 7 frazioni (civil parishes): Col di Giove, Costafiore, Giove, Maddalena, Massaprofoglio, Rocchetta and Vallicchio.

== Demographic evolution ==
Historical population

Year	Pop.	±%
1861	1,641	—
1871	1,698	+3.5%
1881	1,751	+3.1%
1901	1,691	−3.4%
1911	1,666	−1.5%

Year	Pop.	±%
1921	1,540	−7.6%
1931	1,476	−4.2%
1936	1,317	−10.8%
1951	1,282	−2.7%
1961	1,117	−12.9%

Year	Pop.	±%
1971	850	−23.9%
1981	812	−4.5%
1991	833	+2.6%
2001	907	+8.9%

Source: Data from ISTAT
