= San Cataldo, Esanatoglia =

Hermitage in Esanatoglia, Italy

The Eremo di San Cataldo (Hermitage of San Cataldo) is a Roman Catholic church and hermitage complex perched on a steep rocky outcropping outside of the town of Esanatoglia, province of Macerata, in the region of Marche, Italy. The site is dedicated to St Catald.

== History ==
The hermitage is documented in local statutes by 1324. It appears to have utilize stone from the site for construction. The present church was completed in the 18th century and has a baroque wooden altar. The complex includes some buildings used by the local monks. The lateral chapels have frescoes. The site was restored after the 1997 earthquake, with work completed in 2005.
