= San Sebastiano, Esanatoglia =

Church building in Esanatoglia, Italy

San Sebastiano is a Roman Catholic church located in the town of Esanatoglia, province of Macerata, in the region of Marche, Italy.

== History ==
A church at the site is documented since the 13th century. During the 16th to 17th centuries, the church was affiliated with the Confraternity of the Santissimo Sacramento. The interiors still have traces of 15th century frescoes once in a semicircular apse. The pronaos on the church appears to date from the 16th century. The exterior decoration appears to date to 1599. Much of the church derives from a 19th-century reconstruction. After the 1997 earthquake, the structure was restored.
