= Serravalle di Chienti =

- Comune
- Comune di Serravalle di Chienti
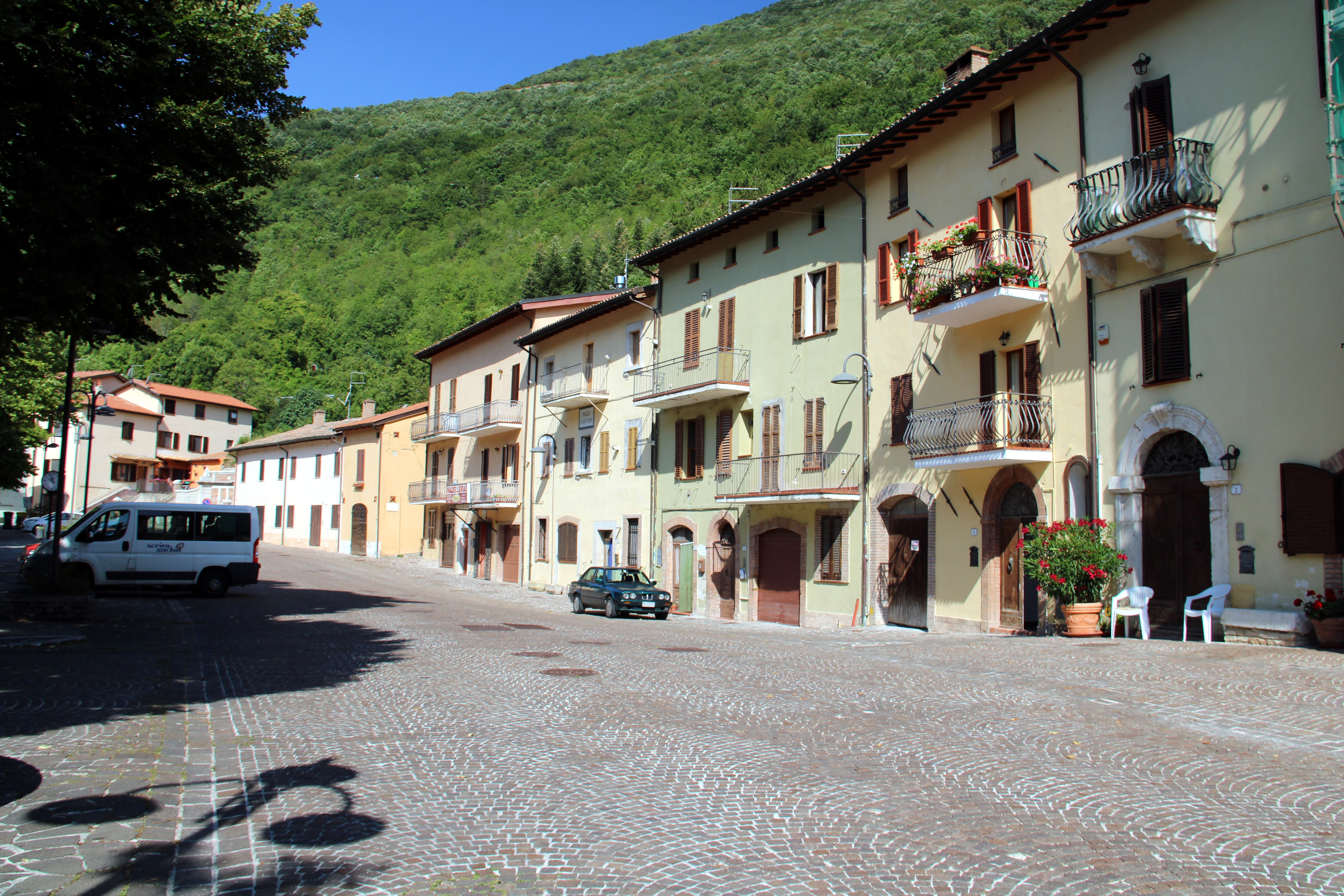

- Coat of arms

- Location within Italy Location within Marche
- Coordinates: 43°4′N 12°57′E
- Country: Italy
- Region: Marche
- Province: Macerata (MC)
- Frazioni: Acquapagana, Bavareto, Castello, Cesi, Civitella, Collecurti, Copogna, Corgneto, Costa, Dignano, Forcella, Gelagna (alta), Gelagna bassa, San Martino, Taverne

Government
  - Mayor: Gabriele Accadia

Area
  - Total: 95.99 km^{2} (37.06 sq mi)
- Elevation: 667 m (2,188 ft)

Population (28 February 2017)
  - Total: 1,044
  - Density: 10.88/km^{2} (28.17/sq mi)
- Demonym: Serravallesi
- Time zone: UTC+1 (CET)
  - Summer (DST): UTC+2 (CEST)
- Postal code: 62038
- Dialing code: 0737
- Patron saint: St. Lucy
- Saint day: December 13
- Website: Official website

Serravalle di Chienti is a comune (municipality) in the Province of Macerata in the Italian region Marche, located about 80 kilometres (50 mi) southwest of Ancona and about 50 kilometres (31 mi) southwest of Macerata. It is crossed by the Chienti river. The communal territory is largely mountainous with numerous woods and pastures.

Serravalle di Chienti borders the following municipalities: Camerino, Fiuminata, Foligno, Monte Cavallo, Muccia, Nocera Umbra, Pieve Torina, Sefro, Visso.

== History ==
Settled since pre-historic times, in antique times the Serravalle plateau featured a lake known as Plestinam Paludem. The area was subsequently ruled by the Etruscans and the Romans.

In the Middle Ages it was a fortress of the Da Varano family of Camerino.

== Main sights ==
- Parish church, with 16th-century frescoes by Simone and Giovanni de Magistris.
- Church of Santa Maria di Pistia or di Plestia, in proto-Romanesque style. It was built over an ancient pagan temple of the Umbrian goddess Cupra. Once the cathedral of the town of Plestia, it was destroyed, together with the latter, by Emperor Otto III. It was rebuilt around the year 1000, to which date the current crypt and apse. The nave and the portico are later.
- Convent of Brogliano.
- Botte dei Varano, an artificial channel built by Giulio Cesare da Varano in the 15th century to dry the Karst plateau of Colfiorito. Recent restorations have shown the presence of a pre-existing Roman travertine structure.

== Comunes ==
- Cesi
