= San Martino, Esanatoglia =

Church building in Esanatoglia, Italy

Coordinates: 43.25189°N 12.94708°E

San Martino is a Renaissance-style Roman Catholic church located on Corso Vittorio Emanuele II #41 in the town of Esanatoglia, province of Macerata, in the region of Marche, Italy.

== History ==
A church at the site is documented since 1233, but it has undergone numerous reconstructions, including in 1311 and 1493. It was made a collegiate church by Cardinal Alessandro Farnese.

The simple façade is made of brick and stucco and has a painting of the saint in a rectangular niche. Near the apse rises the medieval stone bell tower.

The interior houses rich decorations including a sculptural ensemble (1631) representing the Immaculate Conception, St Anne, St Joachim, a young John the Baptist, and St Joseph. The church has a choir loft from the 17th century.

The steps in front of the church lead down to the Fonte di San Martino. This 12th-century fountain still functions to allow water by gravity to flow to two basins.
