= Iglesia de la Magdalena, Toledo =

Church in Toledo, Spain

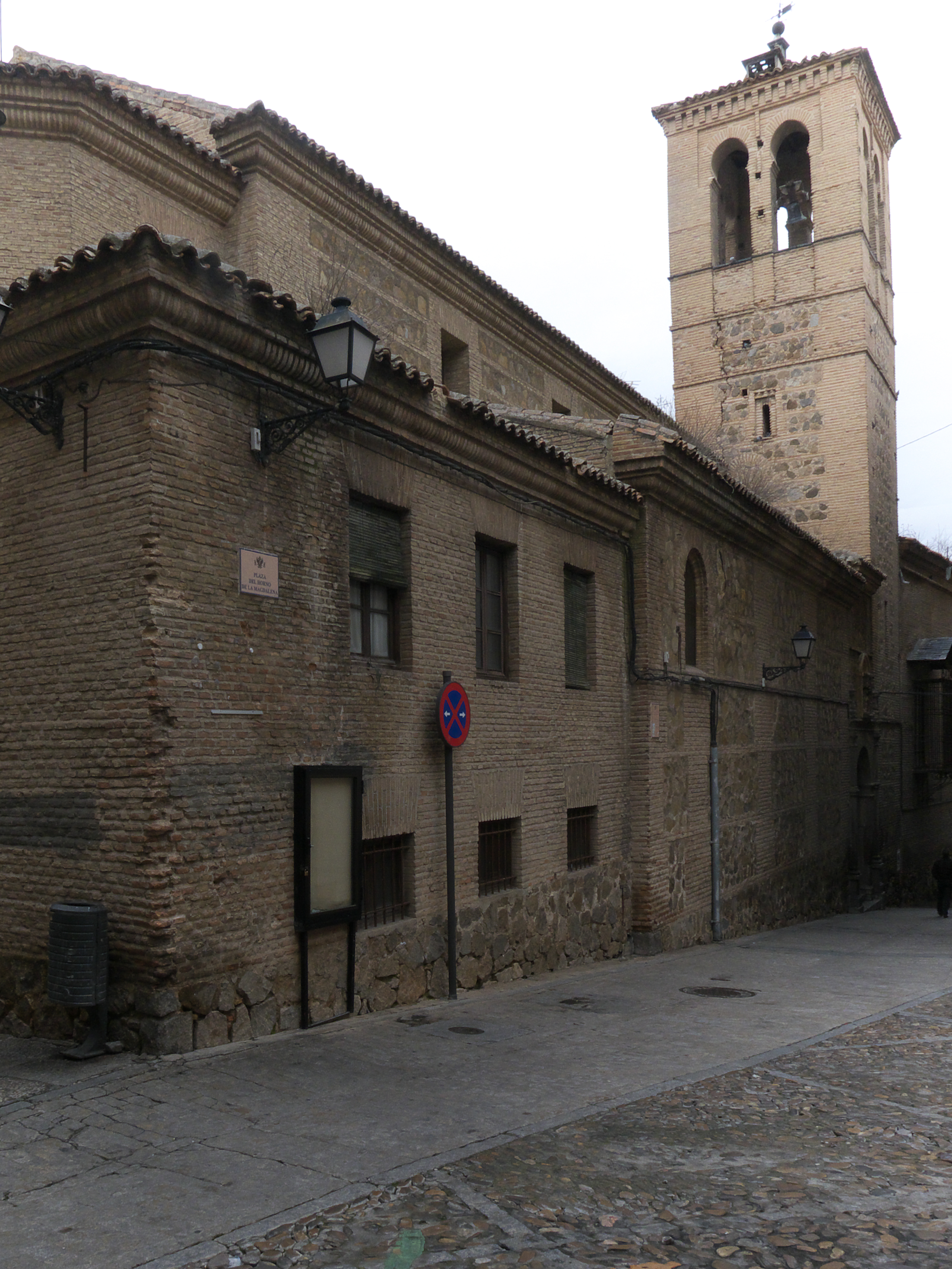
Iglesia de la Magdalena

The Iglesia de la Magdalena is a church located in the city of Toledo, in Castile-La Mancha, Spain. Named after Mary Magdalene (one of the companions of Jesus), it was founded by Mozarabs during Muslim rule.

== History ==
Its oldest documentary mention dates from 1153, and should have been in its beginnings a typical Mudéjar church. At present, the oldest part of the Church is the tower, which dates back to the 14th century and which initially stood as a separate structure. The church was later reformed in the 15th, 16th, 17th and 18th centuries, highlighting the Chapel of Nuestra Señora del Buen Suceso (now the Virgen del Amparo).

Located very close to the Alcázar and the Plaza de Zocodover, the church suffered in 1936 with harsh effects of bombing and fighting during the siege of the Alcázar. Several images were mutilated with blows and axes by Republicans. The most valuable loss was that of the famous Christ of the Waters, protagonist of an old legend.

The building was restored after the Civil War, but is no longer an active Roman Catholic church, and has been designated for the use of a restoration workshop.
