= Santa Maria Madalena =

Santa Maria Madalena may refer to:

- Santa Maria Madalena, Rio de Janeiro, Brazil
- Santa Maria Madalena, a chapel in Madeira, Portugal

== See also ==
- Mary Magdalene, a saint
- Santa Maria Maddalena (disambiguation)
