= Santa Maria Maddalena, Ravenna =

Catholic church in Emilia Romagna region, Italy

Coordinates: 44°24′59.2″N 12°11′59.1″E

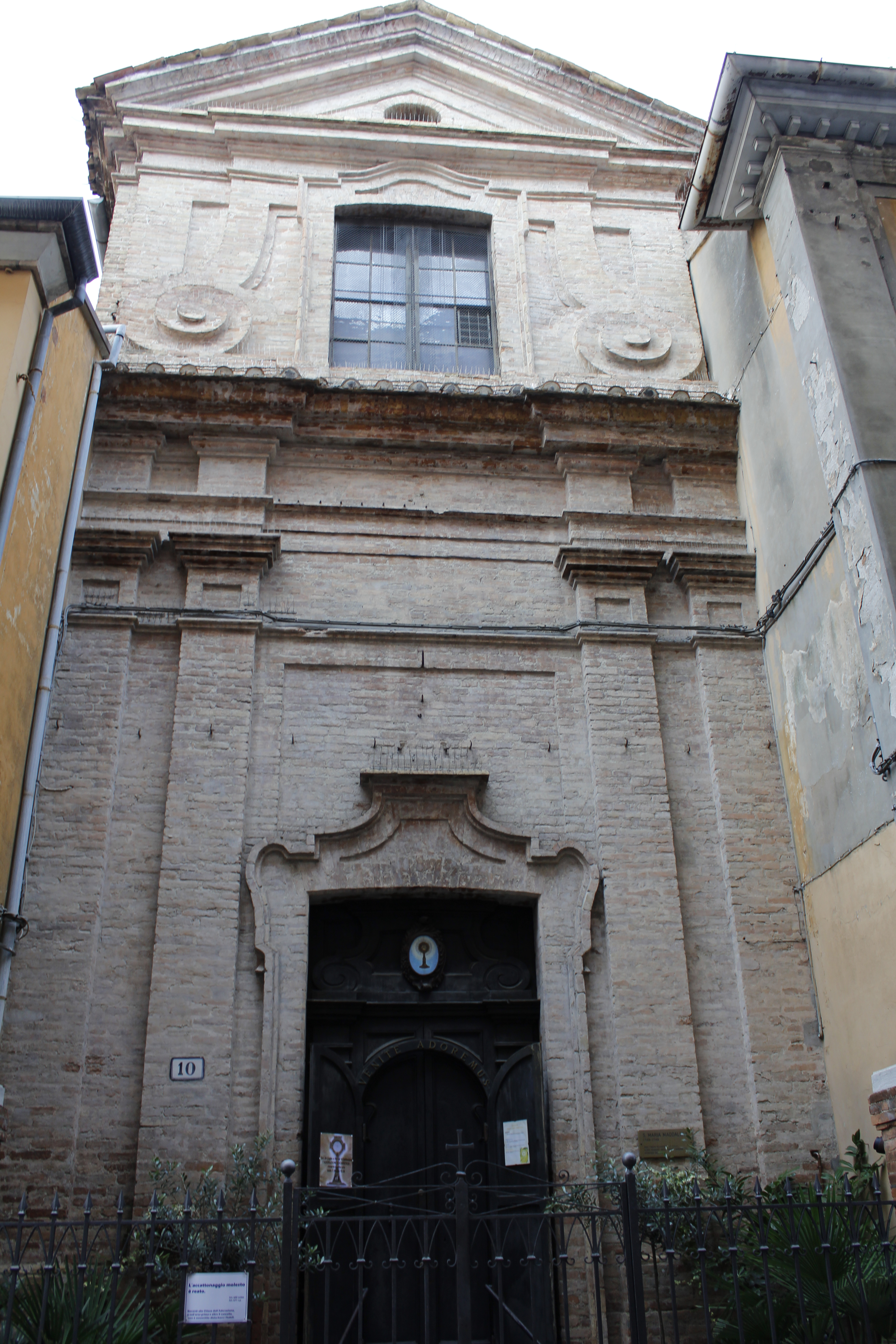
Façade towards Via Corrado Ricci

Santa Maria Maddalena is a Baroque-style, Roman Catholic church located on Via Ricci #10 in Ravenna, region of Emilia Romagna, Italy.

The church was designed by Camaldolese monk Fausto Pellicciotti, and erected between 1748 and 1750, likely on the site of a church named Santa Maria in Luminibus or in Luminaria. The interior has altarpieces by Andrea Barbiani and his brother Domenico.

An inventory from 1835, also lists paintings by Domenico Corvi (Magdalen walks to Calvary) and Marcello Leopardi (Deposition at Calvary.
