= Pililla Church =

Roman Catholic church in Rizal, Philippines

- Diocesan Shrine & Parish of St. Mary Magdalene
- Diyosesis na Dambana at Parokya ni Santa Maria Magdalena (Filipino)
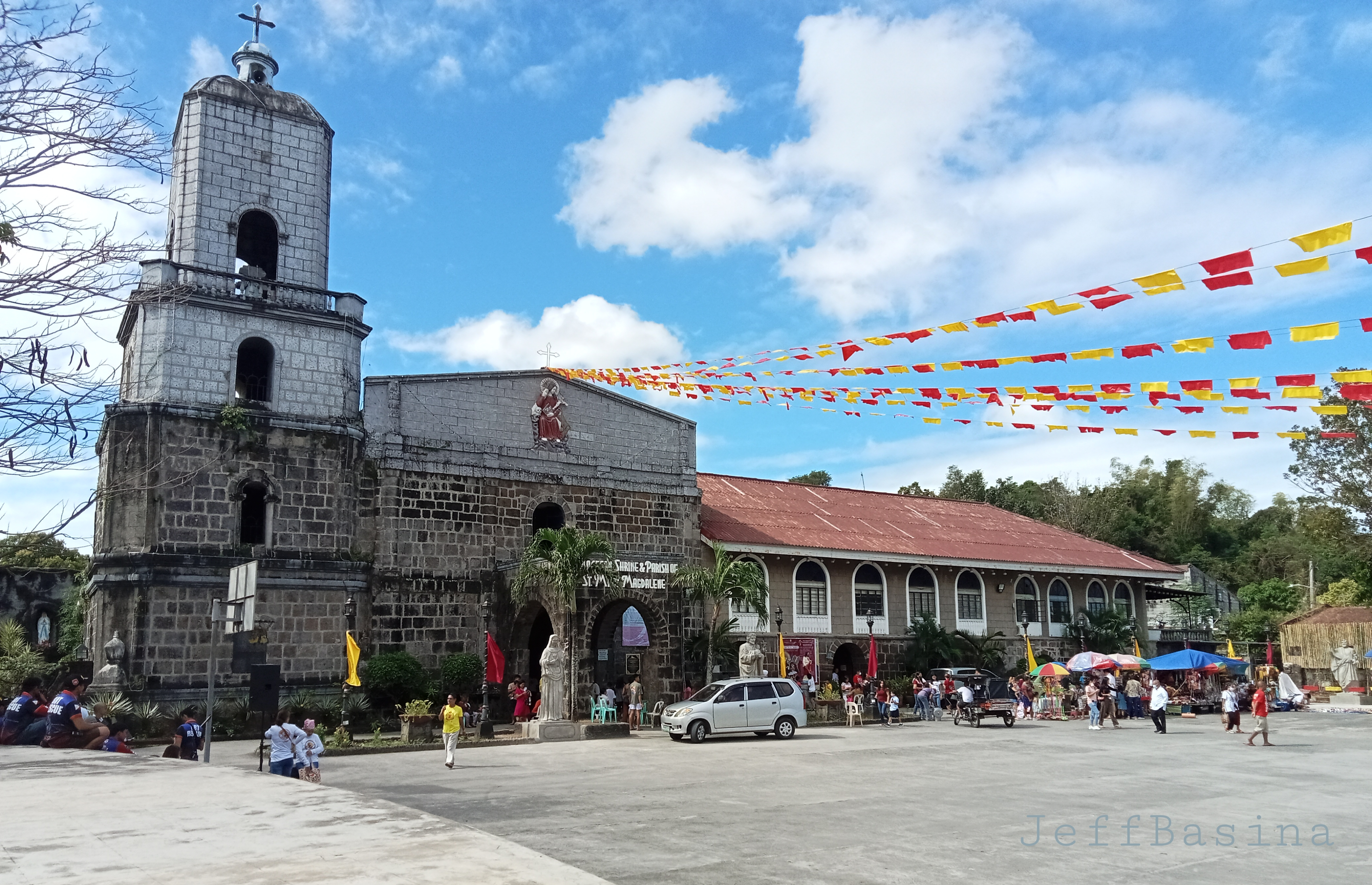
- Church façade in 2023

- Location in Luzon Location in the Philippines
- 14°28′48″N 121°18′24″E
- Location: Brgy. Imatong, Pililla 1910 Rizal
- Country: Philippines
- Denomination: Roman Catholic

History
- Status: Diocesan Shrine
- Founded: 1583
- Founder(s): Juan de Plasencia and Diego Oropesa
- Dedication: Mary Magdalene
- Dedicated: July 20, 2018

Architecture
- Functional status: Active
- Architectural type: Church building

Administration
- Province: Rizal
- Archdiocese: Archdiocese of Manila
- Diocese: Diocese of Antipolo
- Parish: Diocesan Shrine and Parish of St. Mary Magdalene

Clergy
- Archbishop: Jose Fuerte Advincula
- Bishop: Ruperto Cruz Santos
- Priest: Jeffrey B. Quintela

The Diocesan Shrine and Parish of Saint Mary Magdalene, commonly known as Pililla Church, is a Roman Catholic church located in the municipality of Pililla, Rizal, Philippines. It is under the jurisdiction of the Diocese of Antipolo. The church was built by the Franciscans in 1583, under the patronage of Saint Mary Magdalene. It is a few kilometers away from San Ildefonso Parish Church, a historical church in Tanay.

On January 16, 1977, the National Historical Commission of the Philippines unveiled the historical marker of St. Mary Magdalene Parish Church.

On July 22, 2018, the parish church was declared a diocesan shrine.

== History ==
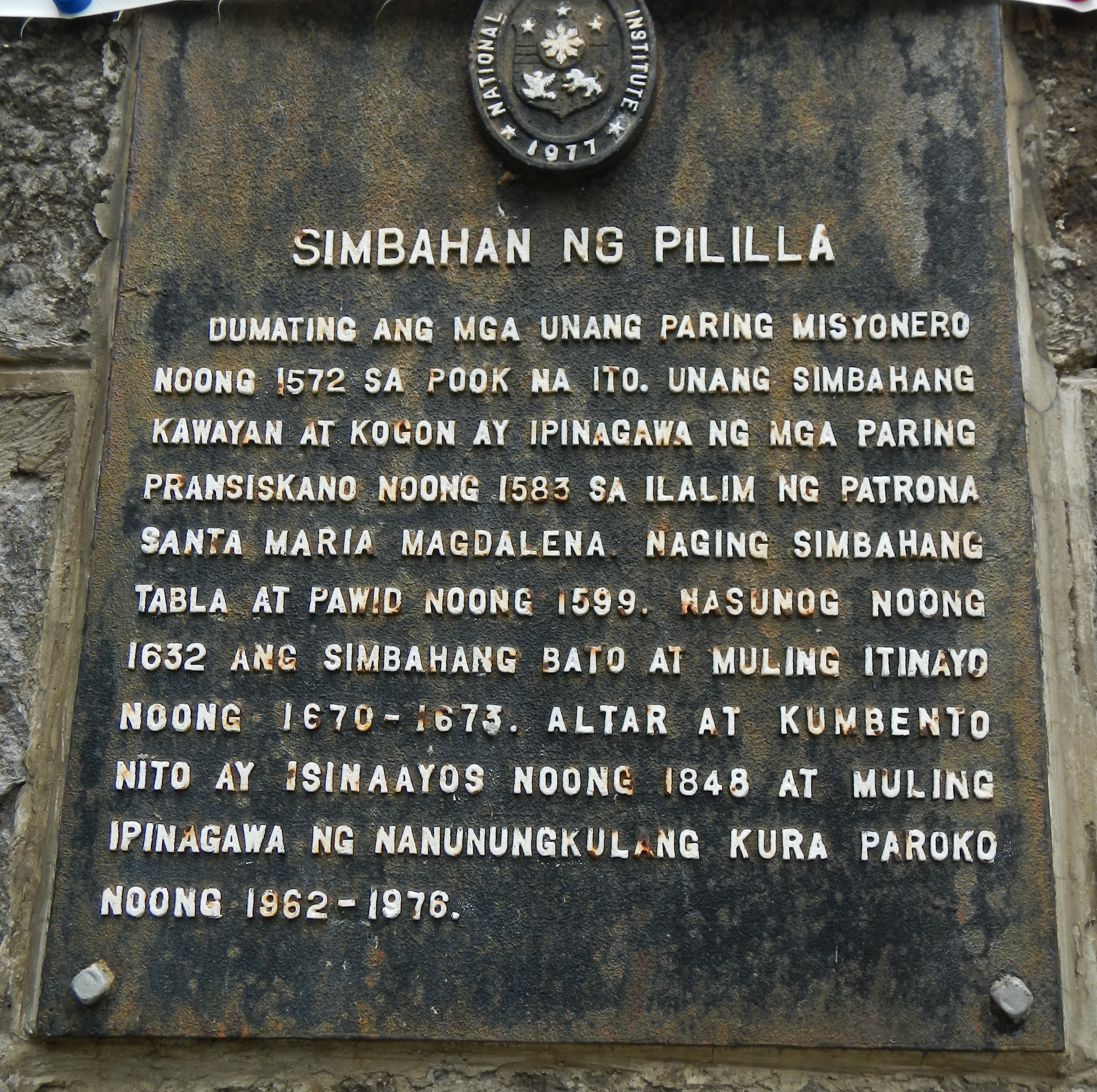
Church NHI historical marker installed in 1977

In 1571, the Spaniards conquered and inhabited the towns along Laguna de Bay. Prior to Spanish colonization, Pililla was named Pilang Munti. It was incorporated to the administration of Morong and was named Pilang Morong.

Franciscan priests led by Diego de Oropesa and Juan de Plasencia arrived at Pilang Morong in 1572. As part of the established reducciones system, the Franciscans built the first church made from cogon and nipa in 1583. When Pilang Morong was given autonomy in 1599, the central government granted an authorization to construct a church of stone.

In 1632, a conflagration destroyed the church and the whole town. When a new church was built, another fire ruined the church in 1668. A new church was immediately completed between 1670 and 1673. Renovation of the church altar and the adjacent convent were completed in 1848. Several renovation projects were also completed between 1962 and 1976.

== Features ==
The church is made of adobe, similar to other churches in Laguna. The façade and belfry of the church are simple in design. The baptistery is located at the bottom of the bell tower, on the left side from the vestibule of the church. A small retablo housing the image of Mary Magdalene can be found inside the baptistery.

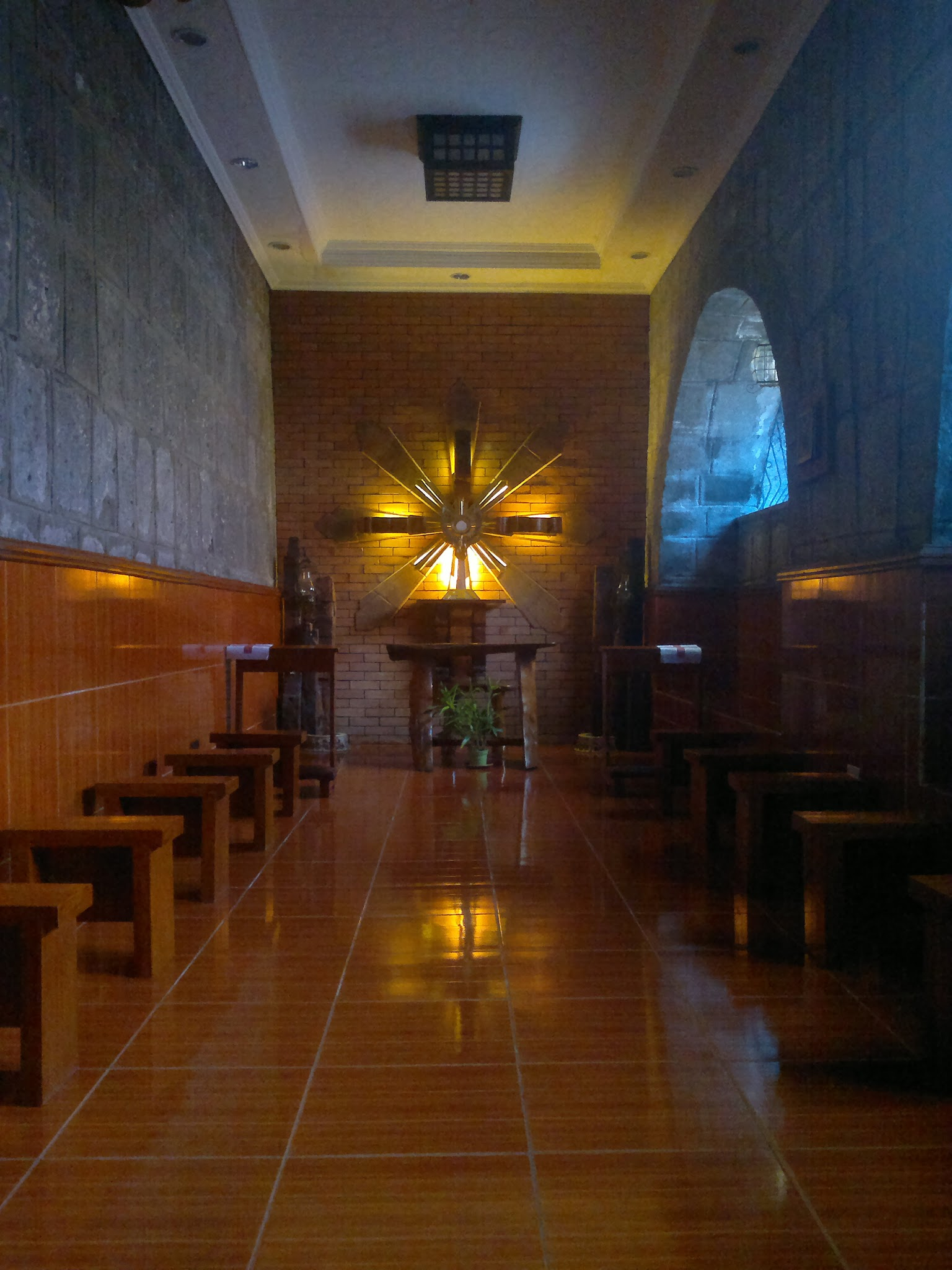
Adoration chapel

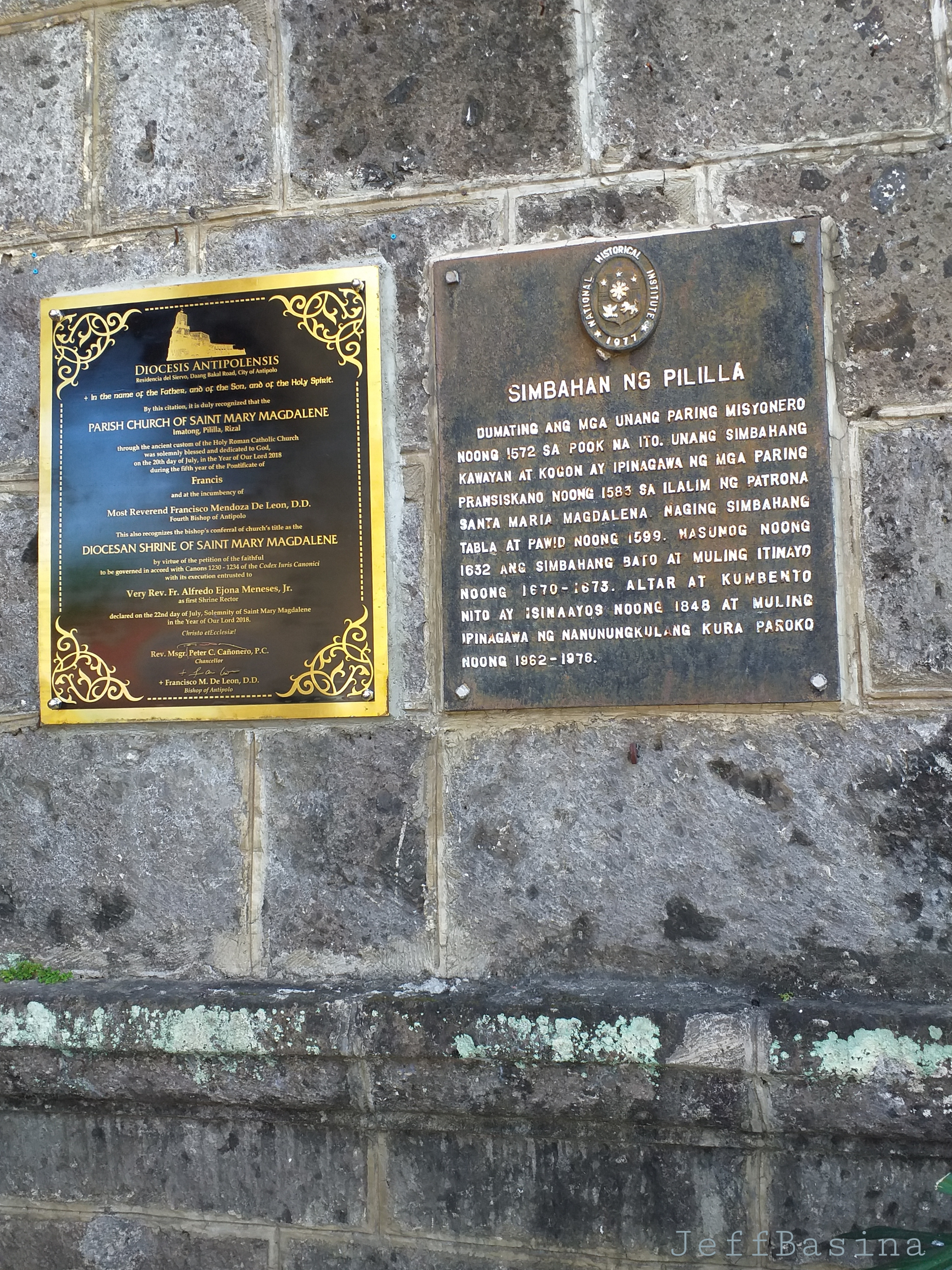
The NHCP church marker (right) and the marker inscribing its declaration as a diocesan shrine (left)

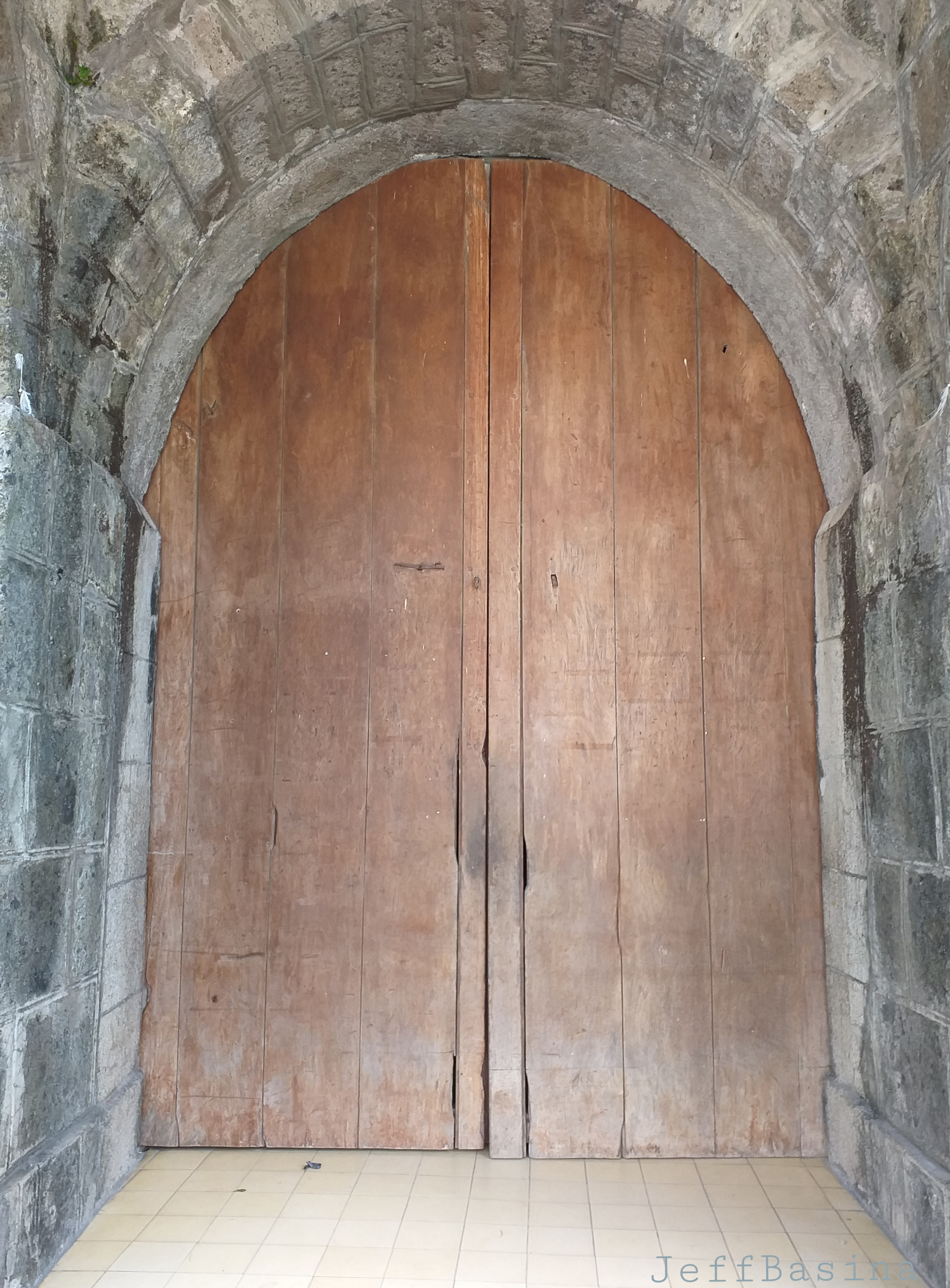
The main door of the church

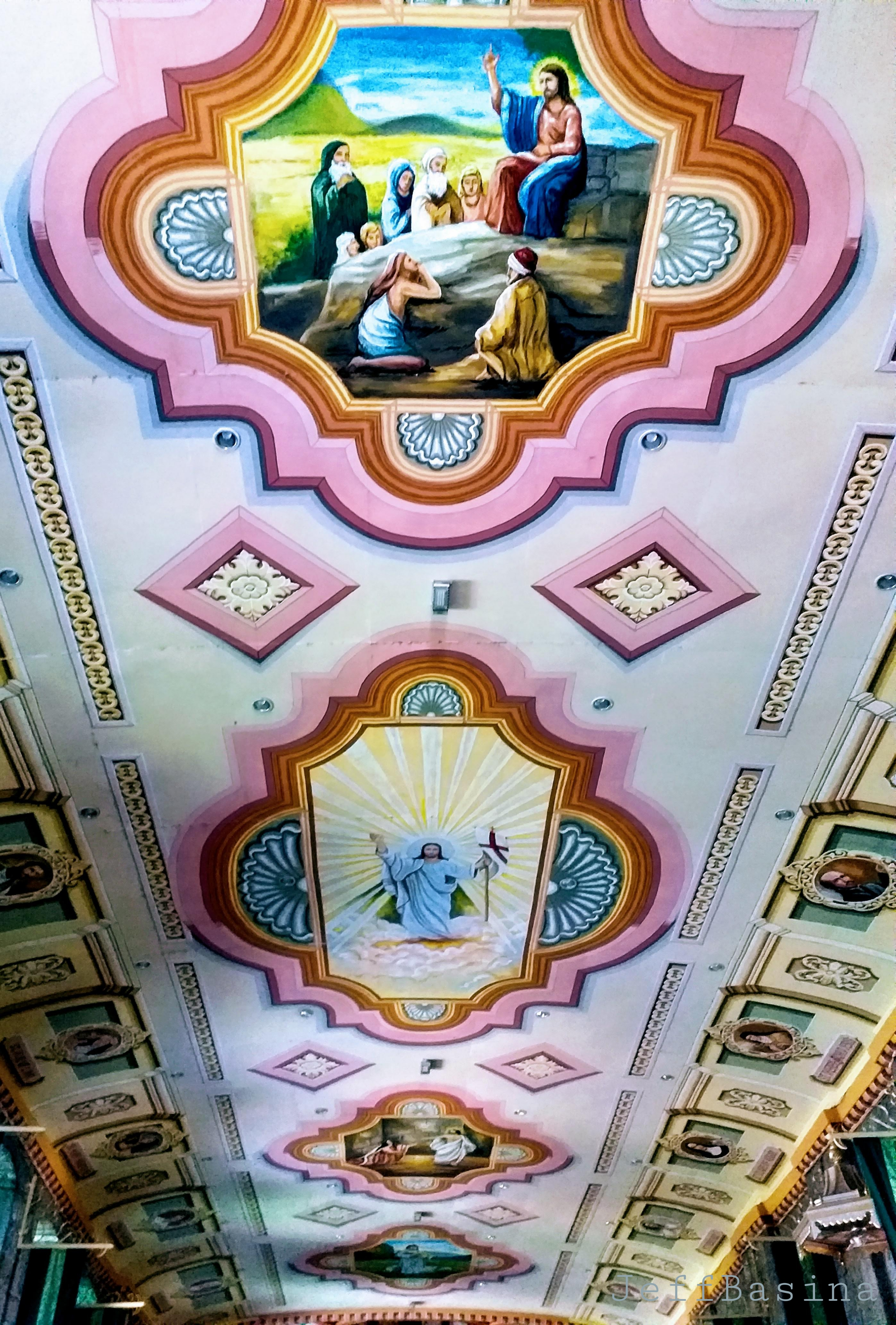
Details of the church ceiling

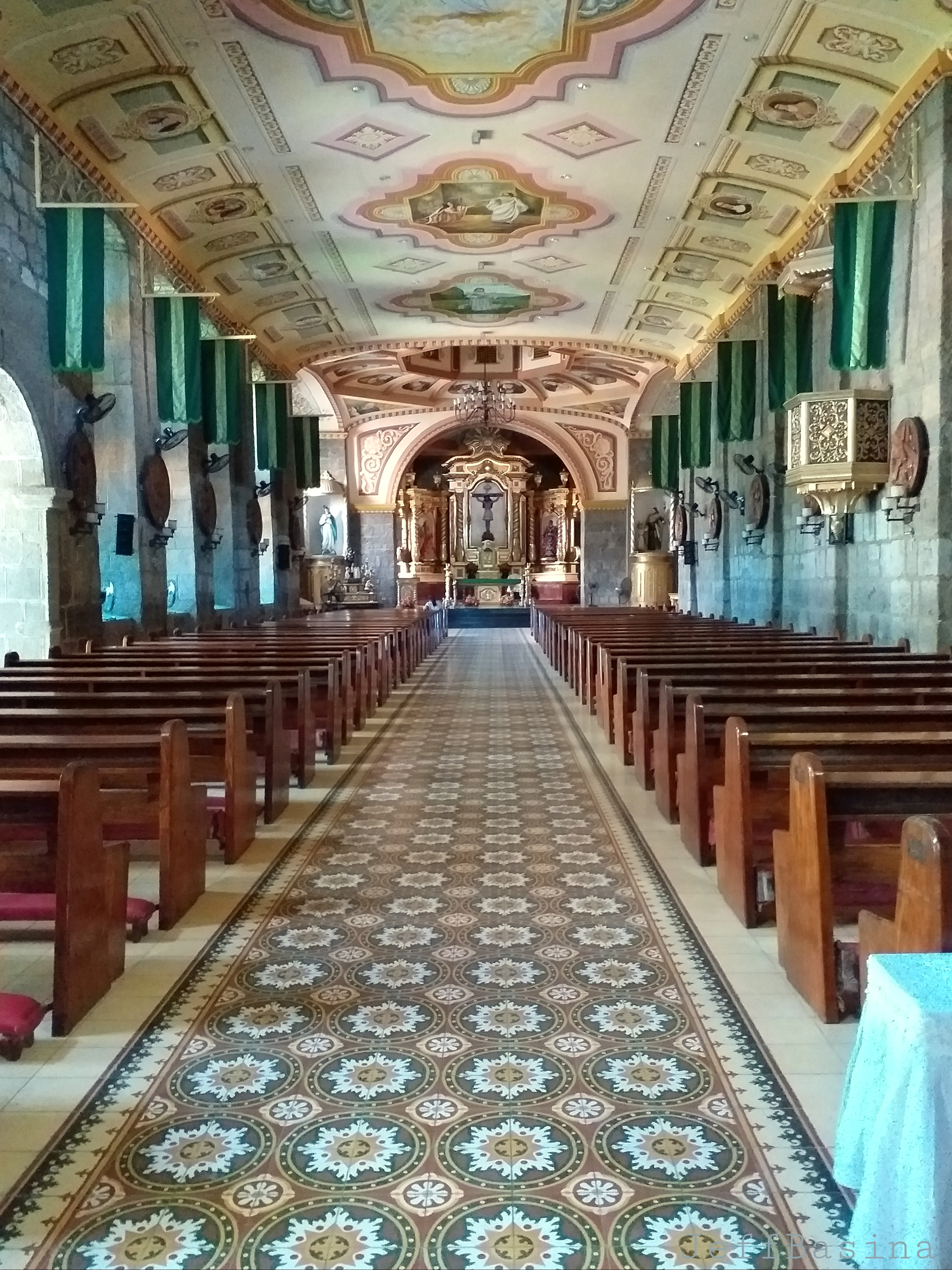
Church nave in 2020

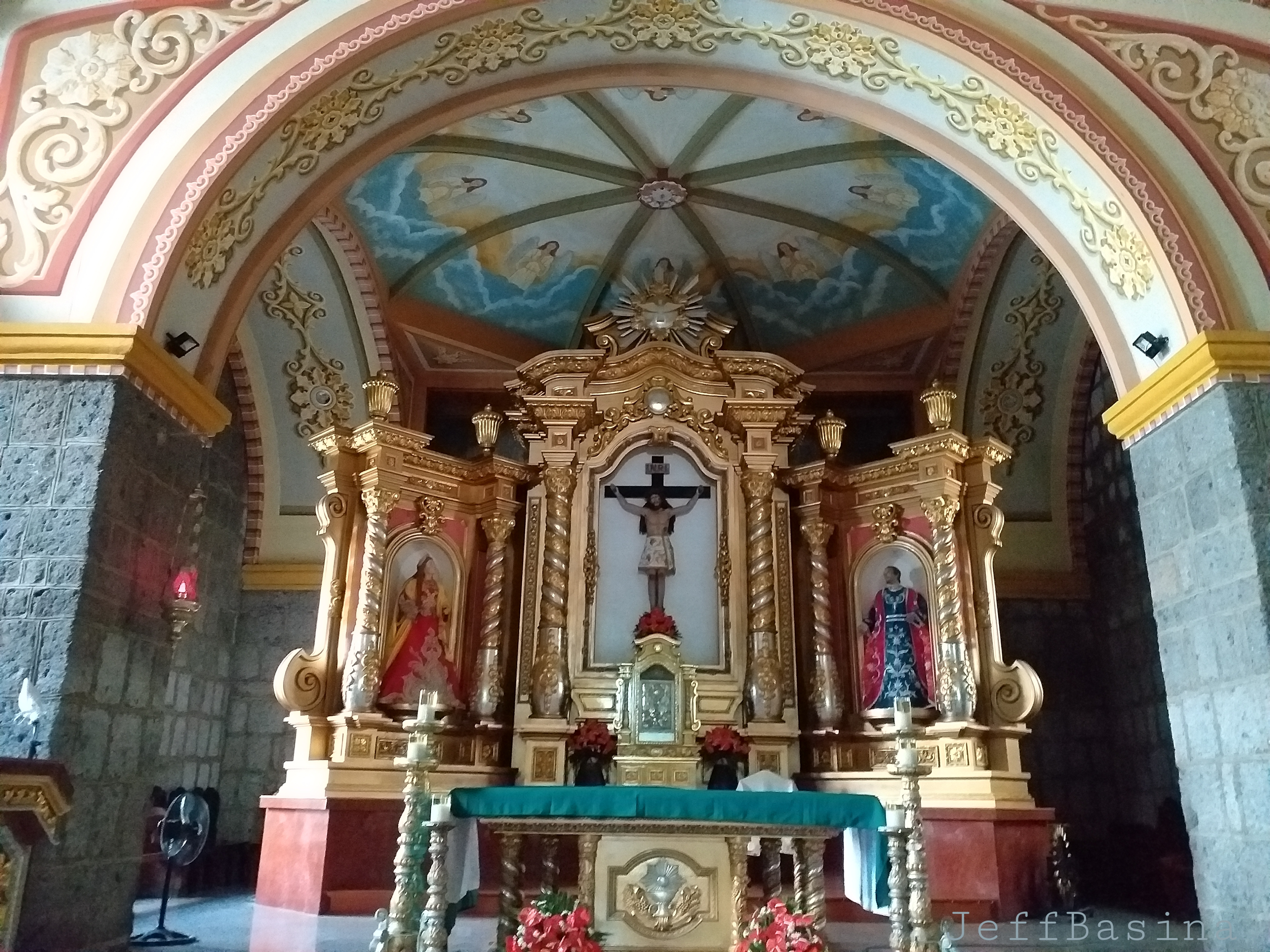
Church main altar and reredos

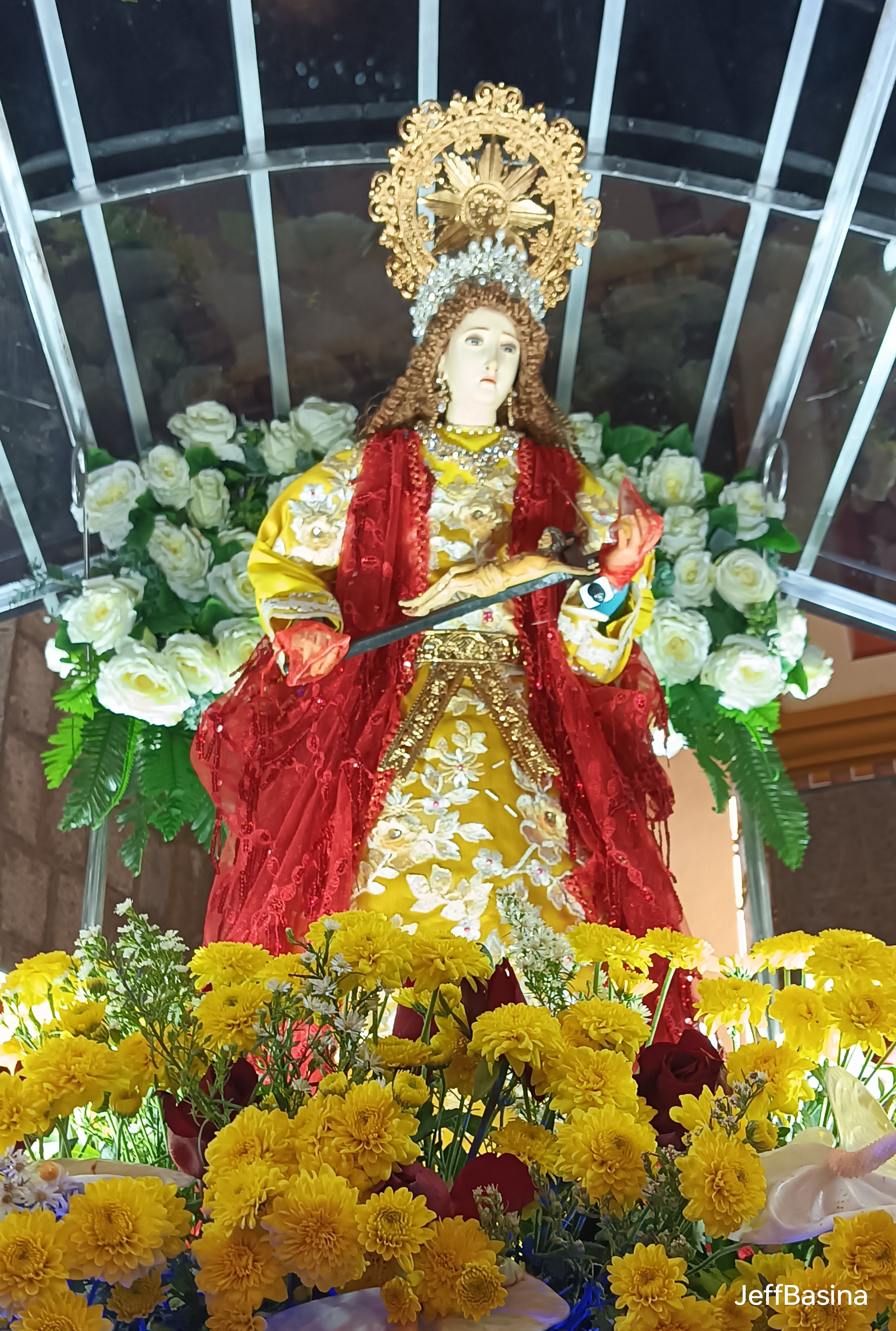
Ivory Processional Image of Saint Mary Magdalene
