= Santa Maria Maddalena, Esanatoglia =

Catholic church in Macerata province, Italy

Coordinates: 43°15′07.4″N 12°56′52.9″E

Santa Maria Maddalena is a Baroque-style Roman Catholic church located on Via Bartocci in the town of Esanatoglia, province of Macerata, in the region of Marche, Italy.

== History ==
A church was present at the site prior to the 16th century, known as Santa Maria Maddalena de Insula, and linked to a Benedictine order nunnery under the rule of the Abbey of Sant'Angelo infra Ostia. The church was rebuilt in the late 17th century in an oval layout. While the exterior façade is plain, the portal in white stone is elegant. The main altarpiece is made of gilded wood, and houses a 17th-century altarpiece depicting a Crucifixion with the Virgin and Saints John the Evangelist, Mary Magdalen, Clare, and Francis. The wooden choir loft, on the counterfacade, has twelve panels with paintings depicting Saints and landscapes. In the early 19th century, the convent was suppressed and it became a nursing home. The convent has a fresco cycle (early 15th-century) attributed to Ottaviano Nelli.
