= Santa María Magdalena, Córdoba =

Church in Córdoba, Spain

Coordinates: 37°53′07″N 04°46′09″W

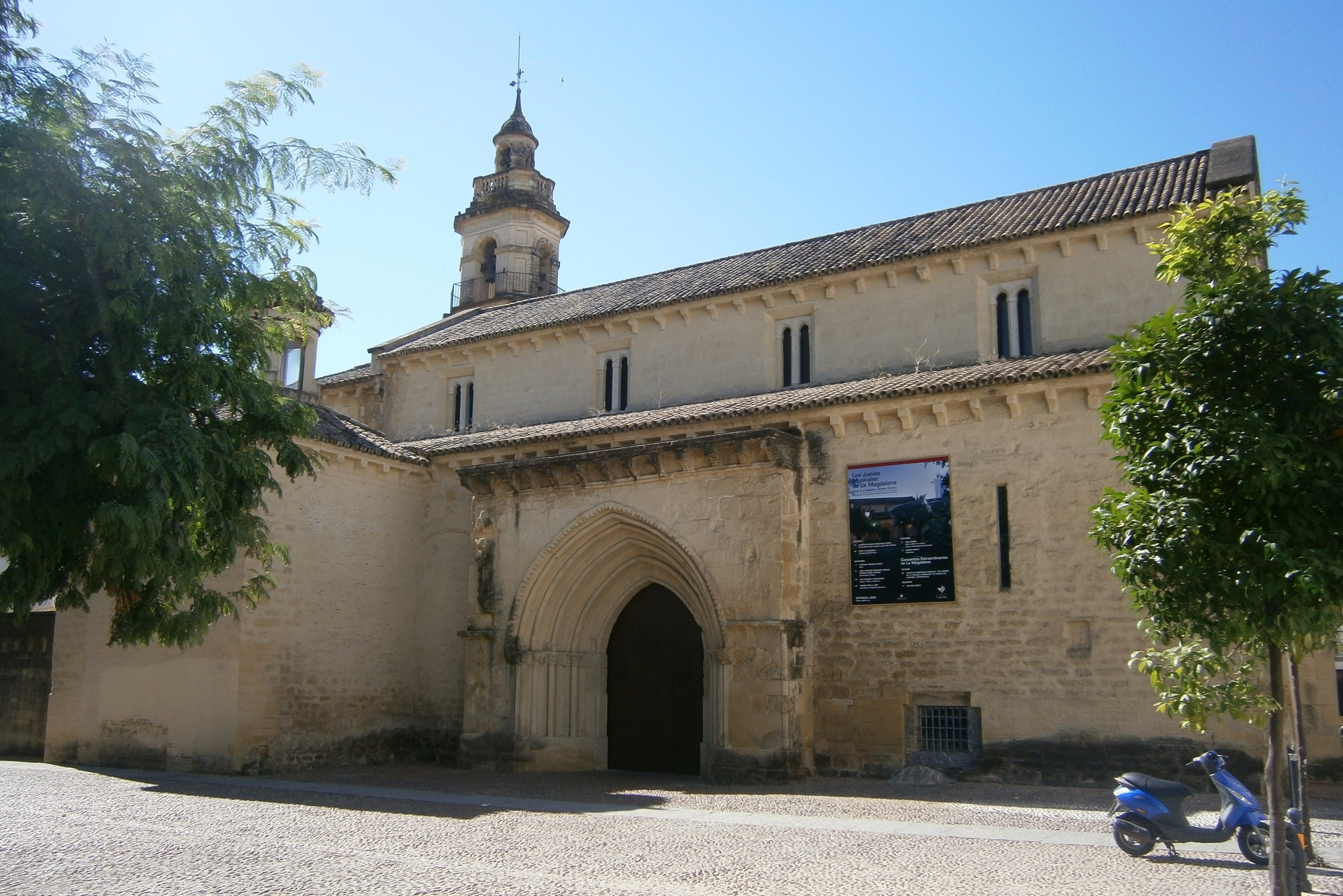
St Mary Magdalene Church, Córdoba

Santa María Magdalena (St Mary Magdalene Church) is a church in Córdoba, Spain, built in the Mudejar style. It forms part of the Historic centre of Córdoba, a UNESCO World Heritage site, and is named after Jesus' companion, Mary Magdalene.

The church of Santa Mariá Magdalena was one of the first of 12 churches Fernando III built after conquering Córdoba in 1236. Located in the prosperous neighbourhood of La Magdelena east of the city centre, it served as a model for later churches. It combines the Romanesque, Gothic and Mudejar styles of architecture. The main entrance is at the west end of the church below a rose window. The side door on the south side, the oldest in Córdoba, presents an alfiz with decorations of pointed diamonds. The 17th-century tower consists of sections which become narrower towards the top.

While there is little documentary evidence of the history of the church, it is known that its construction was well advanced by the end of the 13th century. Over the years, the building has undergone several transformations. The sacristy is an addition from the early 16th century while plastered ceiling vaults were added in the 18th century, covering the medieval woodwork until they were recently removed.

In 1990, the church was seriously damaged by fire. Thereafter it was no longer used as a church and was deconsecrated. Now owned by the Cajasur bank, it is a venue for concerts and other cultural events.

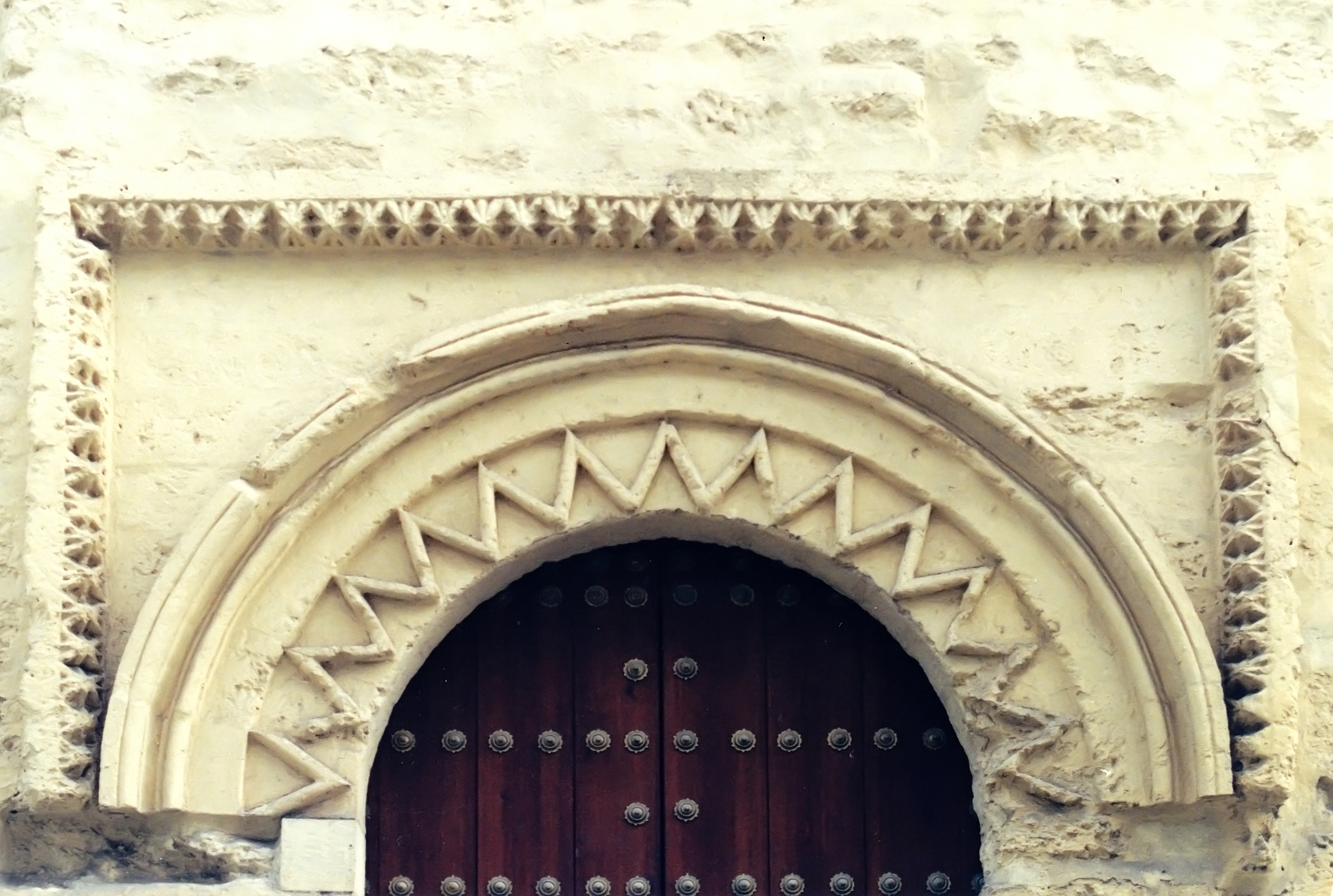
Side door decorated with pointed diamonds

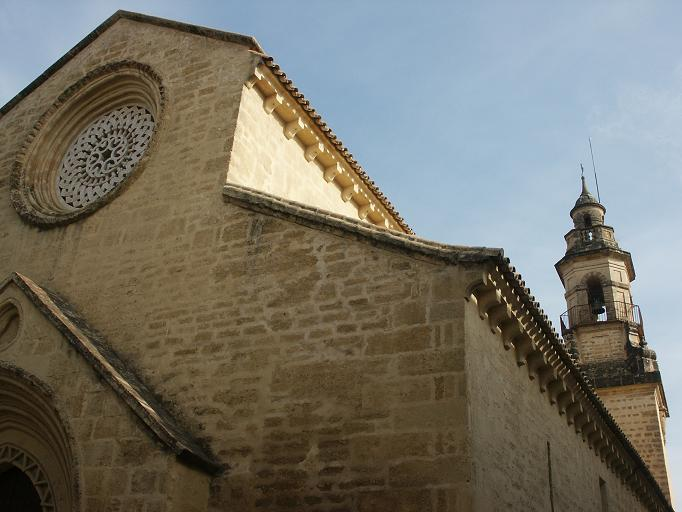
West wall

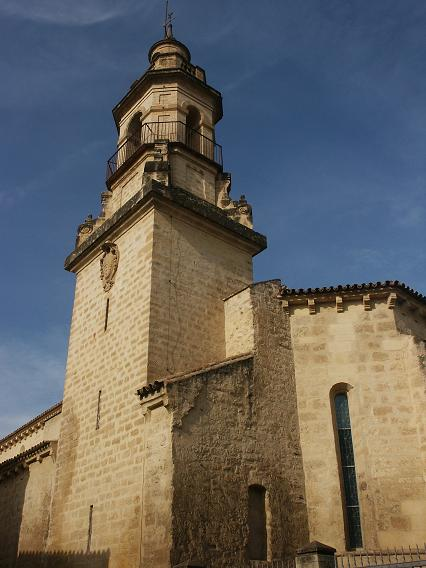
Tower

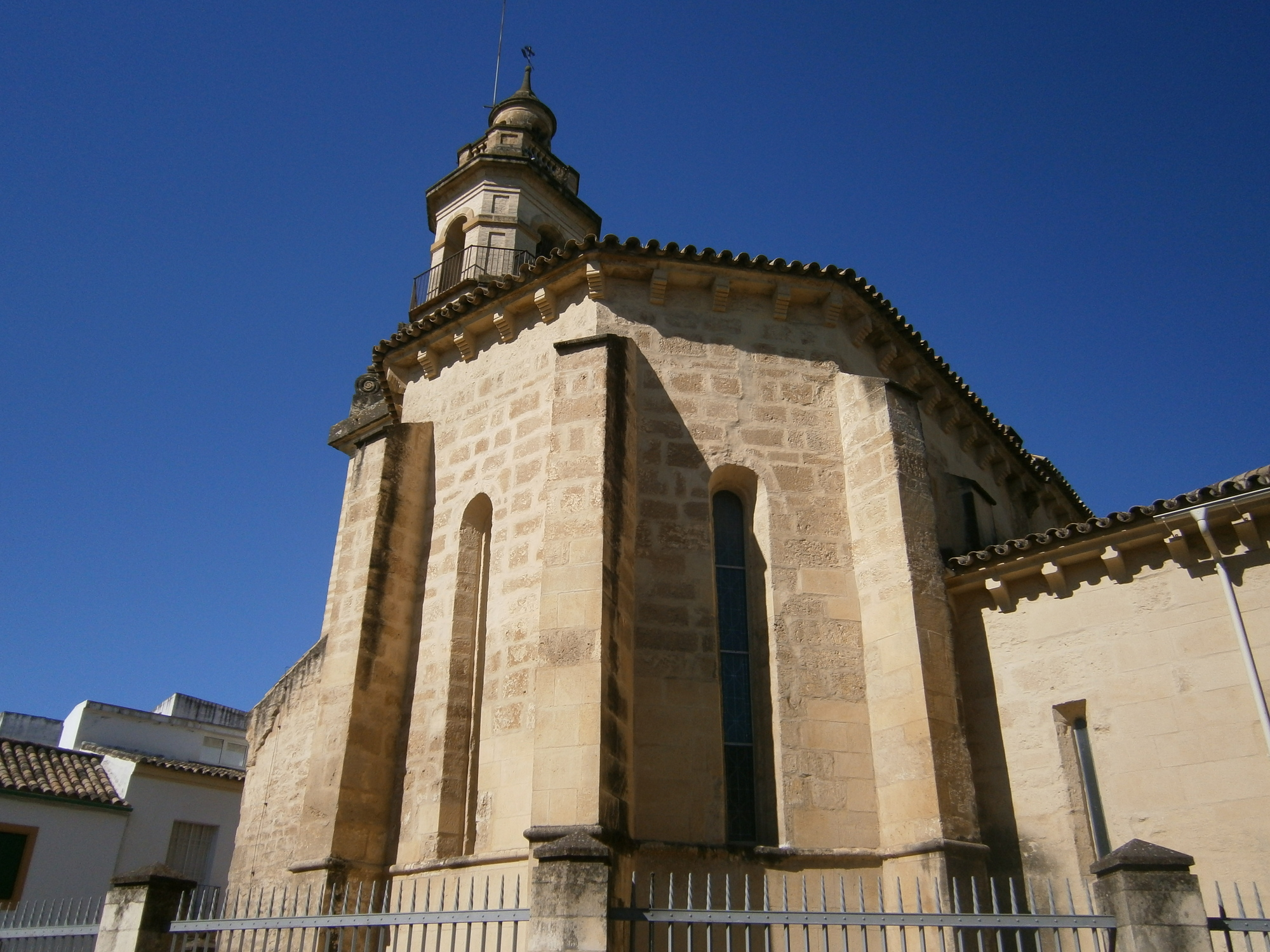
Chancel wall

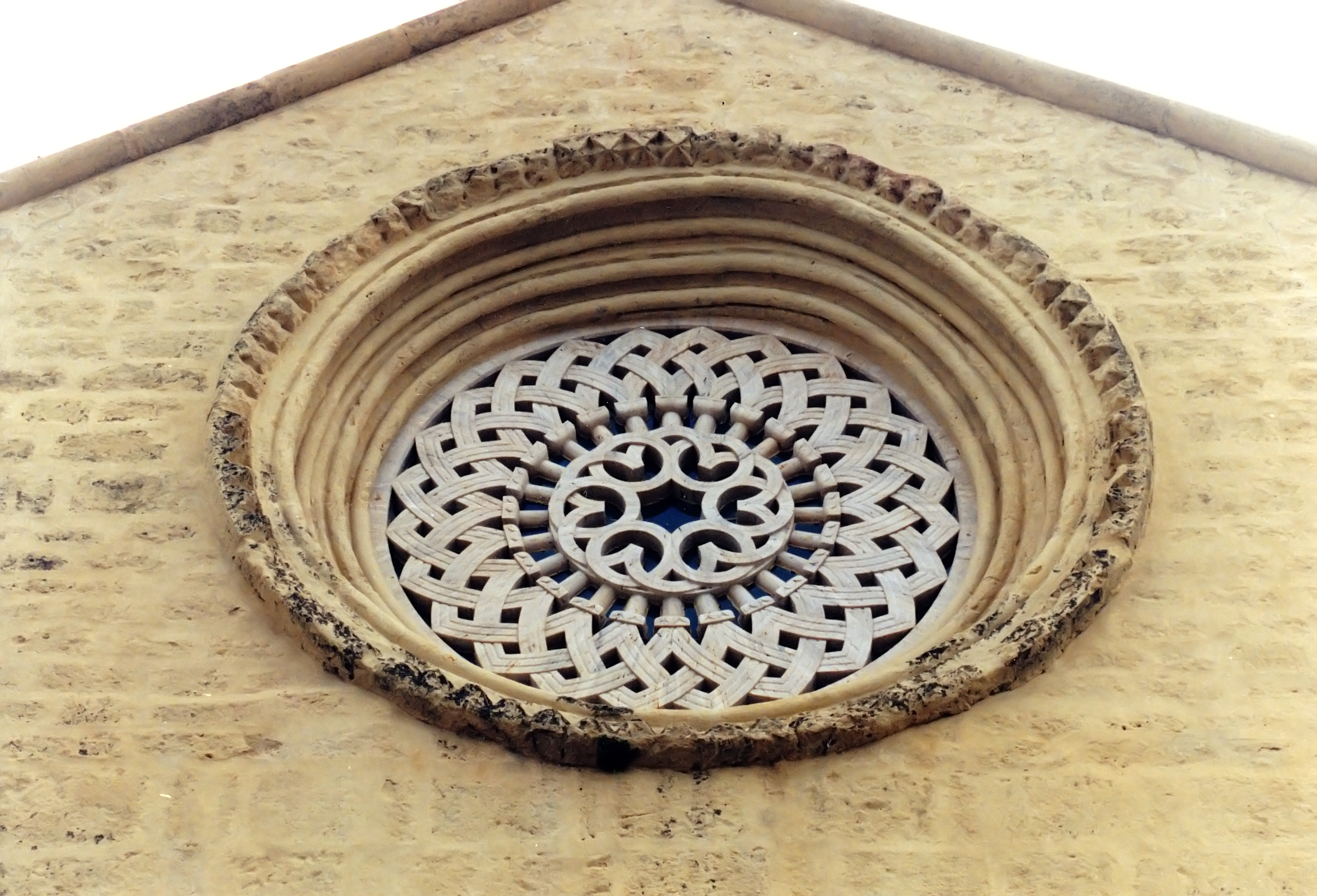
Rose window

== Literature ==
- Casas-Deza, Luis María Ramírez de las (1856). Indicador cordobes, o sea Manual histórico-topográfico de la ciudad de Córdoba. Fausto Garcia Tena. pp. 248–.
