= Majdel Al Koura =

Majdel Al Koura is a church located in Majdel Al Koura, North Lebanon. This is the only church in Lebanon named after Saint Mary Magdalene. The next closest church is the Russian Orthodox church at Mount of Olives, Jerusalem. In the summer of 2013, the village of Majdel received the relics of St. Mary Magdalene.

== Etymology ==
The name "Majdel" comes from the church's patron saint, Mary Magdalene. The village in which the church resides carries the same name. Roughly 75 km from Beirut, Majdel is a small community with an approximate population of 500.

== History ==
The original church was dedicated in 1859. Between 1954 and 1994 it was restored. In 1996, the church was expanded to include two new halls, and gathering spaces. On August 8, 1998, the foundation stone of the new church was laid. In 2008, the new church was launched.
