= Cesi, Serravalle di Chienti =

Cesi
- Frazione
- Location within Italy
- Coordinates: 43°00′36″N 12°54′08″E
- Country: Italy
- Region: Marche
- Provinces: Macerata
- Comune: Serravalle di Chienti
- Elevation: 791 m (2,595 ft)

Population (2001)
  - Total: 60
- Time zone: UTC+1 (CET)
  - Summer (DST): UTC+2 (CEST)

Cesi is a frazione of the comune of Serravalle di Chienti, Marche, central Italy. It is located at 791 m. According to the Istat census of 2001, it has 60 inhabitants.
