= Esanatoglia =

- Comune
- Comune di Esanatoglia
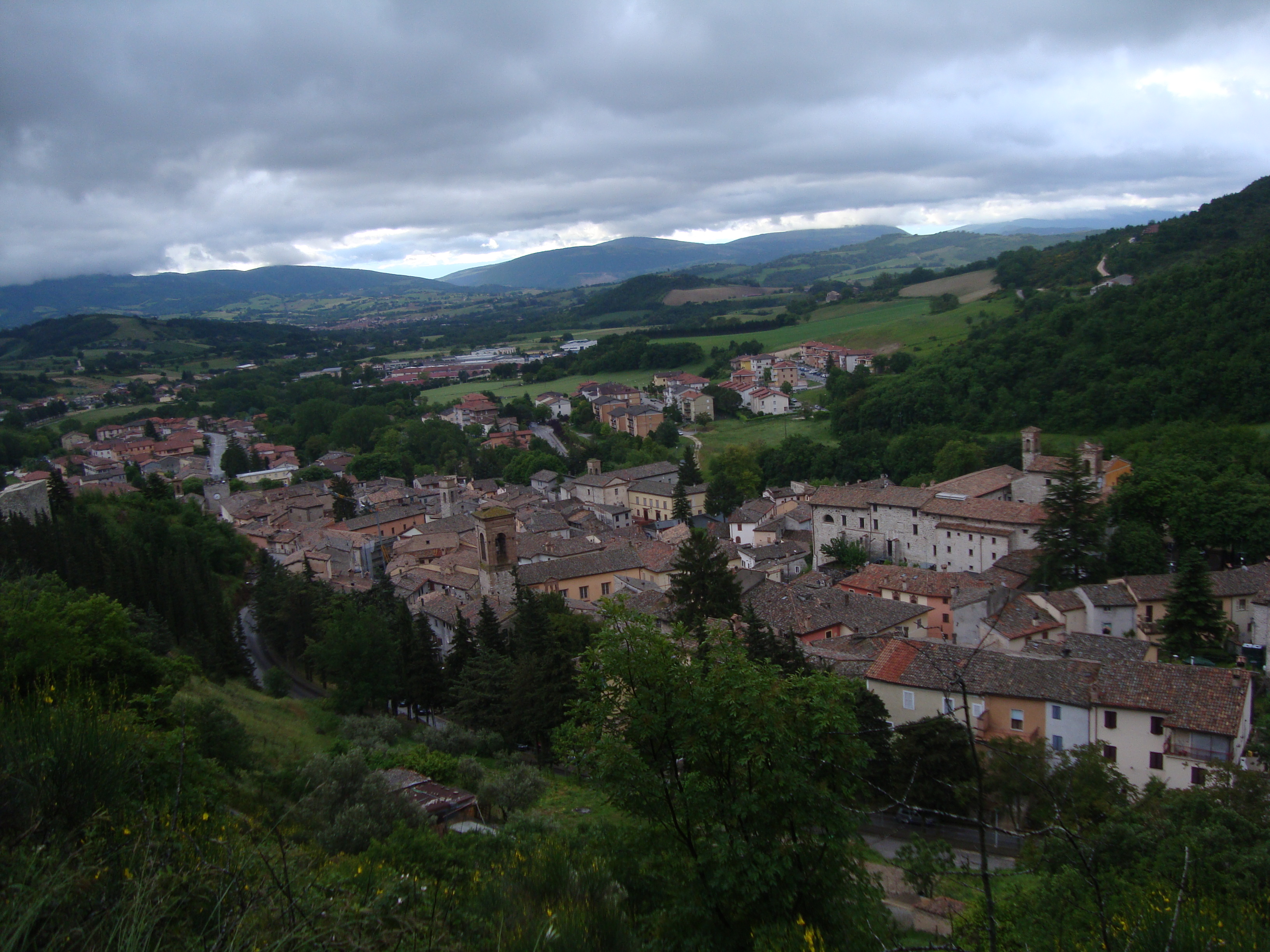

- Coat of arms

- Location within Italy Location within Marche
- Coordinates: 43°15′N 12°57′E
- Country: Italy
- Region: Marche
- Province: Macerata (MC)

Government
  - Mayor: Giorgio Pizzi (since May 2006)

Area
  - Total: 47 km^{2} (18 sq mi)
- Elevation: 495 m (1,624 ft)

Population (2001)
  - Total: 2,099
  - Density: 45/km^{2} (120/sq mi)
- Demonym: Esanatogliesi
- Time zone: UTC+1 (CET)
  - Summer (DST): UTC+2 (CEST)
- Postal code: 62023
- Dialing code: 0737
- Patron saint: Santa Anatolia
- Website: Official website

Esanatoglia is a town and comune in the Marche, Italy. It is one of I Borghi più belli d'Italia ("The most beautiful villages of Italy").

== History ==
According to the legend, Esus, the Celtic God of war, would be the origin of the name of the Esino river, on whose shores a town, Aesa, is presumed to have been founded in Roman times.

The current name Esanatoglia was given in 1862, from a combination between Aesa and Anatolia, replacing the medieval Santa Anatolia, which in turn was derived from Saint Anatolia, a 3rd-century Christian martyr. The first known document referring to Santa Anatolia dates from 1015, concerning the foundation of the monastery of Sant’Angelo by Conte Atto and his wife Berta. The monastery became soon the most important religious establishment in the area.

The city was ruled by the Malcavalca until 1211, when they were succeeded the Ottoni di Matelica. Three years later, and for three hundred years, the da Varano family hold the city. Under the da Varano Santa Anatolia maintained a certain autonomy: the first collection of statutory norms dates from 1324. The citadel remained immune from wars and pillages until 1443, when it was conquered by Francesco I Sforza. The monastery of Sant'Angelo and its library did not escape the devastation.

In 1502 it became part of the Papal States.

== Main sights ==
- Eremo di San Cataldo; formerly part of a hermitage, now a guard tower of medieval origin, located at the top of the mountain facing the city.
- Eremo di San Pietro di Esanatoglia; formerly a hermitage atop a steep mountain side.
- San Martino: 13-14th-century church located in the city's center
- San Sebastiano
- Santa Maria Maddalena: baroque church
- Fountain of San Martino (possibly from the 12th century). In 1534 it was re-built by order of Cardinal Alessandro Farnese
- Sant'Andrea Gate

== Notable Person ==
- Carlo Milanuzzi, composer of the early Baroque era
