= Santa Maria Assunta, Sarnano =

Roman Catholic collegiate church in Sarnano, Italy

Santa Maria Assunta is a Roman Catholic collegiate church located in the Piazza Alta of the town of Sarnano, province of Macerata, region of Marche, Italy.

== History ==
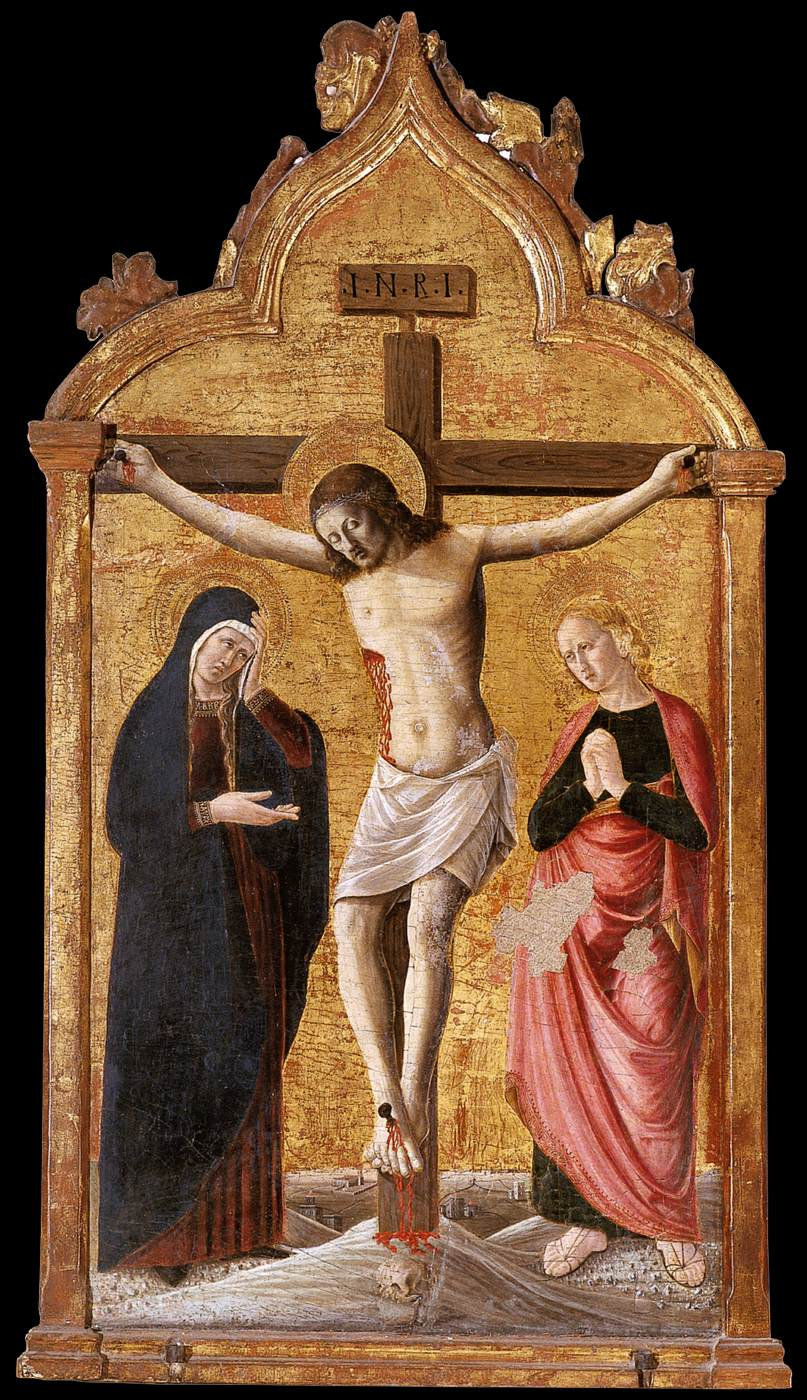
Crucifixion by Giovanni Angelo D'Antonio

The brick church was erected in the 13th century; the bell-tower, rising near the apse, dates from the 14th century. The façade has two mullioned windows and a sculpted stone portal, with a bas-relief in the lunette depicting the Assumption of the Madonna.

The interior houses painting depicting a Madonna and Child with Saints by Antonio and Giangentile di Lorenzo, a 15th-century Madonna and Child with Angels by Lorenzo D’Alessandro (father of Antonio and Giangentile), and a Holy Trinity (1530) painted by Paolo Bontulli from Percanestro di Serravalle. It also houses a wooden processional standard depicting the Annunciation and Crucifixion by Giovanni Angelo d'Antonio and a Madonna della Misericordia (1494) by Pietro Alemanno, as well as panels from a polyptych depicting Saints by Niccolò Alunno and 15th-century wooden statues for a presepio or nativity scene by unknown Tyrolese artisans. The crypt also has frescoed dated 1494 by Pietro Alemanno.
