= San Filippo, San Severino Marche =

Church in San Severino Marche, Italy

Coordinates: 43°13′43″N 13°10′37″E

San Filippo is a Baroque style, Roman Catholic church located on Via Massarelli in central San Severino Marche, region of Marche, Italy.

== History ==
The church was built in 1620 by Filippini priests from the Sanctuary della Madonna dei Lumi. It was built at the site of an ancient Benedictine order church of San Benedetto. In 1666, the church acquired an octagonal oratory adjacent to this church. The convent was suppressed by the Napoleonic government, and in 1862 was given to the city.

The church, reflecting the earlier medieval structure, has a single nave. The altars were created along the nave. The first altar on the right has an altarpiece with the Immaculate Conception with Saints Cajetan and Tecla (1714) by Biagio Puccini nel 1714. The main altar was designed by Venanzio Bigioli. The ceiling of the presbytery was decorated by Paolo Marini. The walls have depictions of the Life of St Phillip (1922-1923) by Mario Adami and Nicola Angelelli. The first altar on the left depicts a San Carlo Borromeo and Saints by Girolamo Pesci, while the second altarpiece depicts San Francesco Saverio Dying by Paolo Borsetti.
