= San Severino Cathedral =

Church in San Severino Marche, Italy

Coordinates: 43.2289°N 13.1755°E

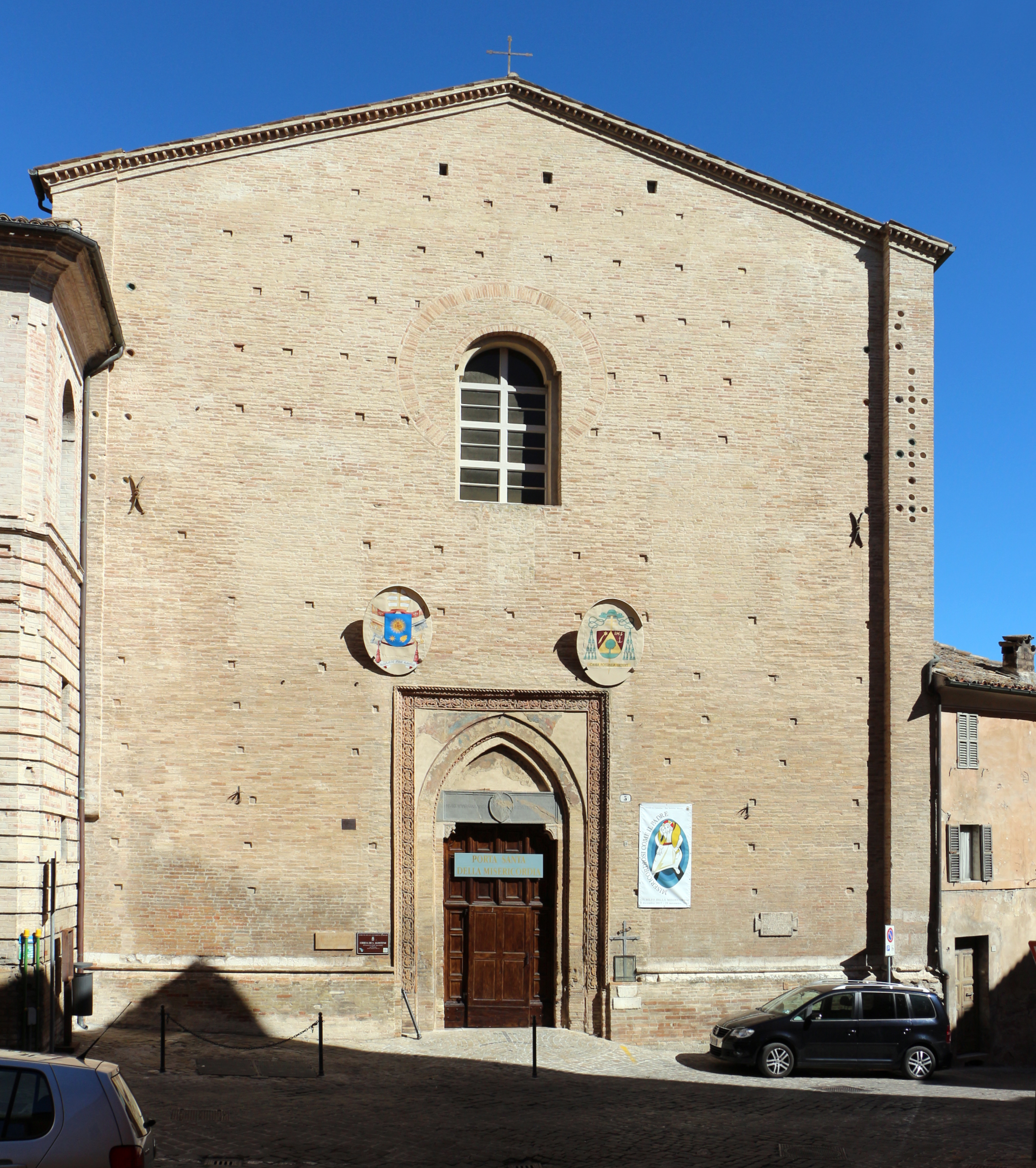
Façade.

San Severino Cathedral (Italian: Duomo di San Severino, Concattedrale di Sant’Agostino), also known locally as the New Cathedral (Duomo nuovo), is a 17th-century Neo-classical Roman Catholic church dedicated to Saint Augustine, located on the Piazza del Duomo in San Severino Marche, region of Marche, Italy. In 1827 it became the cathedral of the Diocese of San Severino. Since 1986 it has been a co-cathedral of the Archdiocese of Camerino-San Severino Marche.

== History ==
A church on the site was built in the 13th century by the Augustinians in the place of an earlier one dedicated to Saint Mary Magdalene. In 1488 Liberato Bartelli was made prior of the church in his home town of San Severino. To commemorate the occasion, he commissioned an oil painting, the Madonna of Peace from Pinturicchio, which he donated to the church. It is now in the Pinacoteca Civica Padre Pietro Tacchi Venturi in San Severino.

Rebuilt over the centuries, in 1827 it underwent a major reconstruction to become a cathedral. It retains a 15th-century facade. It contains remnants of frescoes by Lorenzo d'Alessandro.
