= Sant'Eustachio (disambiguation) =

Sant'Eustachio is a Roman Catholic titular church and minor basilica in Rome.

Sant'Eustachio may also refer to:

- Sant'Eustachio (rione of Rome), a rione of Rome
- Sant'Eustachio in Domora, San Severino Marche, a medieval rock-carved chapel in the Valle dei Grilli, Marche, Italy
