= Castello Aliforni =

Castle in Italy

Coordinates: 43.29882°N 13.1582°E

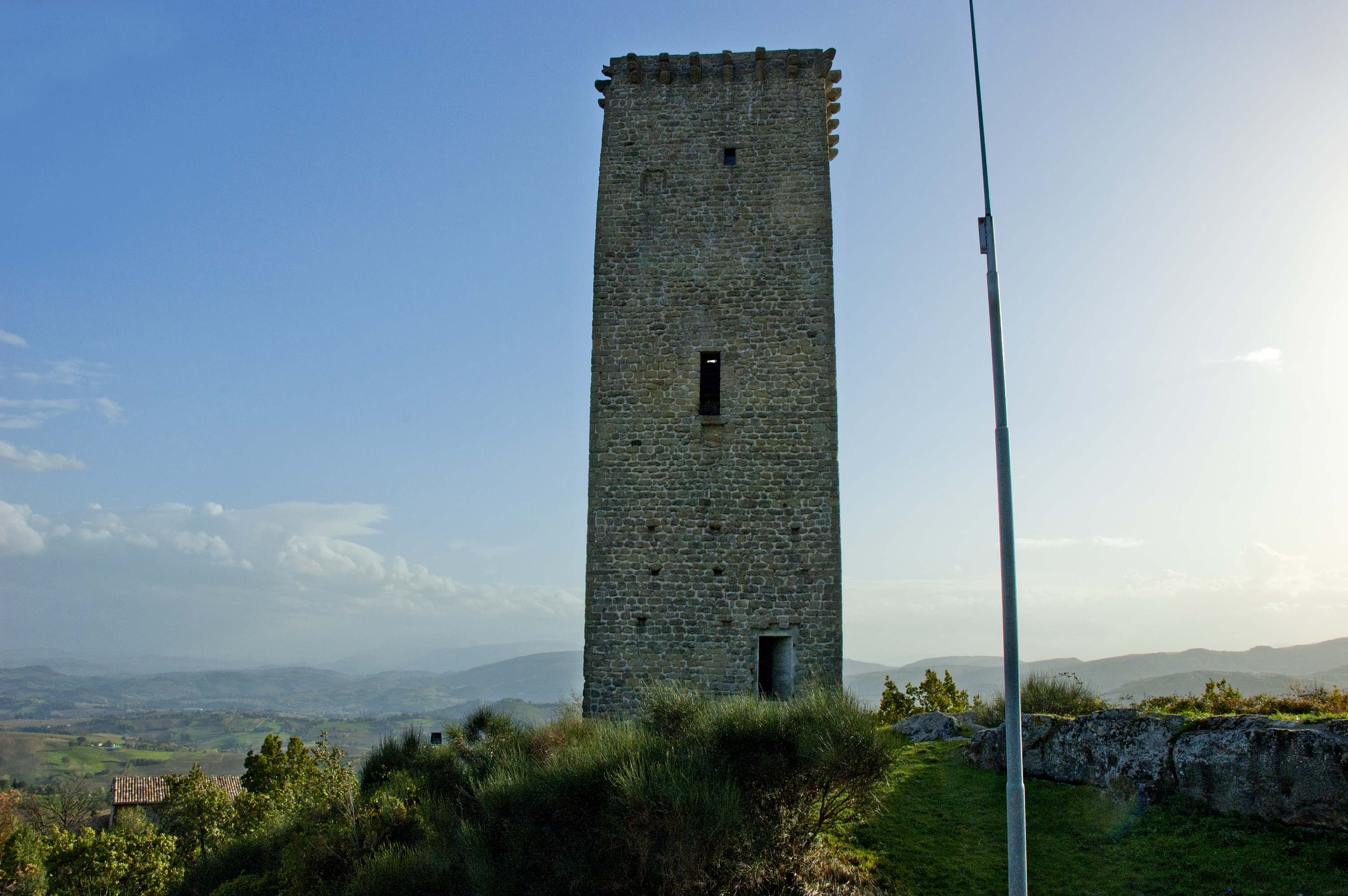
Castle's tower

Castello Aliforni is a 13th-century castle that now forms part of the walls of San Severino Marche, in the region of Marche, Italy. It is located in the little village of Aliforni.

== History ==
The castle was sold in 1257 to the town of San Severino by Guglielmo, Bishop of Camerino. It is located near the church of Santa Maria Annunziata. The church was rebuilt in the 19th century by Irenaeus Aleandri and houses a fresco attributed to Lorenzo Salimbeni. Around the tower of the castle are the ruins of the walls that surrounded the medieval city.
