= Praefectura =

Praefectura (Latin, 'Prefecture') may refer to:

- Praefectura (Roman settlement), a type of administrative settlement in the Roman Republic and early Roman Empire
- Praetorian prefecture, the largest administrative division of the late Roman Empire
