= Giangentile di Lorenzo =

Italian painter

Giangentile di Lorenzo (active 16th century) was an Italian painter. Along with his two brothers, Antonio and Sanseverino, he learned his craft initially from his father the painter Lorenzo d'Alessandro of Sanseverino. In the town of Sanseverino, Ricci claims they likely came in contact with Pinturicchio. Antonio and Giangentile painted a Madonna and St Martin (1560) for the San Severino Cathedral; they also painted for the church of Santa Maria Assunta, Sarnano. Giangentile also painted a Madonna and Child for the church of the Madonna dei Lumi, San Severino Marche. He is said to have died on 19 December 1576.
