= Madonna of Peace =

Madonna of Peace (Italian: Madonna della Pace) may refer to:

- Madonna of Peace (Pinturicchio), painting by Pinturicchio now in San Severino Marche, province of Macerata
- Madonna della Pace Shrine, a shrine in Albisola Superiore, province of Savona
