= Hermitage of Soffiano =

Church in Sarnano, Italy

Coordinates: 43°01′49″N 13°14′42″E

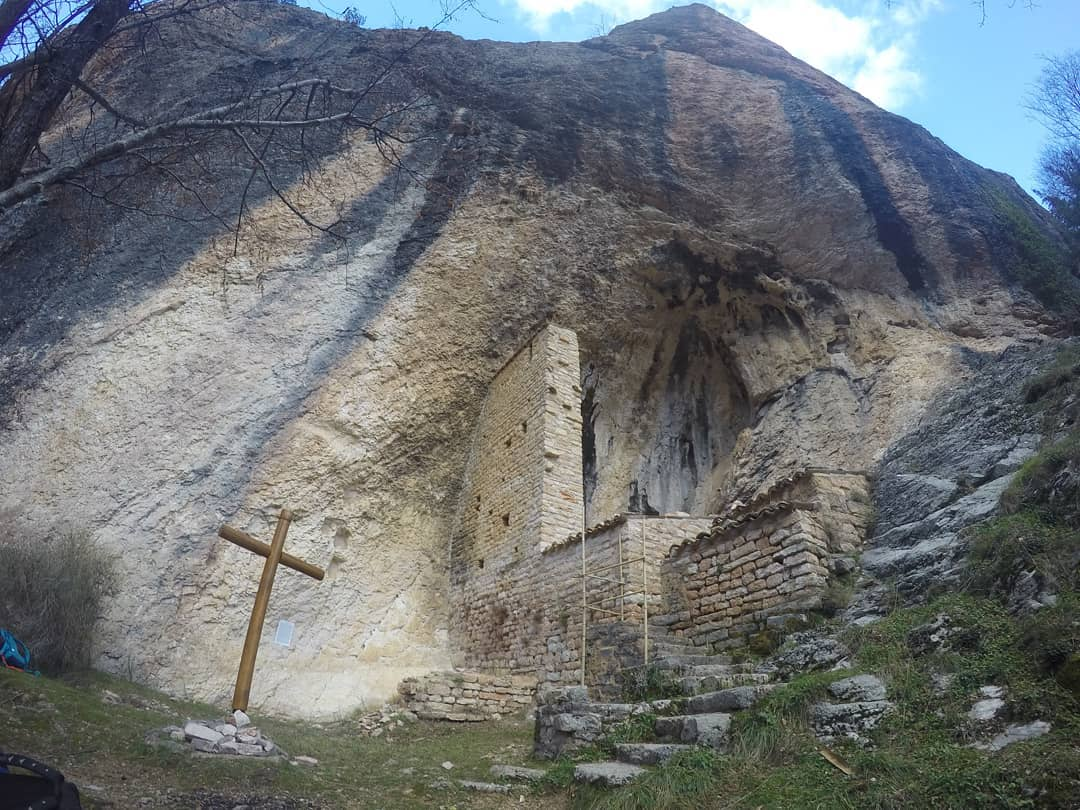

The Hermitage of Soffiano (Italian: Eremo di Soffiano) consists of a few rough structures, mainly a wall, underneath a rockface in the mountains outside of Sarnano, province of Macerata, Marche, Italy.

== History ==
Documentation recalls the donation of land to a hermit monk in 1101, for him and his companions to erect a chapel and live in isolation. The site has since been linked to St Francis of Assisi of his companions, the blessed Umile and Liberato, which tradition holds, either lived and/or died at this site. Some speculate the biography of Liberato da Loro (Anonimo di Soffiano), Umile and Pacifico of Actus beati Francisci et sociorum eius/I Fioretti di San Francesco was written here. The primitive structures present in 2016 were built this century; the hermitage likely included wooden structures making rooms. Excavations at the site uncovered burials.
