= San Giuseppe, Sanseverino Marche =

Church building in San Severino Marche, Italy

Coordinates: 43°13′45″N 13°10′39″E

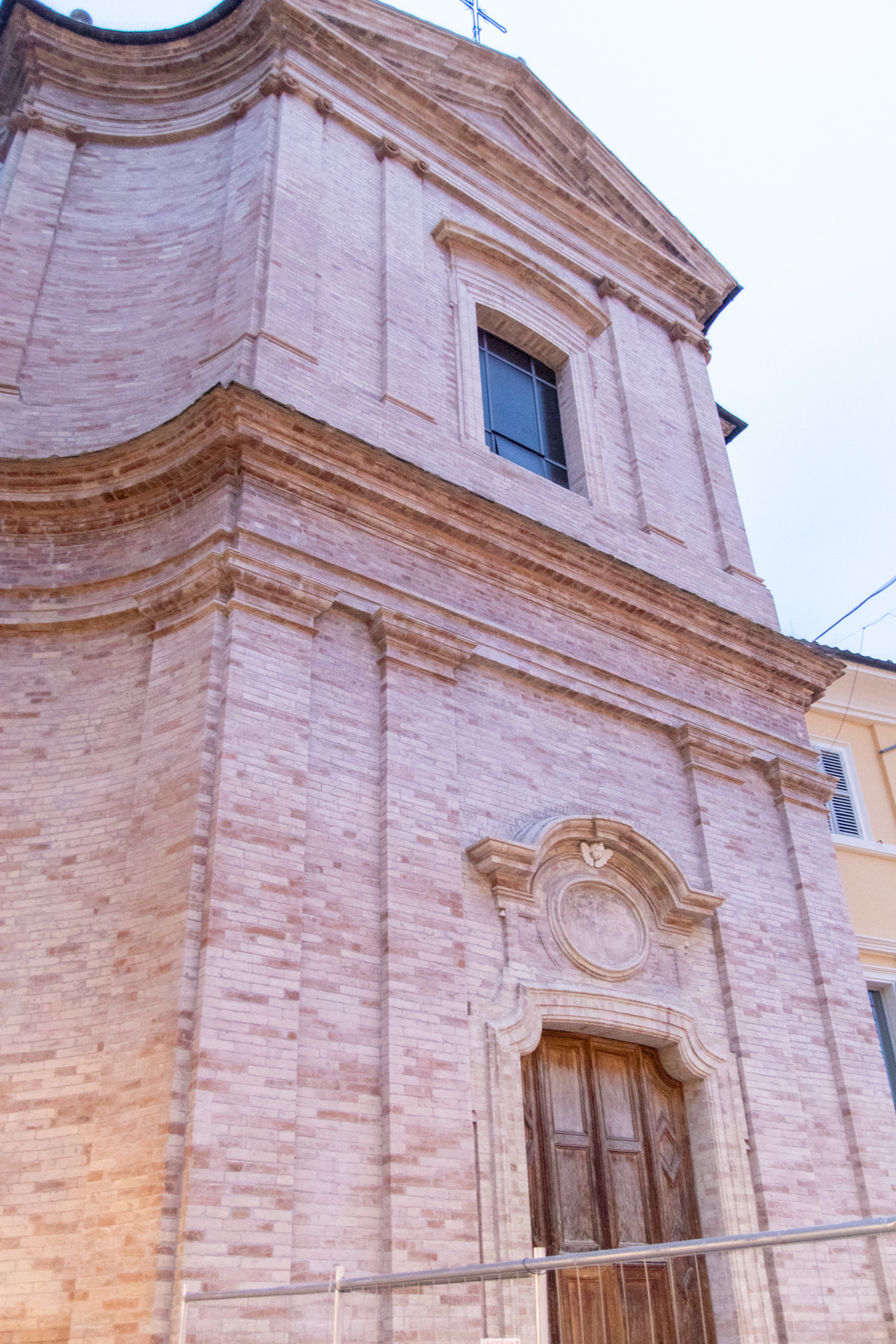

San Giuseppe or St Joseph is a 17th-century, late-Baroque-style, Roman Catholic church, located in Piazza del Popolo in San Severino Marche, region of Marche, Italy.

== History ==
The church was built in 1628 under the patronage of the Tinti family, and renovated in 1768 by Vincenzo Tinti utilizing the architect Carlo Maggi.
