= Paolo Marini =

Italian painter

Paolo Marini (17th century) was an Italian painter. He was born in San Severino. He is noted as a painter in the apse of the church of San Filippo, San Severino Marche. He also painted for the church of Santa Maria del Glorioso near San Severino.
