= San Lorenzo in Doliolo, San Severino Marche =

Monastery in San Severino Marche, Italy

The Abbey of San Lorenzo in Doliolo is a former Benedictine Order medieval monastery in San Severino Marche, region of Marche, Italy.

== History ==
The abbey was initially founded in the 8th or 9th centuries, and stood outside the walls of the castle of San Severino. It was further enlarged in the 11th and 12th centuries, using the original crypt. The dedication to St Lawrence in Doliolo derives from the tradition of the distribution by the monks of doliola, a local container.

The crypt was rediscovered in the 19th century after being sealed in 1526 during the construction of a chapel of St Filomena above. This led to the discover of 14th-century frescoes by Lorenzo and Jacopo Salimbeni.

The church has a nave arranged from east to west, with an entrance through a pointed Romanesque portal at the base of the 14th-century belltower. The bell-tower has a stone base, and made of brick superiorly with mullioned windows.
