= San Severino Marche =

- Comune
- Comune di San Severino Marche
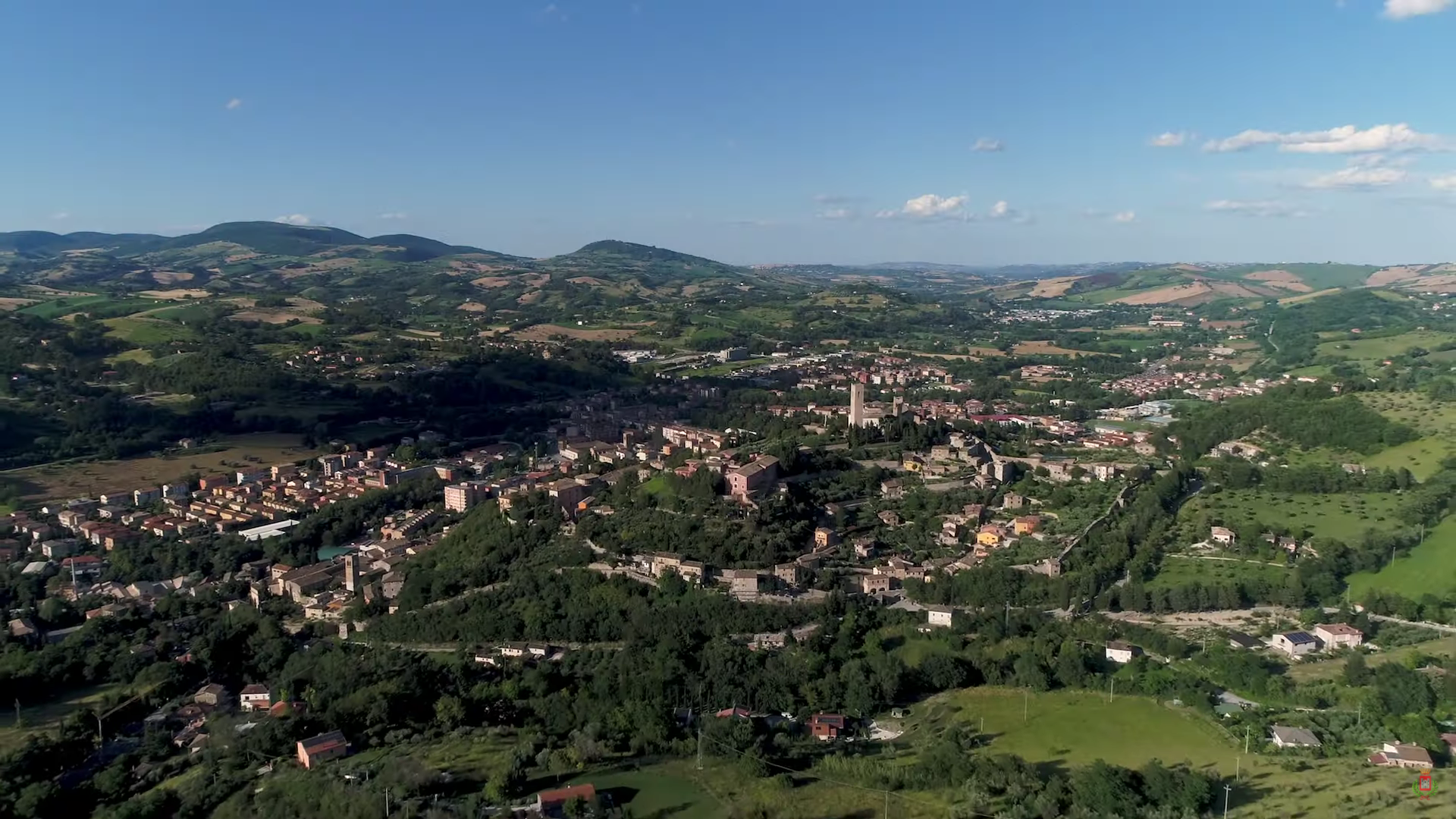

- Coat of arms

- San Severino Marche within the province of Macerata.

- Location within Italy Location within Marche
- Coordinates: 43°14′N 13°11′E
- Country: Italy
- Region: Marche
- Province: Macerata (MC)
- Frazioni: Agello, Aliforni, Biagi, Cagnore, Carpignano, Case Bruciate, Le Casette, Castel San pietro, Cesolo, Chigiano, Colleluce, Collicelli, Colotto, Corsciano, Cusiano, Elcito, Gagliannuovo, Gaglianvecchio, Granali, Isola, Marciano, Orpiano, Palazzata, Parolito, Portolo, Pitino, Rocchetta, San Mauro, Sant'Elena, Serralta, Serripola, Serrone, Stigliano, Taccoli, Ugliano, Villanova

Government
  - Mayor: Rosa Piermattei (since 7 June 2016)

Area
  - Total: 193.8 km^{2} (74.8 sq mi)
- Elevation: 236 m (774 ft)

Population (1 October 2012)
  - Total: 12,896
  - Density: 66.54/km^{2} (172.3/sq mi)
- Demonym(s): Settempedani; Sanseverinati
- Time zone: UTC+1 (CET)
  - Summer (DST): UTC+2 (CEST)
- Postal code: 62027
- Dialing code: 0733
- Patron saint: Severinus of Septempeda
- Saint day: 8 June
- Website: Official website

San Severino Marche is a comune (municipality) in the Province of Macerata in the Italian region Marche, located about 50 kilometres (31 mi) southwest of Ancona and about 25 kilometres (16 mi) southwest of Macerata.

== History ==
=== From prehistory to Roman age ===
The oldest remains of human presence in San Severino date back to the Palaeolithic and their provenance is from the area of Stigliano. But there are other remains, found in many localities of the municipality, documenting several settlements in the area in different ages. In the Serralta territory, 10 kilometres (6 mi) north of San Severino, characteristic remains from the Middle Palaeolithic and High Palaeolithic have been found whereas human presence in Pitino, located 4 kilometres (2.5 mi) north-east of the town, goes back to the Middle Mousterian Palaeolithic. Metallic remains with a symbolic function were found in many areas of the municipal territory, documenting the uninterrupted settlement and the existence of a complex social hierarchy of the whole prehistoric era.

The first significant civilization can be traced back to the Piceni, concentrated in the vicinity of Pitino. Excavations since 1932 have brought to light a residential area on top of the hill and three necropolis in the vicinity, all dating back to a period between the 7th and 5th century BC. Remains of funerary sets, with presents from other areas, highlight the high social levels of the populations living in the area.

At the foot of the Monte Nero there was a sacred temple, a unique one in the region, devoted to the cult of the goddess Feronia, divinity of Sabine origin to which the Liberti were consecrated. This suggests that the town of Septempeda (ancient name of uncertain origins of San Severino in the Roman age) had a pre-Roman origin. During the period of the persecutions of the Christians, the temple of Feronia was used as a catacomb and place for prayers.

From the 3rd century BC, with the Roman conquest of the Piceno area in 268 BC, Septempeda became one of the first colonies of the Roman empire, as proven by many tombstones with family names of Roman soldiers, such as the gentes Baebia, Calpurnia and Flavia. Between the 3rd and 2nd centuries BC. the conciliabulum and the center of praefectura were built. Together with other inscriptions, this demonstrates that the town of Septempeda grew as a prefecture and was raised to the rank of Roman municipality with a strategic role in controlling the trade through an important way connecting the Adriatic Sea to Rome.

Of the walls of the city of Septempeda, located in locality “La Pieve”, eastern of the present-day town, are still to be seen the foundations, almost complete, the remains of the eastern and south-western doors and a thermal-like building, probably the city forum, together with other remains out of the town wall.

=== Middle Ages ===
The Roman municipality of Septempeda gradually fell into ruin in early Middle Ages, surviving until the late Middle Ages. Its territory was elevated to Gastaldato, a civil and military Lombard jurisdiction, testifying that the town was still important at that time. This confutes the legend of the destruction inflicted by Totila in 545 during the Gothic Wars.

Incursions of both Germanic and Byzantine troops by the 6th century, forced the inhabitants to find shelter in near high grounds, and in particular on Monte Nero (the hill that overlooks the present day town) where existed perhaps since Roman ages, a military organization called “Castrum reale”. The Roman city, or its remains, continued to be inhabited, especially during peaceful periods, due to its ease of communication through Roman roads, keeping the name of Septempeda.

According to tradition, St. Severinus, from whom the city takes its present name, was consecrated as a Bishop by Pope Vigilius in 540. Severinus died in 545, the same year of the passage of the Goths towards Rome.

The remains of the saint were hidden in the Cathedral of St. Maria in Septempeda to protect them from looting; found in 590 during the restoration of the cathedral, they were carried to Monte Nero.

With Charlemagne's conquest of northern Italy in 773, San Severino swore loyalty to Pope Adrian I, following the entire region of Pentapolis. The first reliable document concerning the existence of this new centre dates back to 944, year of foundation of a larger church to accommodate the faithful and the relics of Saint Severino that was placed in the hamlet of the "Castellum Severinum Sanctum". Documents from the 11th and 12th centuries show that the Castle of San Severino was part of the diocese and the Camerino March before being transferred in 1119 to the Marquis Werner II of Spoleto, who had come from Germany to fight for the Pope against the Normans. The dynasty of Werner rule the Marche and San Severino's territories until about 1170, when the establishment of the Commune of San Severino can be traced back. The first consuls of the commune were Petrino and Offroduccio, appointed by Frederick Barbarossa in 1177.

The initial office of the consuls was later replaced with the podestà, an official coming from a different city. San Severino remained Ghibellin, swearing loyalty to Manfred of Hohenstaufen, supporting the rebellions of other cities against the Pope.

At the beginning of the 14th century San Severino managed to increase its domains with other castles, such as Pitino, Gagliole, Carpignano, Aliforni, Frontale and Isola, reaching the current territorial extension. After the death of Manfred (1266), the Guelphs got the upper hand and San Severino came under the control of the Pope.

The 14th century is characterized by the rule of Smeducci, a local family of mercenary captains who maintained their hegemony on the city almost continuously, until they were banished in 1426 by the pope. By nature allied to the Guelphs, but more often as opportunists, the Smeducci lords were often hated by their subjects, who rebelled against them in more than one circumstance. However the Smeduccis were also patron of the arts during a period which witnessed the best artistic achievements in San Severino, with Lorenzo and Jacopo Salimbeni and Lorenzo d'Alessandro as the most creative exponents. Jacopo served as a Councillor of the Commune in San Severino.

During the rule of the Smeducci lords, San Severino lived also its period of maximum commercial, industrial and social development. Many inhabitants had come down from Monte Nero increasing the population of the existing small village, setting up paper mills and silk, wool and clothes factories, goods exported all over the Marche. New public buildings, churches and bell towers were built.

Francesco Sforza, a condottiero owning several lands in the Marche, settled down in San Severino between 1443 and 1445, welcomed by the inhabitants who saw in him enough power to resist both the absolutisms of the local lords, and the tyranny of the Papal vicars. After having reconquered twice the Marca territory, Sforza decided to abandon his possessions to concentrate his efforts on the fight against the Visconti of Milan.

The descendants of the Smeducci – who were back in favour with the Church – took advantage of the Sforza's absence to run the last attempt to re-conquer the state of San Severino. This ended up with the subjugation of San Severino by the army of Papal commander Giovanni Vitelleschi, and the subsequent imprisonment of Smeduccio Smeducci in Castel Sant'Angelo. Sanseverino became part of the Papal States by a treaty signed at Tolentino in 1445.

=== Renaissance and contemporary age ===
In 1502 the town had to fight to defend itself from the invasion and devastation operated by Giovanni Maria da Varano, escaped from Cesare Borgia’s slaughter.

In 1523 a plague decimated the population of S. Severino and all its commercial and cultural activities. At that time the town was troubled by the conflicts between two nobles families Caccialupi and Gentili, which divided the people into two factions and required a direct intervention of Pope Paul III that was ineffective. Only in 1564 the two parties came to a peace agreement, as signed in the cathedral of San Severino at Castle, in front of the governor of the March.

In those years the town centre progressively moved almost entirely from the hill to the valley, around the old market square; between the half of the 18th century and the beginning of the 19th century, also the town hall, the Bishop's palace and the Cathedral, were abandoned to leave an almost isolated town district.

This long period of economic and cultural decline was marked by few important events. In 1604 Pope Clement VIII assigned his brother Cardinal Giovanni Aldobrandini a governmental mandate for San Severino. In 1607 the administration of San Severino became independent from the Holy Court of Macerata.

In 1795 Pope Pius VI granted the opening of a mint which during some years minted coins that are extremely rare today.

During the first short Napoleonic campaign the general Berthier imposed the Roman Republic and the establishment of a municipality which remained in charge until June 1799. After the second French invasion (1808–1813), the whole “Marca” was united to the Kingdom of Italy, San Severino becoming the capital of the Canton Department of Musone. After the Napoleonic era San Severino returned under the Holy See and in 1816 it was declared Governor District of San Ginesio, Sarnano and Tolentino by Pope Pius VII.

In 1831 and 1849 a lot of its inhabitants participated in the rebellions; this culminated with the arrival of Piedmontese troops in 1860, ceasing the Papal rule in San Severino forever. Like other Italian towns, San Severino chose the annexation to the Kingdom of Italy, sharing the same fate and history of other Italian cities.

== Monuments and sites of interest ==
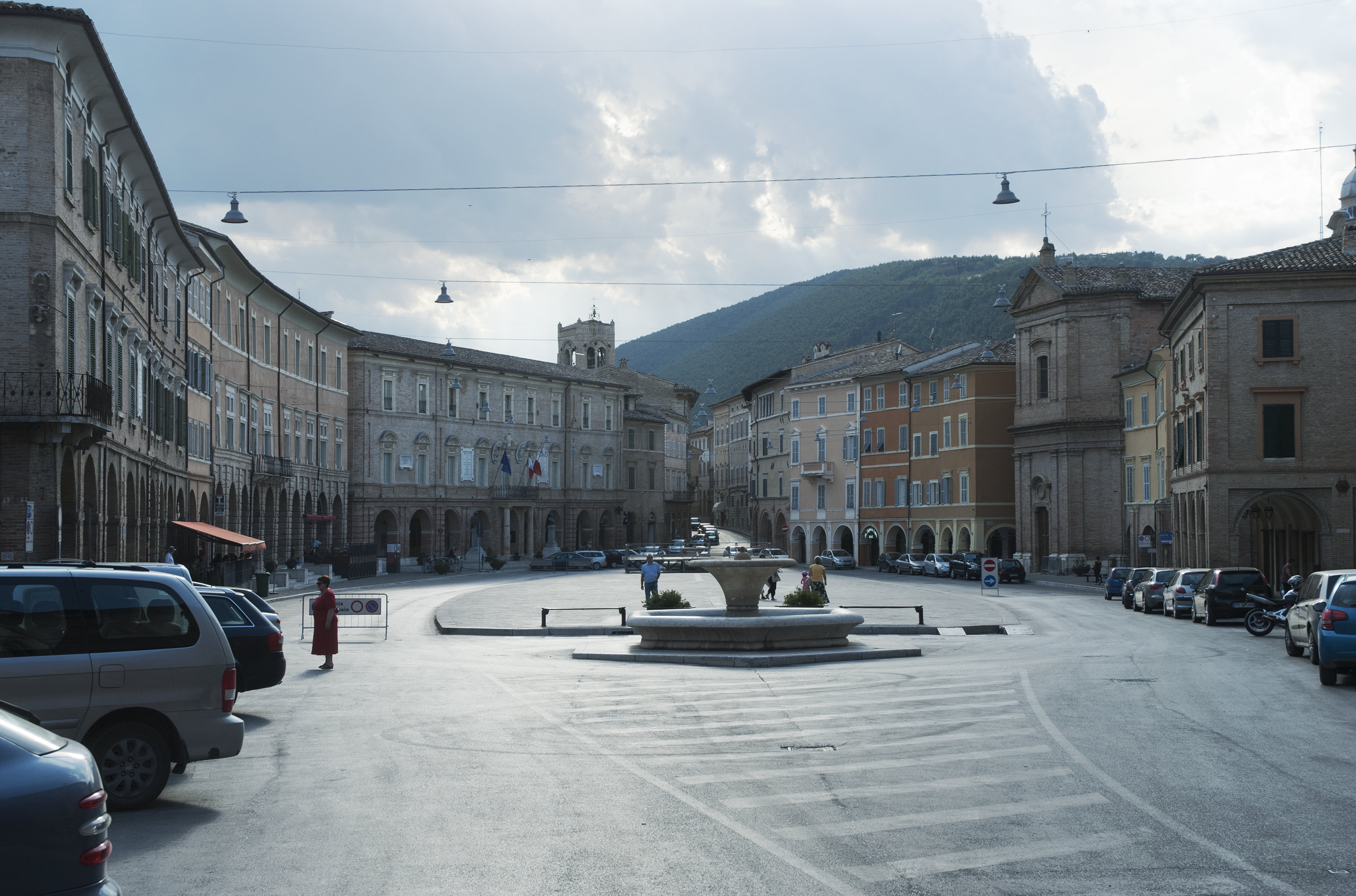
Piazza del Popolo, the main square in San Severino Marche

=== Religious architecture and sites ===
- Santa Maria del Glorioso: church on the road for Cingoli, housing numerous paintings
- San Lorenzo in Doliolo Basilica: 13th century church, which according to tradition, was originally built in the 2nd century over a temple of Feronia. The crypt dates to the 6th century and has numerous fragments of frescoes
- Sanctuary of the Madonna dei Lumi
- San Severino Cathedral
- Chiesa della Maestà
- Santa Maria delle Grazie and the sanctuary of San Pacifico
- San Giuseppe – Baroque church
- San Domenico – 13th century church with a 17th-century interior. The bell tower has a 14th-century fresco cycle of Stories of St Catherine.
- Sant'Eustachio in Domora - abandoned medieval rock carved chapel
- Santa Maria di Cesello
- Santa Maria di Valdiola, Chigiano

=== Secular architecture and sites ===
- Fortified square (13th century) of Piazza del Popolo
- Remains of the medieval city (called "Castello"), with the communal tower (Smeducci Tower), two gates and the ancient cathedral (10th century) with its bell tower
- Archaeological remains of Septempeda (baths, remains of gates and walls)
- Archaeological Museum Giuseppe Moretti.
- Castello Aliforni
- Pinacoteca Civica Padre Pietro Tacchi Venturi

== Twin towns ==
- Ferentino, Italy
- Balmaseda, Spain

== Notable people ==
- Lorenzo Salimbeni (1374 – c. 1418), painter
- Jacopo Salimbeni (c. 1370/80 – after 1426), painter
- Giacomo Bonaventura (1989–present), soccer player
- Lodovico Lazzarelli (1447–1500), philosopher, courtier, poet, and magician
- Eustachio Divini (1610–1685), manufacturer of optical instruments
- Ines Donati (1900–1924), fascist political activist
- Gualberto Piangatelli (1921–2001), historian and archeologist
- Edoardo Menichelli (1939–present), Cardinal and Bishop of Ancona-Osimo
- Fabrizio Castori (1954–present), soccer coach
- Lorenzo Baldassarri (1996–present), Grand Prix motorcycle racer
- Alessandro Paparoni (1981–present), volleyball player
- Daniel Mancinelli (1988–present), race car driver
- Umberto Rispoli (1988-present), jockey
- Giulio Pellizzari (2003-present), professional cyclist
