= Abbey of San Biagio, Piobbico =

Former Roman Catholic monastery in Marche, Italy

Coordinates: 43.00781°N 13.26281°E

The Abbey of San Biagio was a former Roman Catholic monastery located in a rural site in the village of Piobbico, within the limits of the commune of Sarnano, in the province of Macerata, region of Marche, Italy. Of the abbey, only the church, dedicated to St Blaise, and a small monastic apartment remain.

== History ==
Originally the site had a chapel dedicated to Santa Maria inter rivoira (or between the rivers), since it was located between the rivers Tenna and Tennacola. A Benedictine abbey was founded in 1030, and consecrated in 1059. The dedication to St Blaise did not arise till the 15th century.

The first two centuries of the abbey were prosperous, but it then fell into decline till it was abandoned by the mid-13th century.

The Romanesque-style abbey church, built with local stone, has remained as a local oratory dedicated to the Virgin. It has a narrow nave leading to a flat apse wall with two narrow windows. The façade has a single high oculus with a rounded portal. The portal has an inscription from 1117, noting some repairs which appear to have reduced the size of the church. The apse and nave walls have fresco remnants from the 15th century, attributed respectively to Giovanni di Corraduccio and Matteo da Gualdo. The crypt remains relatively intact, supported by sturdy simple columns.
