= Oratory of St John the Baptist, Urbino =

14th-century small chapel in Urbino, Italy

Coordinates: 43.7256°N 12.6345°E

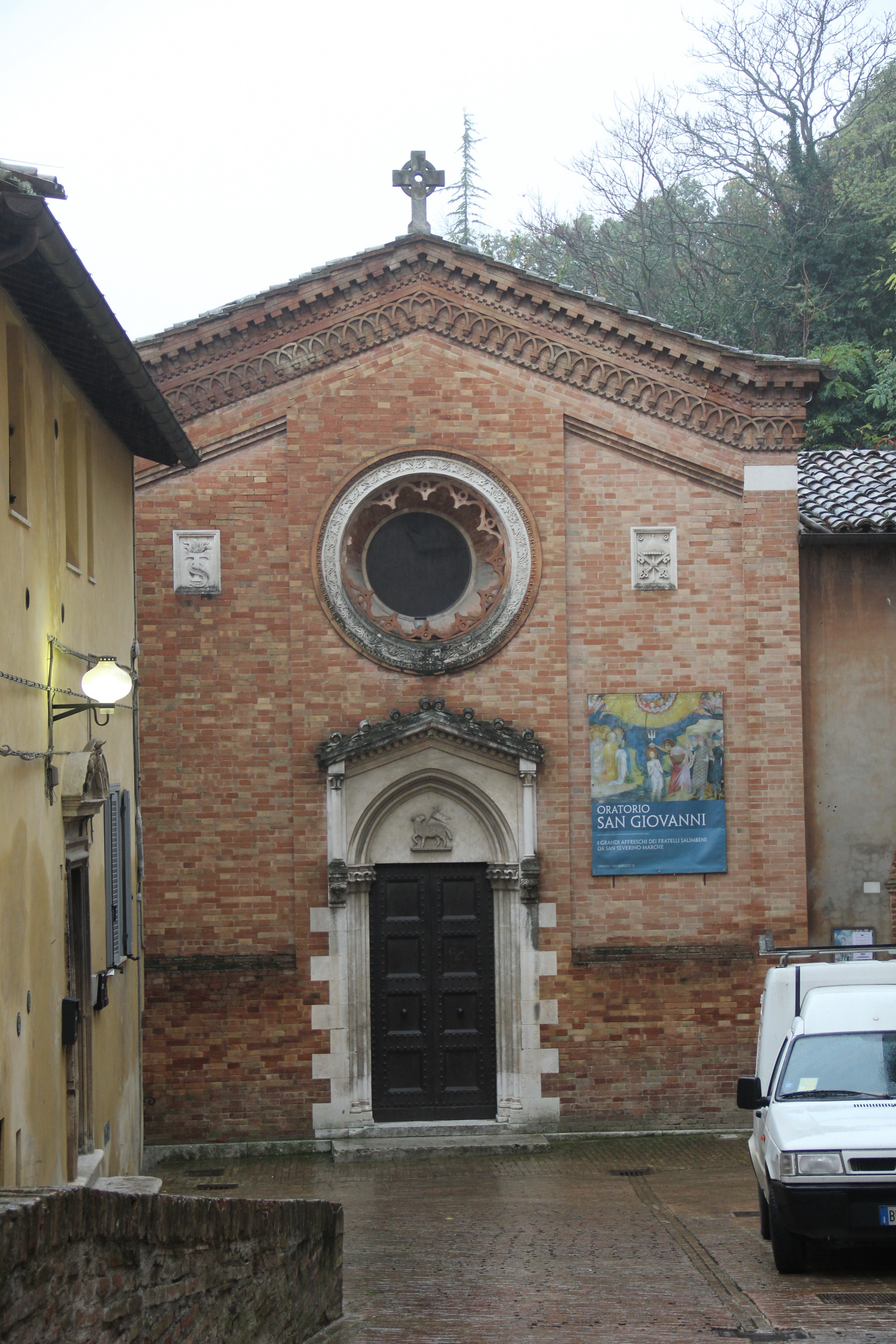

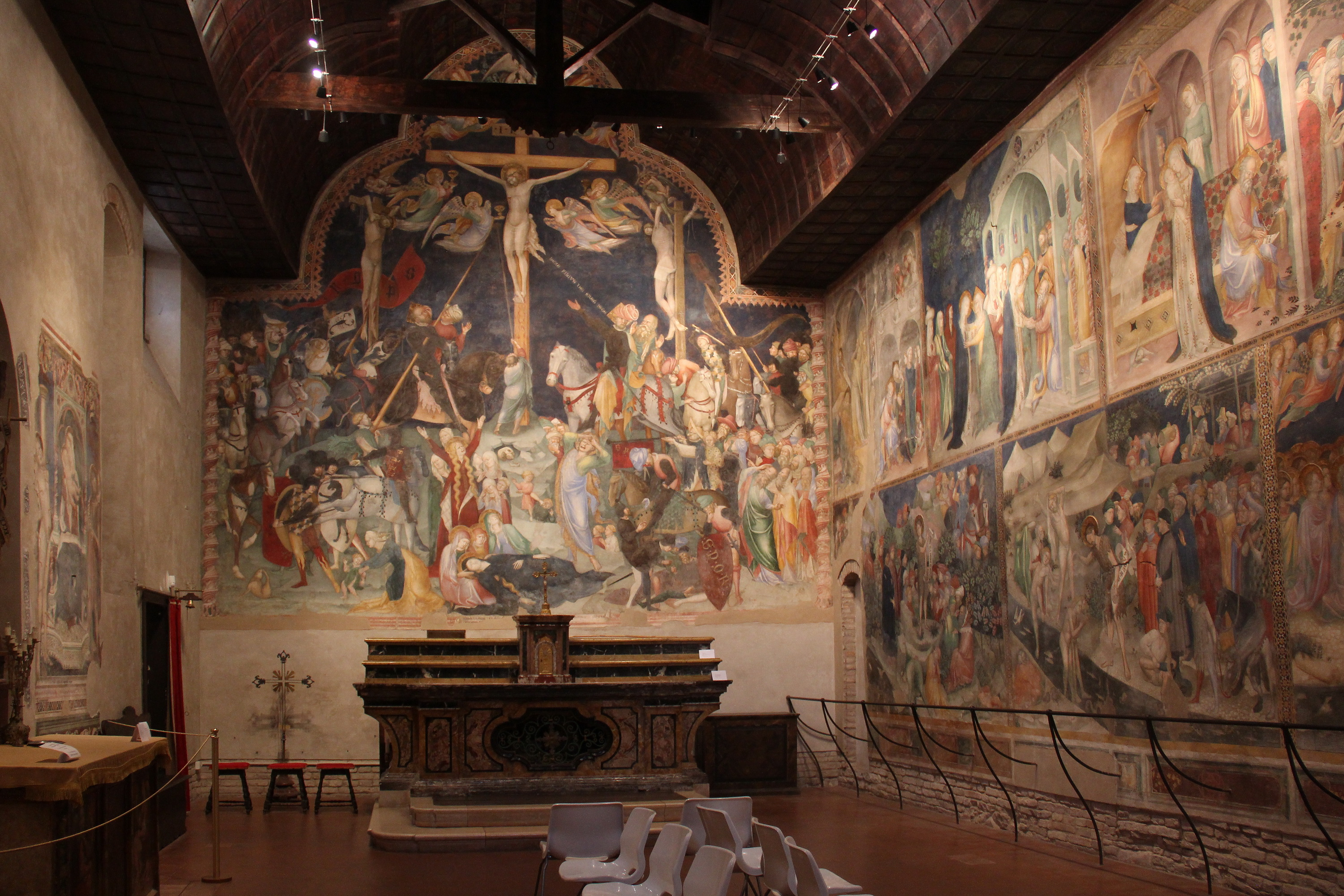

The Oratory of St John the Baptist (Oratorio di San Giovanni Battista) is a 14th-century small chapel or prayer hall located in Via Francesco Barocci, in Urbino, Region of the Marche, Italy.

The oratory is best known for its late Gothic style fresco cycle (1416) by the brothers Lorenzo and Jacopo Salimbeni. The subjects include a Madonna dell’Umiltà and a Crucifixion, In addition the oratory has scenes from the life of John the Baptist such as: the Annunciation of Birth; his Baptism of Jesus, Career in Baptizing, and Sermons of St John.
