= Santa Maria di Valdiola Chigiano =

Church building in Chigiano, Italy

Coordinates: 43.29256°N 13.1041°E

Santa Maria in Valdiola is a Roman Catholic parish church located in the rural neighborhood or frazione of Chigiano, north but within the limits of San Severino Marche, province of Macerata, Region of Marche, Italy.

The church was erected in the 13th century. The interior houses some 15th-century frescoes.
