= Santa Maria di Cesello, San Severino Marche =

Church building in San Severino Marche, Italy

Santa Maria di Cesello or St Mary of the Chisel is a 15th-century, Roman Catholic church, in San Severino Marche, region of Marche, Italy.

== History ==
The small church has a rustic and provincial Romanesque style, a wide sloping roof that protects a seventeenth-century fresco. Inside all walls are covered with votive frescoes dating from 15th to 17th centuries.
