= San Domenico, San Severino Marche =

Church building in San Severino Marche, Italy

Coordinates: 43.22971°N 13.1782°E

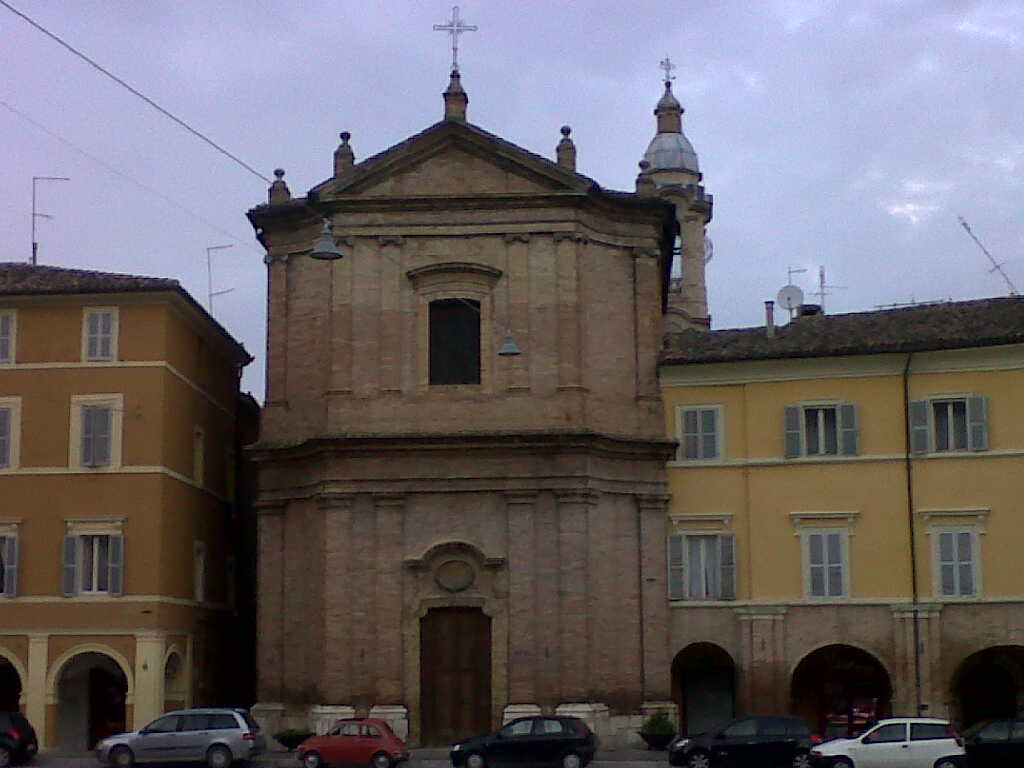
Chiesa san domenico, piazza del popolo

San Domenico or St Dominic is a 13th-century, Roman Catholic church, dedicated to a Marian devotion, located on Via E Rosa in San Severino Marche, region of Marche, Italy.

== History ==
This Dominican church and adjacent convent were built in the first half of the 13th century, with a number of subsequent refurbishments, including a major one in 1664 to which it owes to its present layout. Legend holds that the site was once on land donated to St Dominic by the town. The 17th-century renovations were designed by the Dominican friar, frate Giuseppe da Palermo. The church has a Romanesque-Gothic bell-tower.

The main altarpiece (1512) is a canvas by Bernardino di Mariotto. In the sacristy are remnants of frescoes by Lorenzo and Jacopo Salimbeni. In the cloister of the convent are frescoed lunettes, attributed to Sebastiano Ghezzi and Ludovico Lazzarelli.

In the second altar on the right is a St Dominic sustained by Angels attributed to Carlo Cignani. From the presbytery one can access the base of the bell-tower with a cycle of 15th-century frescoes depicting the Life of St Catherine by unknown Emilian painters. In the transept are gilded and carved wood altars: one has a 17th-century altarpiece of the Pentecost by an unknown Bolognese painter. A St Lucy in the altar is attributed to Ippolito Scarsella. Another chapel with baroque decor, has a canvas by Biagio Puccini depicting the Incredulity of St Thomas.
