= Paolo Bontulli =

Italian painter

Paolo Bontulli (active first half of 16th century) was an Italian painter, mainly of sacred subjects.

== Life and career ==
He was born in Percanestro, a frazione of Serravalle, and active in the Marche. Among his works are:

- Madonna and Child (before 1520) for Madonna del Piano, Rocchetta
- Madonna and Child (1525) for Santuario della Madonna della Stella presso Montefalco
- Madonna and Child (1521) for Church of San Martino, Santangelo di Visso
- Madonna and Child (1525, now lost) for San Giovanni di Pietrasrossa presso Trevi
- Polyptych of Madonna and Child and Saints James and Roch (1507) originally from San Giacomo in Potenza Picena, on exhibit in Galleria Nazionale delle Marche, Urbino
- Resurrected Christ Blessing with Saints Peter and Paul, Museo di Firenze

Among the influences cited for the painter are Carlo and Vittore Crivelli, Giovanni Boccati, Giovanni Angelo d’Antonio, Ludovico Urbani, and Lorenzo d’Alessandro.
