= Madonna with the Christ Child Reading =

Painting by Pinturicchio

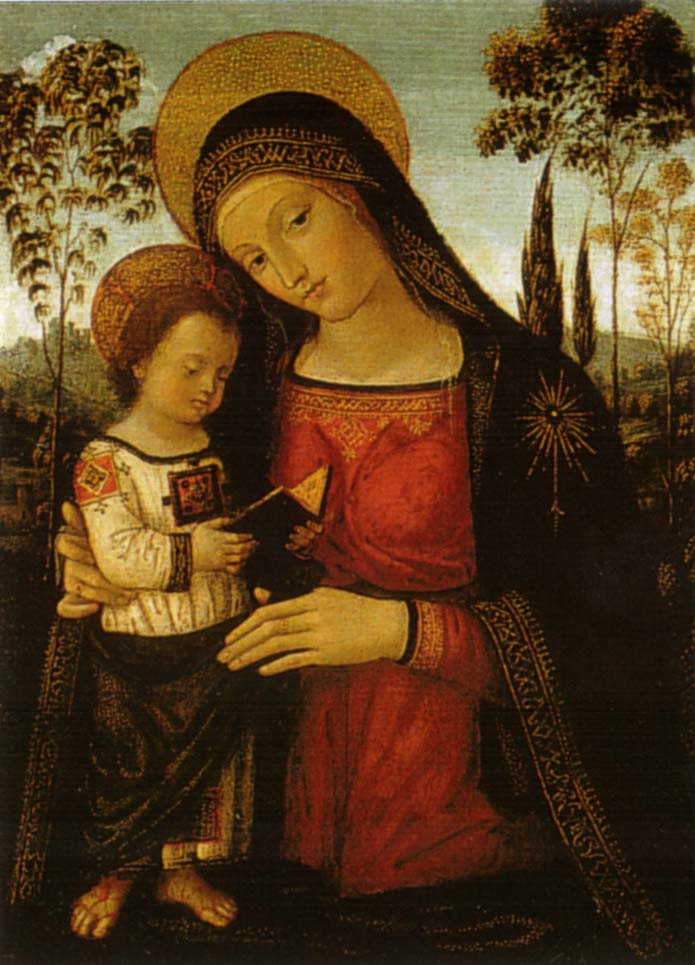
- Artist: Pinturicchio
- Year: c. 1494-1498
- Medium: oil on panel
- Dimensions: 33,7 cm × 25,4 cm (133 in × 100 in)
- Location: North Carolina Museum of Art, Raleigh, NC

Madonna with the Christ Child Reading is a c.1494–1498 oil on panel painting by Pinturicchio, now in the North Carolina Museum of Art in Raleigh. It is a simplified autograph version of Madonna of Peace by the same artist.
