= Chiesa della Maestà, San Severino Marche =

Roman Catholic church in Marche, Italy

Coordinates: 43°12′19.1″N 13°23′21.4″E

The Chiesa della Maestà or Church of her Majesty is a Roman Catholic church, dedicated to a Marian devotion, sited at Localita Parolito in San Severino Marche, region of Marche, Italy.

== History ==
The church was built in 1473 at the site of an icon of the Virgin, it retains the original terracotta portal with beautiful floral decorations and two small side doors. Inside are 15th-century votive frescoes, painted by Lorenzo D'Alessandro.
