= Madonna of Peace (Pinturicchio) =

15th c. panel painting by Perugino

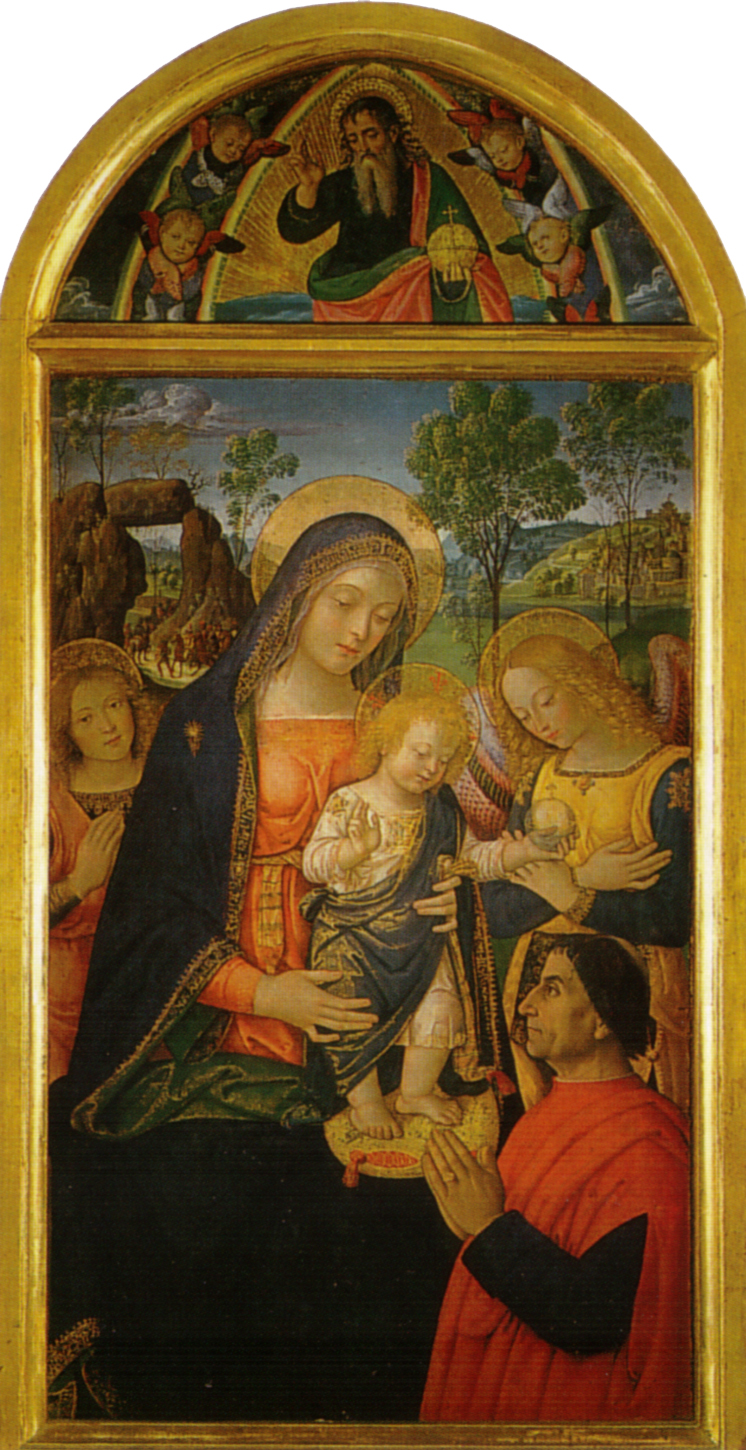
- Artist: Pinturicchio
- Year: c. 1490
- Medium: oil on panel
- Dimensions: 143 cm × 70 cm (56 in × 28 in)
- Location: Pinacoteca Civica Padre Pietro Tacchi Venturi, San Severino Marche

Madonna of Peace is an oil on panel painting by Pinturicchio, now in the Pinacoteca Civica Padre Pietro Tacchi Venturi in San Severino Marche. It is one of the few authentically autographed works from the artist's early mature period.

== History ==
Liberato Bartelli gave this artwork to the Duomo in San Severino Marche. He was a native of the city and was then serving as protonotary apostolic and canon of Santa Maria in Trastevere in Rome. At the end of 1488, he was made prior of the church in his home town of San Severino Marche. He seems to have commissioned the work to commemorate this event. Pinturicchio was then among a new generation of artists working in Rome and probably delivered the work around 1490.

Pinturicchio used the painting's figure of the Madonna as a model for later autograph works such as Madonna with the Christ Child Reading (North Carolina Museum of Art) and Madonna with the Christ Child Writing (Philadelphia Museum of Art), both datable to between 1494 and 1498. Other Madonnas derived from it (such as that in the Kress collection (now part of the National Gallery of Art in Washington) are studio works.

== Description and style ==
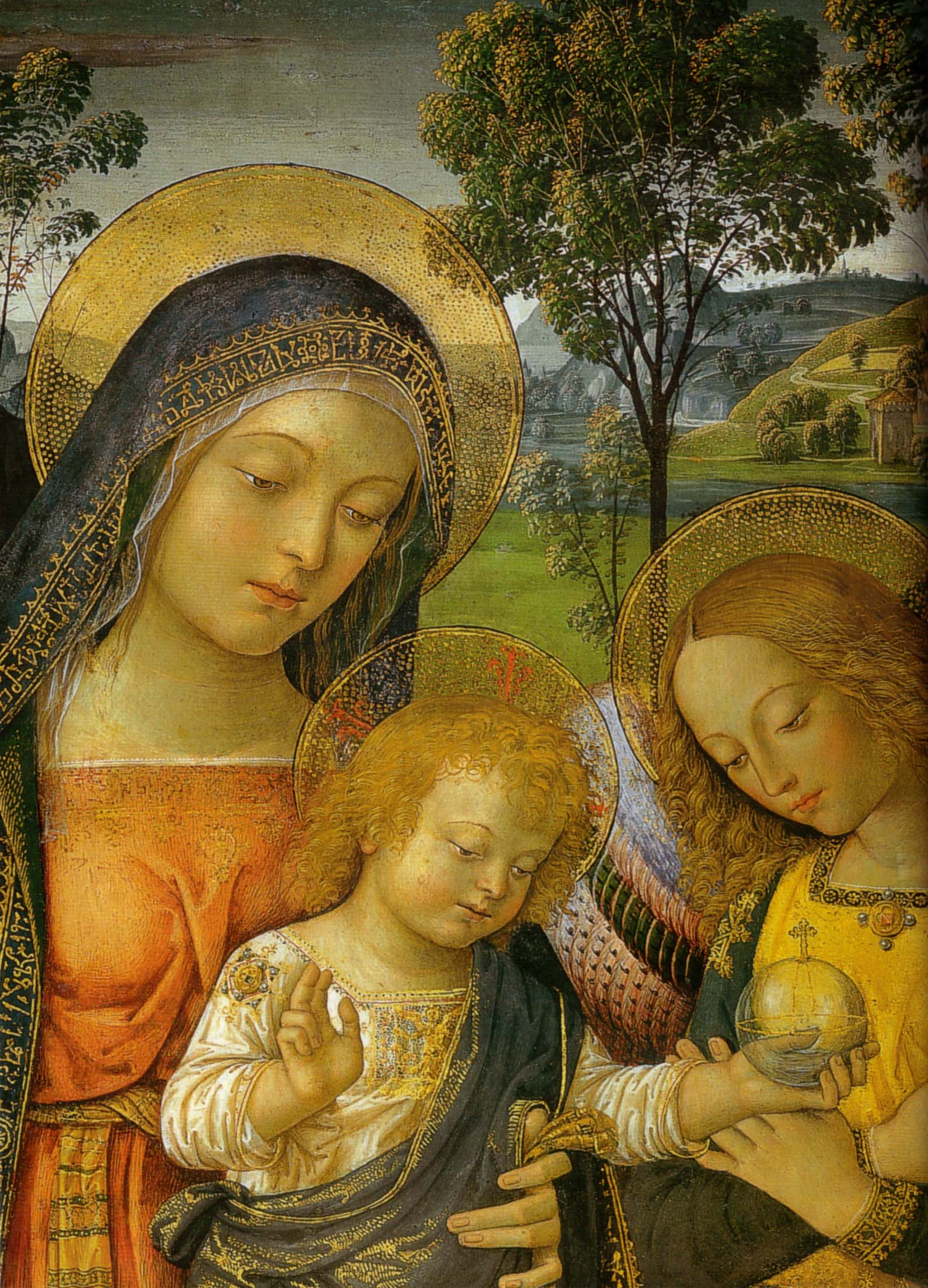
Detail of the painting

The painting, nearly unanimously praised by critics, shows the Madonna seated with the Baby Jesus in her lap. In his left hand, he holds a globus cruciger, a cross-bearing orb that symbolizes his divine power over the earth. With his right hand, he gives benediction to the kneeling client below, who is represented in profile with detailed attention to its facial features (the brow furrows, veins, and the consistency of the loose hair). That detail reveals Pinturicchio's study of Flemish painting.

The Baby Jesus is not semi-nude, as he is in Umbrian and Tuscan depictions contemporary with this painting. Instead, he has the clothing of a "little redeemer", with a rich dalmatic and a pallium that come perhaps from the influence of Byzantine mosaics in Rome.

To the sides, angels capture and direct the viewer's gaze. One looks at the viewer directly (like the so-called role of the "reveler", taken from sacred representations of Renaissance theater). The other angel reclines its head against Jesus' gesture of benediction. Their faces are an ideal of rarefied beauty, with studied inclination of head and gesture.

The drapery decorations follow the tip of the brush, for example, the embroidered clothing of Jesus, with its flashes of pearls set on the sleeves.

The background has the look of Umbrian landscape paintings, with hills punctuated by human presence that, among the slender, leafy trees, fades into the distance, softened by haze. At the left, there is a natural Roccoco arch, a typical fantastical invention of the painter, that is reminiscent of the School of Ferrara. Under it, some knights and infantrymen pass, which is perhaps an allusion to the army of Herod and the Massacre of the Innocents.

The figures in the first plan are monumental, yet fluid, (perhaps the influence of Florentine painting and Antoniazzo Romano) and resplendent in bright colors and the profusion of gold finery. The halos, for example, are composed of punched gold that create a vibrant, dusty, and diffuse light, that lights up the painting as in elaborate gold filigree. Golden highlights are visible in the hair or clothes of people or the countryside, and above all the leafy foliage.

The lunette shows Jesus giving an "eternal benediction" within a mandorla of little angels, following a pattern of Perugino.
