= Sant'Eustachio in Domora =

Church in San Severino Marche, Italy

Coordinates: 43°12′37″N 13°08′45″E

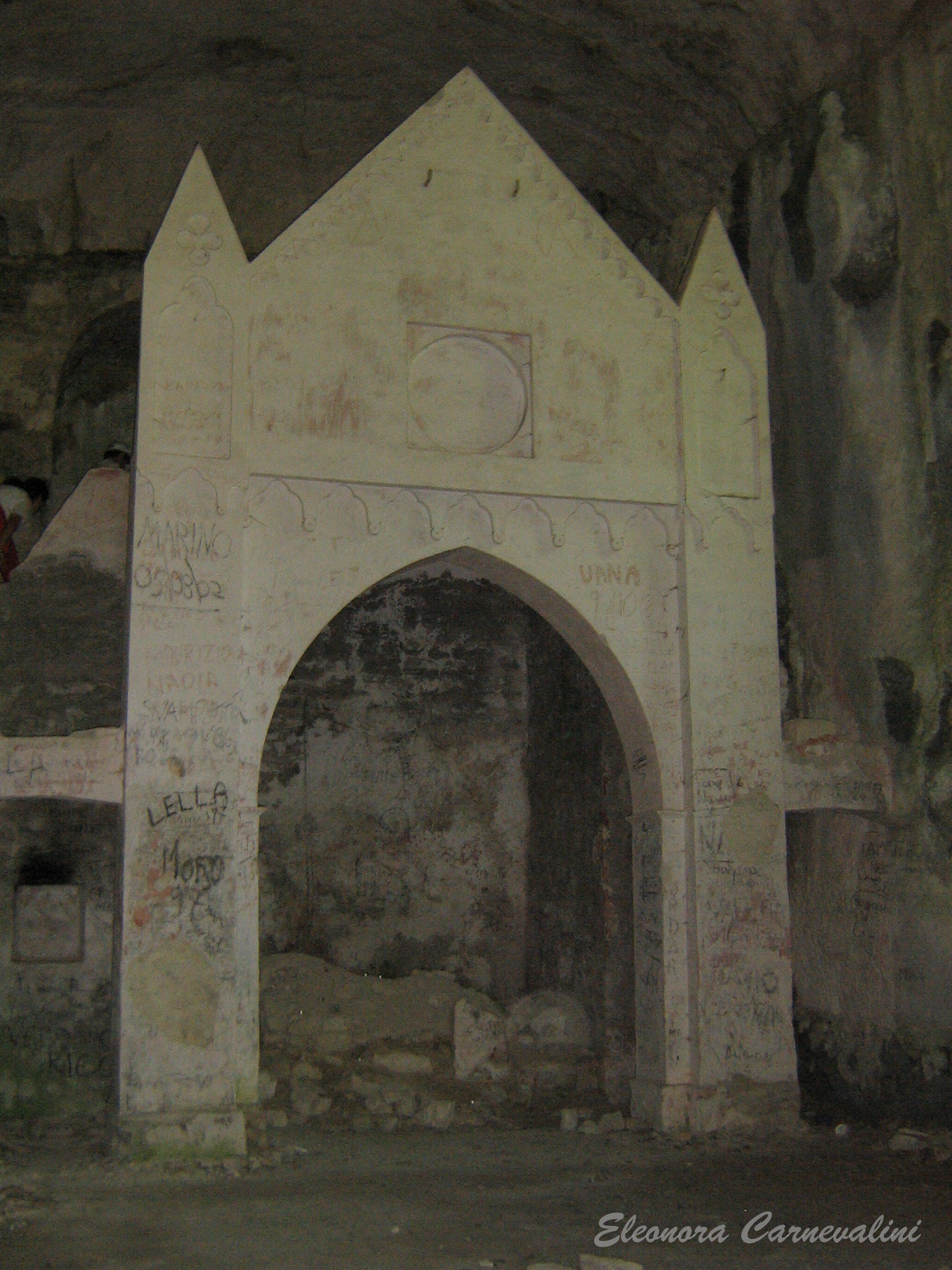

Sant'Eustachio in Dòmora is an abandoned medieval rock carved chapel, also called a troglodyte church, and Benedictine monastery built into cliffs in the Valle dei Grilli, southeast of San Severino Marche, in the region of Marche, Italy. It is also called the Grotte di Sant'Eustachio. The site is difficult to access and the structures in ruinous shape, partially choked by vegetation.

The original 11th-century chapel associated with a hermitage was initially dedicated to St Michael Archangel, and was likely excavated by Benedictine monks from a village of miners. From 1263 to 1281, the site was enlarged and rededicated to St Eustachius. An adjacent monastery, with monastic cells built into crevices and caves in the rock, aided pilgrims passing through. However, by the early 14th century, the primitive monastery was abandoned.

The small chapel is remarkable for being partially carved into the cliff and having Romanesque elements. The entrance is now walled up but has a rounded portal of decorated travertine marble. A round window is above the entrance. The interior, partially vandalized with graffiti has a peculiar stone altar shelter.

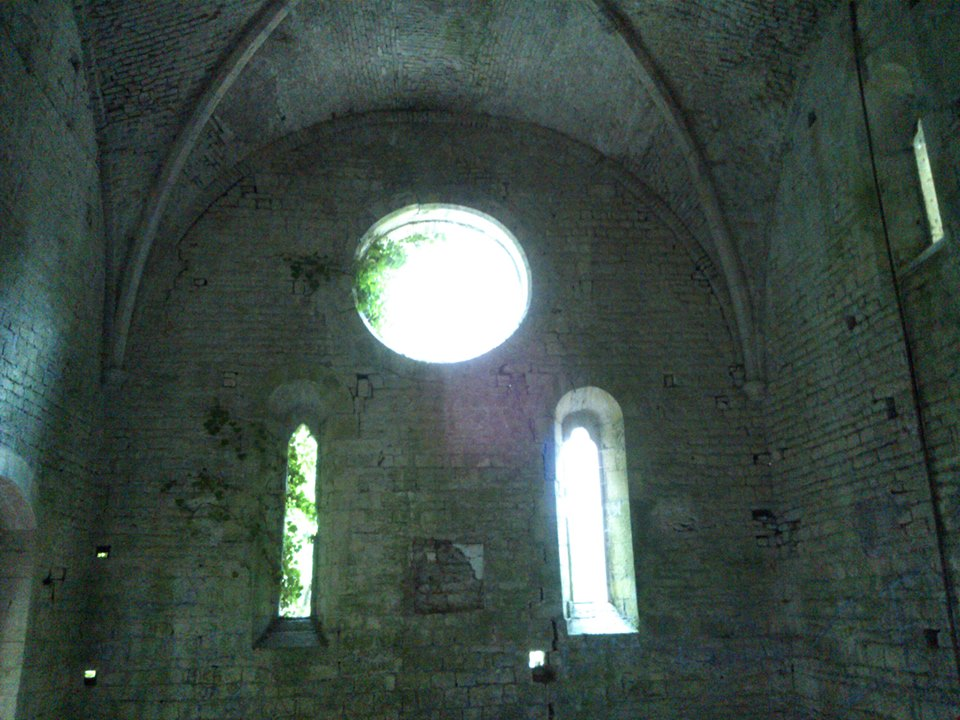
