= Madonna dei Lumi, San Severino Marche =

Church in Marche, Italy

Coordinates: 43°13′31.3″N 13°10′42.9″E

Santuario di Santa Maria dei Lumi
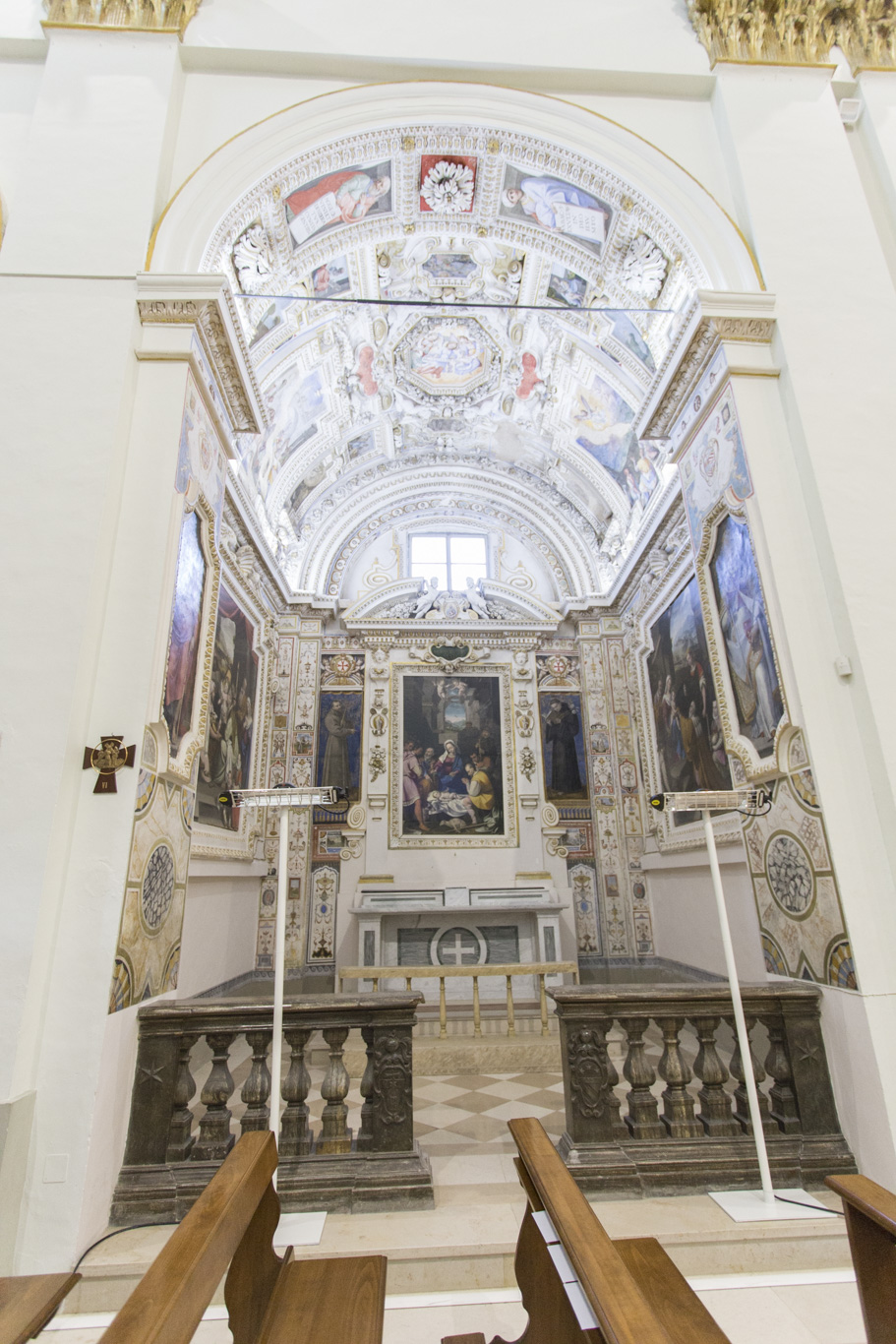

- Location: San Severino Marche, Marche
- Country: Italy
- Denomination: Catholic

The Sanctuary of the Madonna dei Lumi is a Renaissance style, Roman Catholic small church located in central San Severino Marche, region of Marche, Italy.

== History ==
The sanctuary was established by the first arriving priest of the Order of Phillip Neri; they chose to enlarge a votive chapel dedicated to a painting of the Madonna and Child (1560) by Giangentile Di Lorenzo. Tradition holds that during 1584, the painting had miraculously emitted light. They initiated construction of the sanctuary using a design by Giovanni Battista Guerra, a lay oratorian. A prior, more elaborate design by Ludovico Carducci and funded in 1585 by the Duke of Urbino Francesco Maria II was abandoned.

By 1601, after an onslaught of the plague attacked the town, the Filippini abandoned the sanctuary to the Barnabites to complete. This latter order was suppressed in 1861 and the sanctuary passed into the custody of the Cistercian order.

The sanctuary has a modified Greek Cross design with three rounded lobes (apse and tribune arms) and a flat façade. Along the nave from the entrance are two chapels on each side. On the first chapel on the right is an altarpiece of the Blessed Alessandro Sauli presented by Angels to San Carlo Borromeo attributed to Felice Torelli. In the next chapel on the right, the canvas depicts the Life of the Virgin by Giovanni Andrea Urbini.

The chapels on the left were decorated from 1593 to 1596 by the painter Felice Damiani and the stucco artist Vincenzo da Camerino. Among the depictions are a Visitation, the Dream of St Joseph, and a Travel of Mary and Joseph to the House of Elizabeth. The second chapel has an Adoration of the Magi, a Circumcision, and an Adoration of the Shepherds. The cupola was frescoed (1657) by Giulio Lazzarelli.
