= Sarnano =

- Comune
- Comune di Sarnano
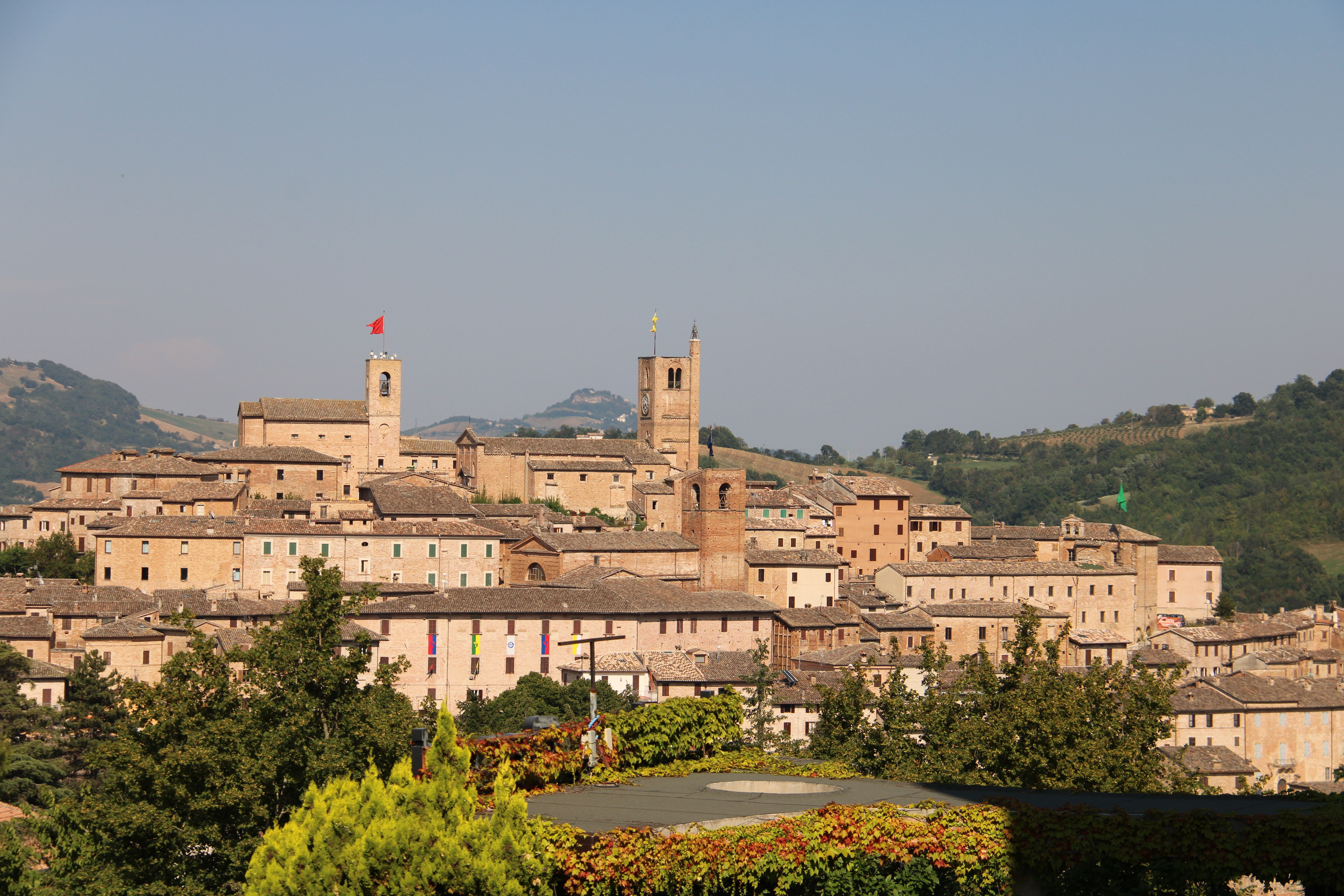

- Location within Italy Location within Marche
- Coordinates: 43°2′N 13°18′E
- Country: Italy
- Region: Marche
- Province: Macerata (MC)

Government
  - Mayor: Luca Piergentili

Area
  - Total: 63.0 km^{2} (24.3 sq mi)
- Elevation: 539 m (1,768 ft)

Population (30 November 2016)
  - Total: 3,268
  - Density: 51.9/km^{2} (134/sq mi)
- Demonym: Sarnanesi
- Time zone: UTC+1 (CET)
  - Summer (DST): UTC+2 (CEST)
- Postal code: 62028
- Dialing code: 0733
- Website: Official website

Sarnano is a comune (municipality) in the Province of Macerata in the Italian region Marche, located about 70 kilometres (43 mi) southwest of Ancona and about 30 kilometres (19 mi) southwest of Macerata.

Sarnano borders the following municipalities: Amandola, Bolognola, Fiastra, Gualdo, Montefortino, San Ginesio. It is one of I Borghi più belli d'Italia ("The most beautiful villages of Italy").

== Main sights ==
Among the churches in town is the church of Santa Maria Assunta and the Abbey of St Blaise in Piobbico, in the countryside the Hermitage of Soffiano.

== People ==
- Anelio Bocci (b. 1953), marathon runner
- Francesco Picarelli
- Costanzo de Sarnano

== See also ==
- Death of Jeanette Bishop and Gabriella Guerin
