= Pinacoteca Civica Padre Pietro Tacchi Venturi =

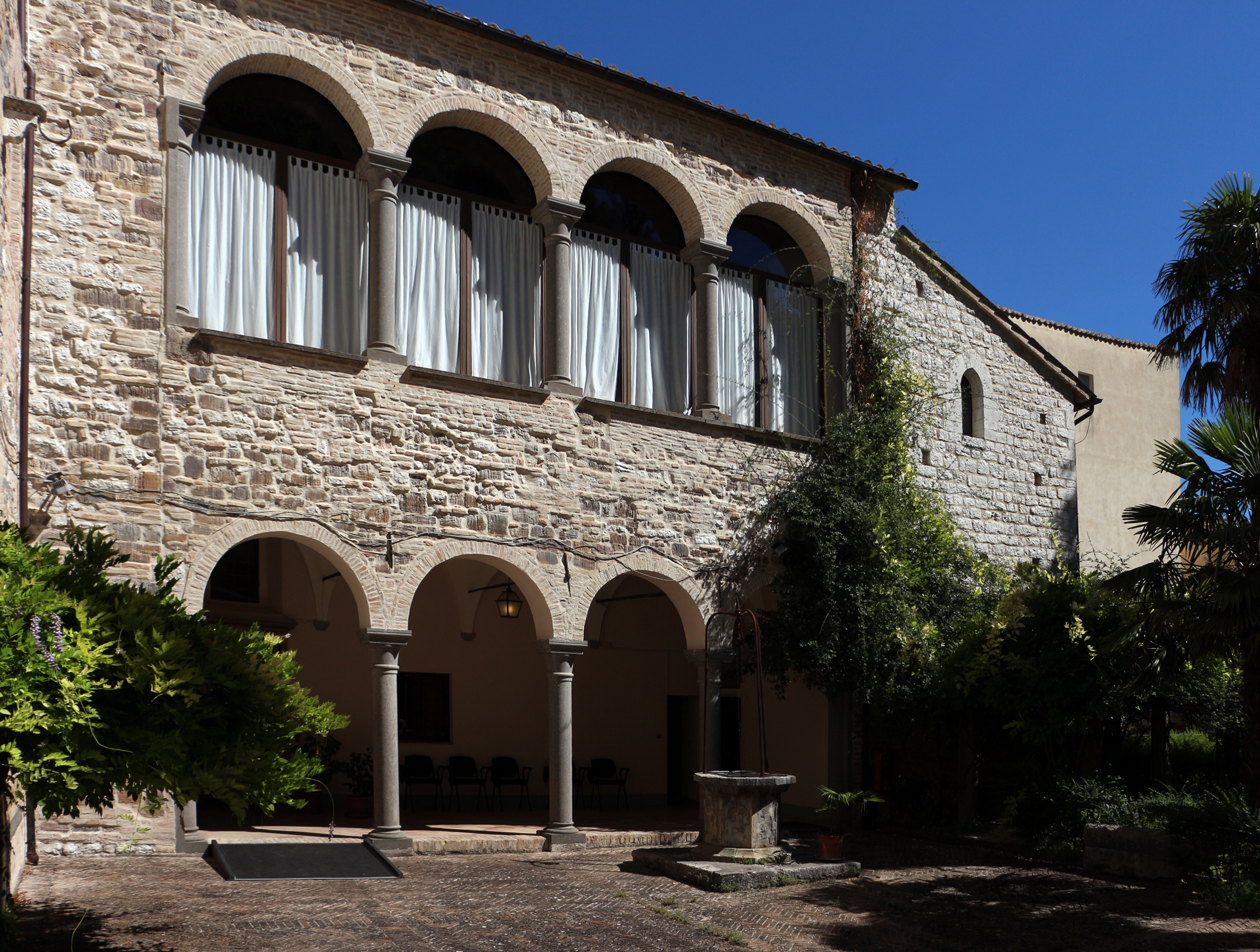
- Established: 1974; 52 years ago
- Location: Via Salimbeni, 39 - San Severino Marche, Italy
- Coordinates: 43.2283°N 13.1743°E
- Website: Pinacoteca Civica Padre Pietro Tacchi Venturi - Official Website

The Pinacoteca Civica Padre Pietro Tacchi Venturi is the civic art gallery of the town of San Severino Marche, region of Marche, Italy. Located at Via Salimbeni 39, it mainly displays sacred paintings from prior centuries.

== Structure ==
The art gallery and museum was constituted in 1974 to house collections of works from former local churches and monasteries. Among its collections are works by the brothers Lorenzo (Mystical Marriage of St Catherine) and Jacopo Salimbeni, Paolo Veneziano, Allegretto Nuzi (Madonna dell'Umiltà), Lorenzo d'Alessandro (Pietà); Vittore Crivelli (a polyptych depicting the Madonna and Saints), and Pinturicchio (Madonna della Pace); two canvases by Pomarancio; fresco fragments by followers of Giotto; a Martyrdom of St Bartholemew by a 17th-century Lombard painter; a number of wooden engravings in globes; and wooden choir stalls (1513), including ones by the studio of Domenico Indivini.

== Gallery ==
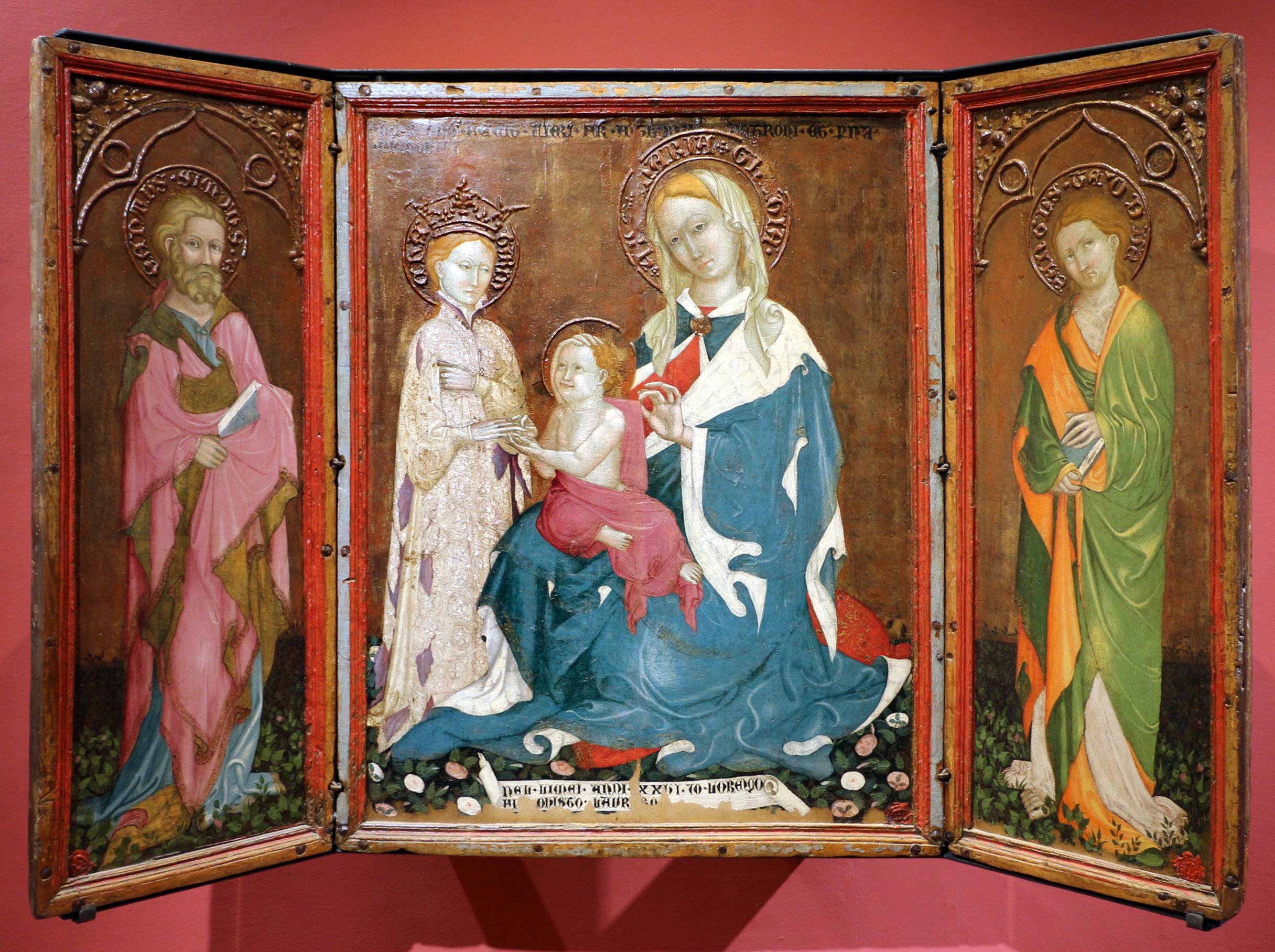
Mystical Marriage of St Catherine by Lorenzo Salimbeni and Jacopo Salimbeni

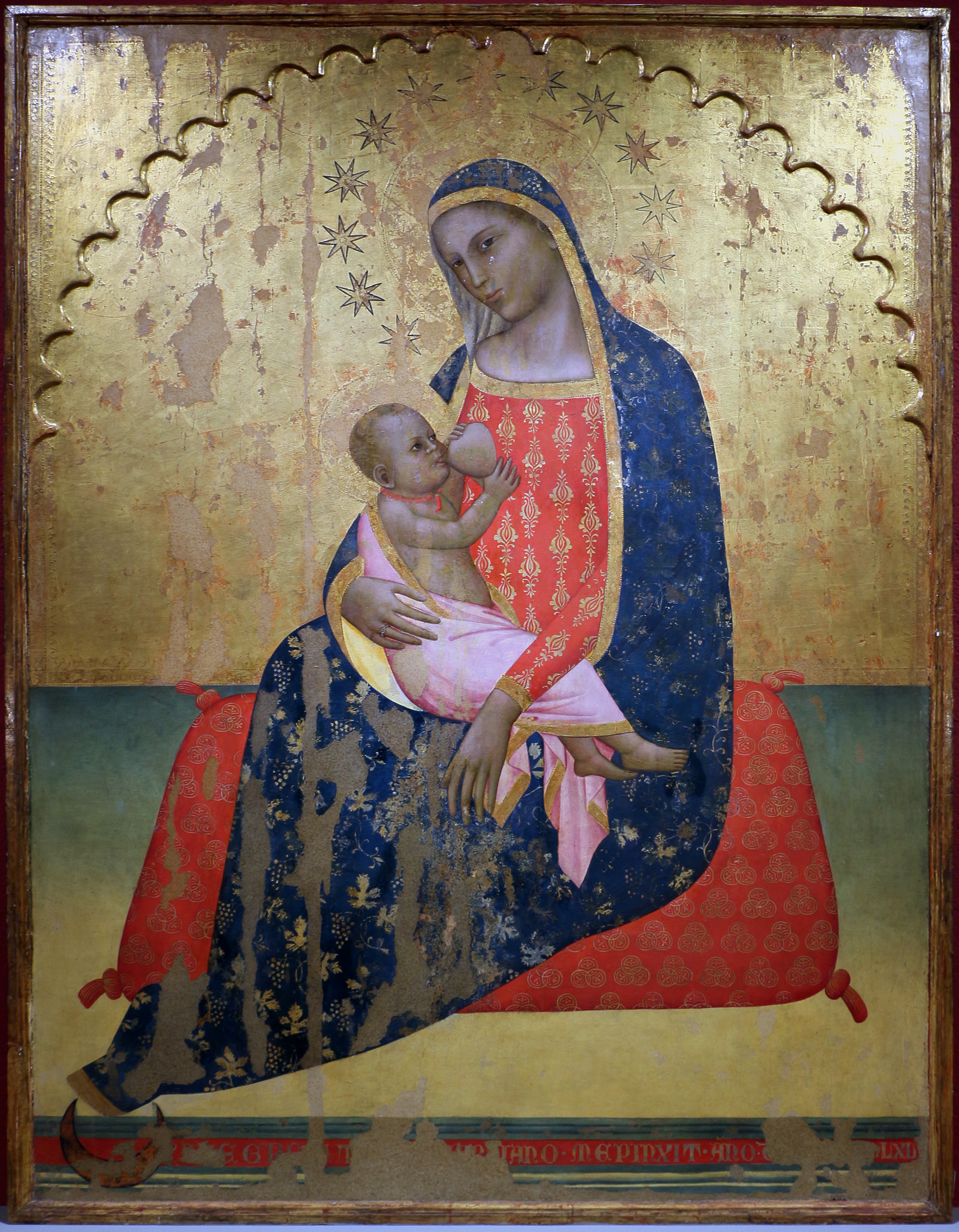
Madonna dell'Umiltà by Allegretto Nuzi

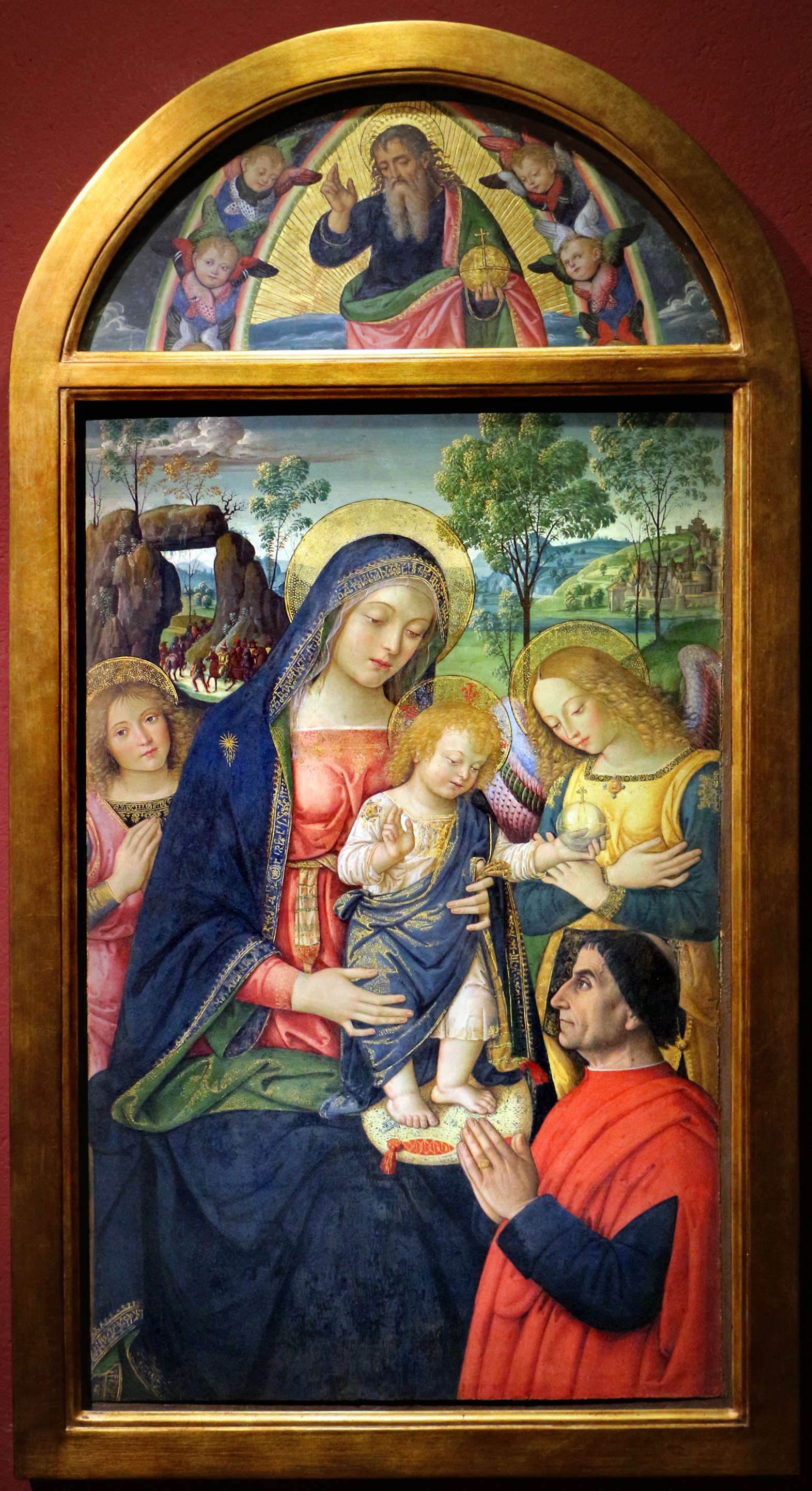
Madonna della Pace by Pinturicchio

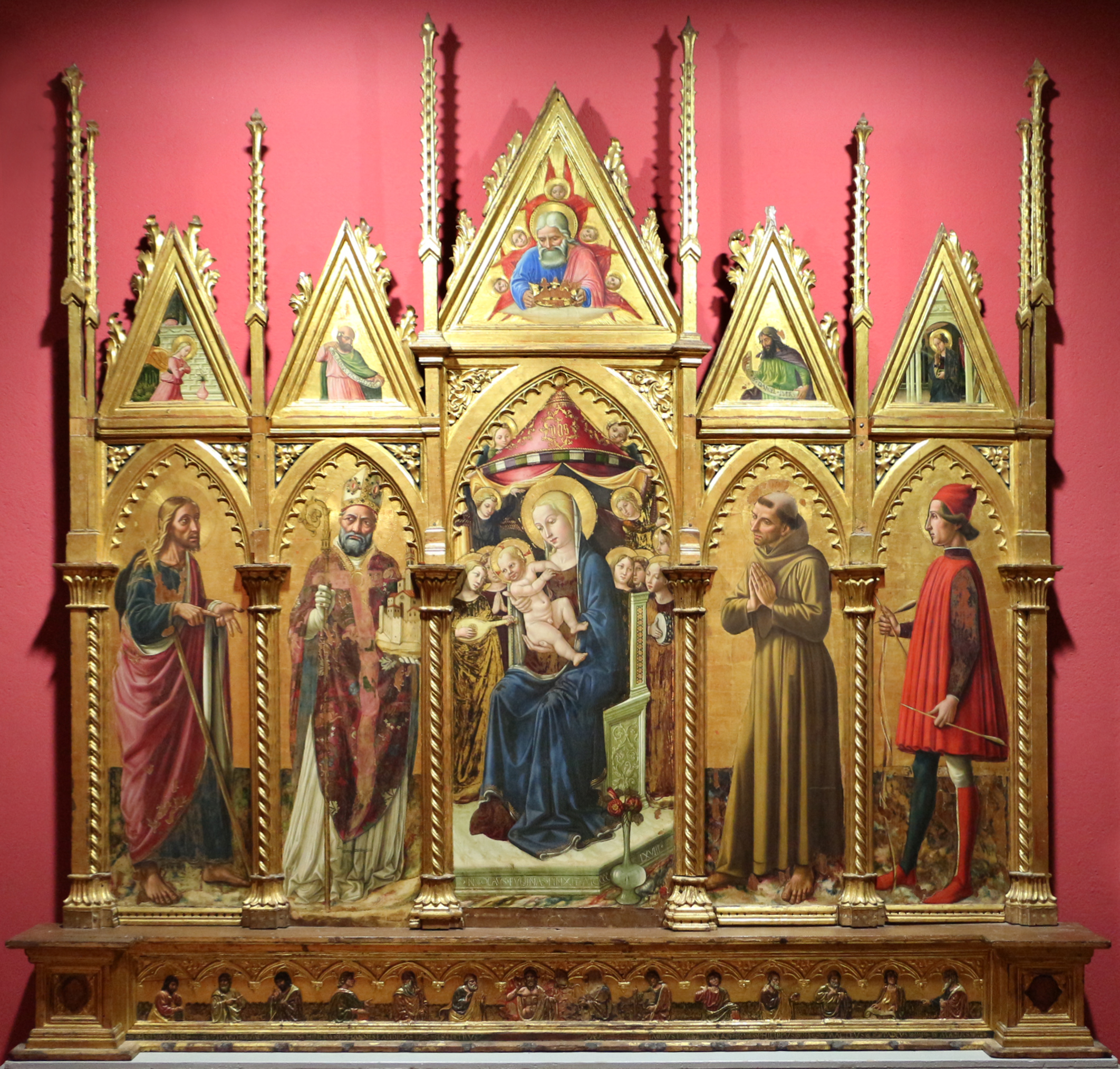
San Severino Polyptych by Niccolò Alunno

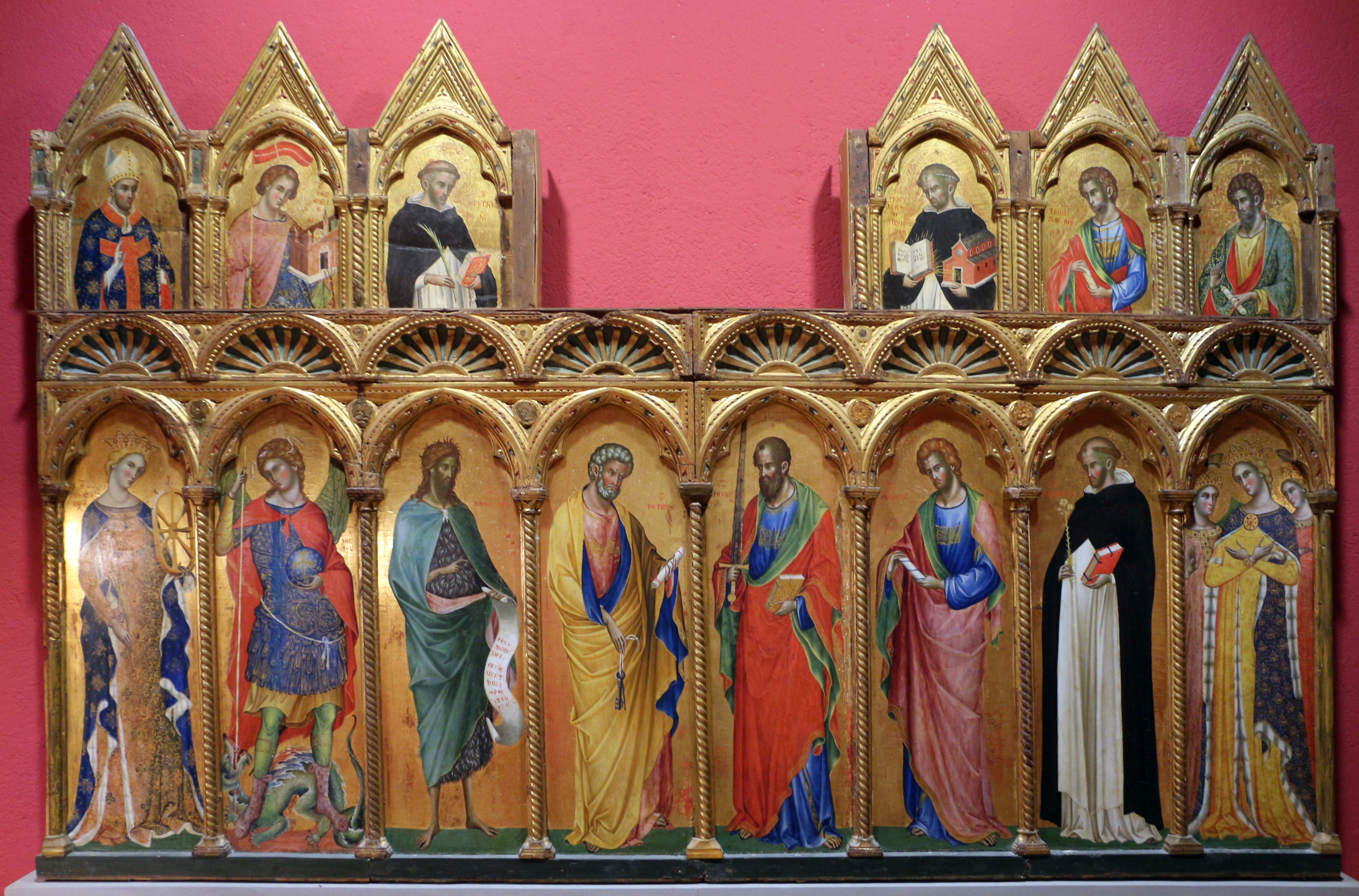
San Severino Polyptych by Paolo e Giovannino Veneziano

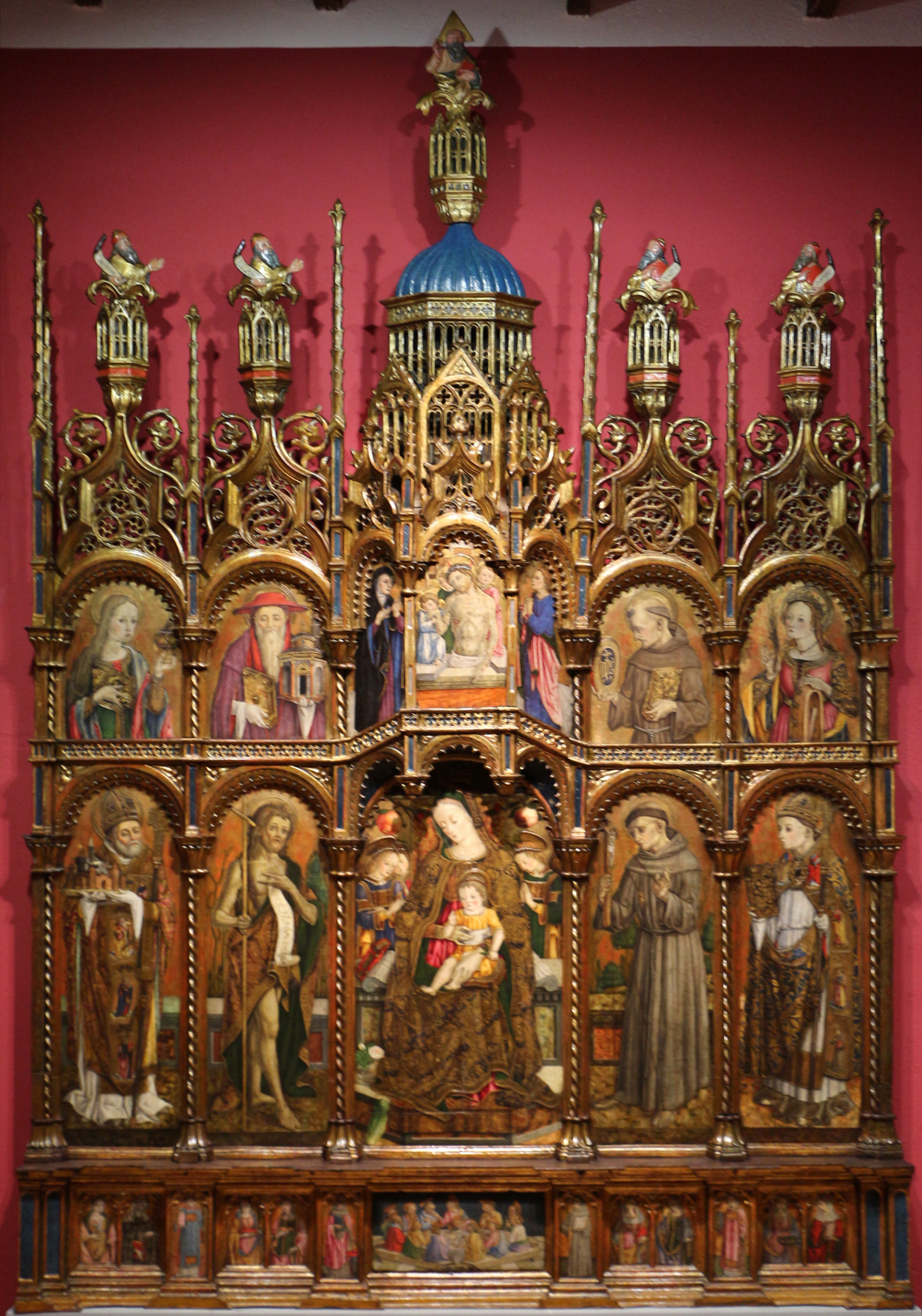
San Severino Polyptych by Vittore Crivelli
