= Lorenzo d'Alessandro =

Italian painter

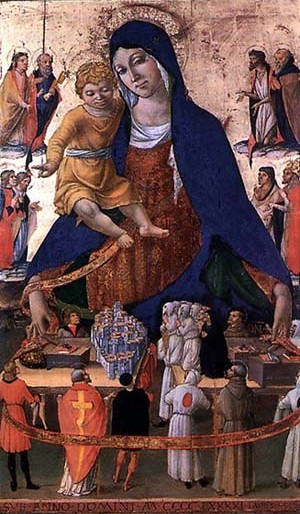
Panel of Madonna del Monte, Shrine in Madonna del Monte (Caldarola), 1491

Lorenzo d’Alessandro (c. 1455 – 1503) was an Italian painter and interpreter of late gothic style. He is known by different authorities and authors by different names, including:

- Lorenzo da San Severino or Sanseverino
- Lorenzo d’Alessandro da Sanseverino
- Lorenzo Salimbeni

== Biography ==
He was born in San Severino Marche. He painted in the salimbenian style inherited from the Salimbeni brothers, also from San Severino Marche; and influenced another important local painter, Niccolò Di Liberatore, also known as “L'Alunno” (from Foligno, who lived two years in San Severino and painted there a polyptych signed in 1468). Lorenzo was also inspired by Carlo Crivelli and Piero della Francesca. D’Alessandro blended the typical elements of the late Gothic culture and of the Renaissance in his expressive style. Among his pupils is Bernardino di Mariotto of Perugia, and his children: Antonio, Giangentile, and Severino.

He painted frescoes in Chiesa della Maestà, San Severino Marche.

Three of his paintings are displayed in the Pinacoteca Civica Padre Pietro Tacchi Venturi in San Severino Marche, including the Nativity, the Madonna with Child, and the Pietà.

== Gallery ==
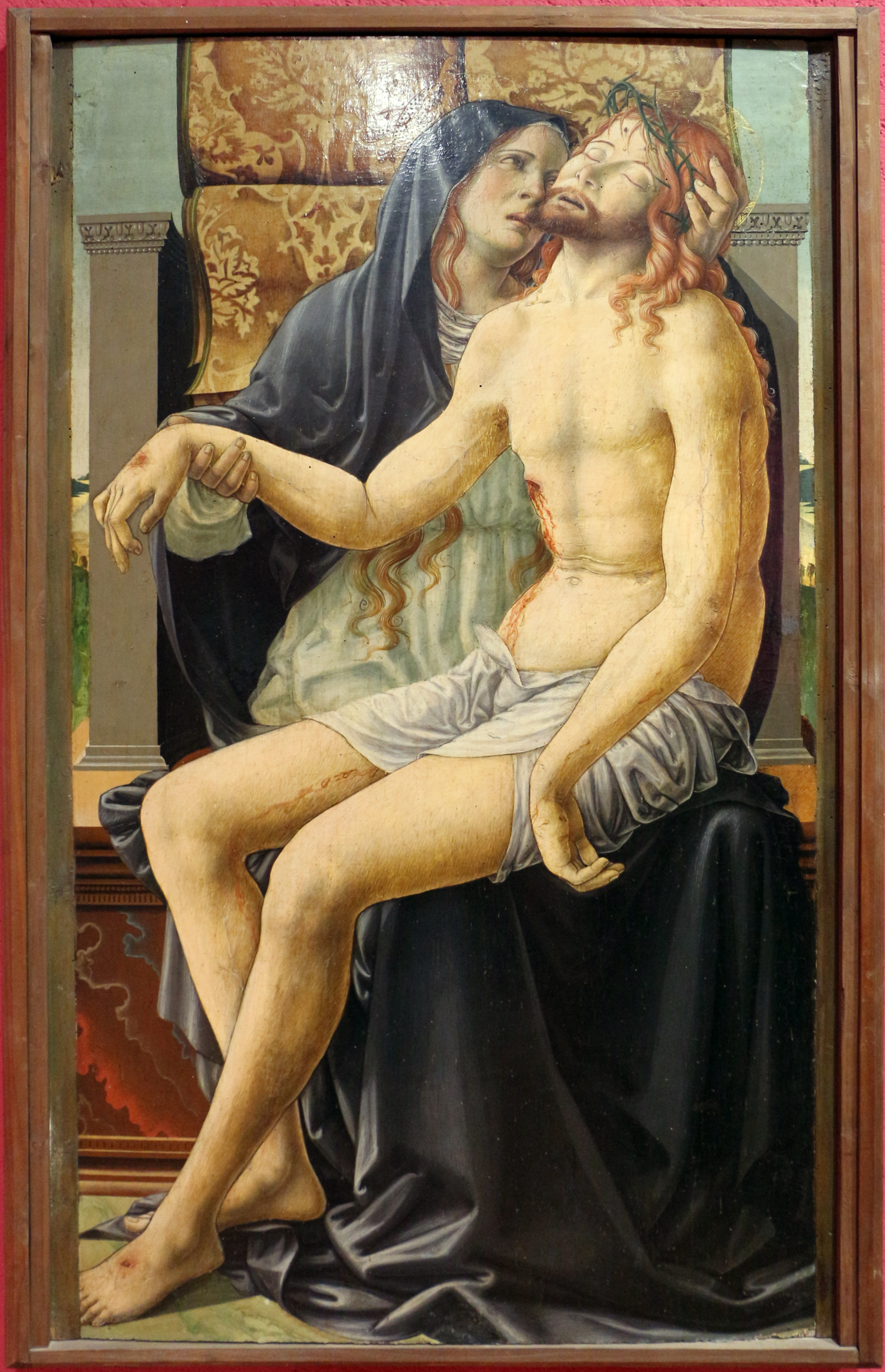
Pietà (1495)

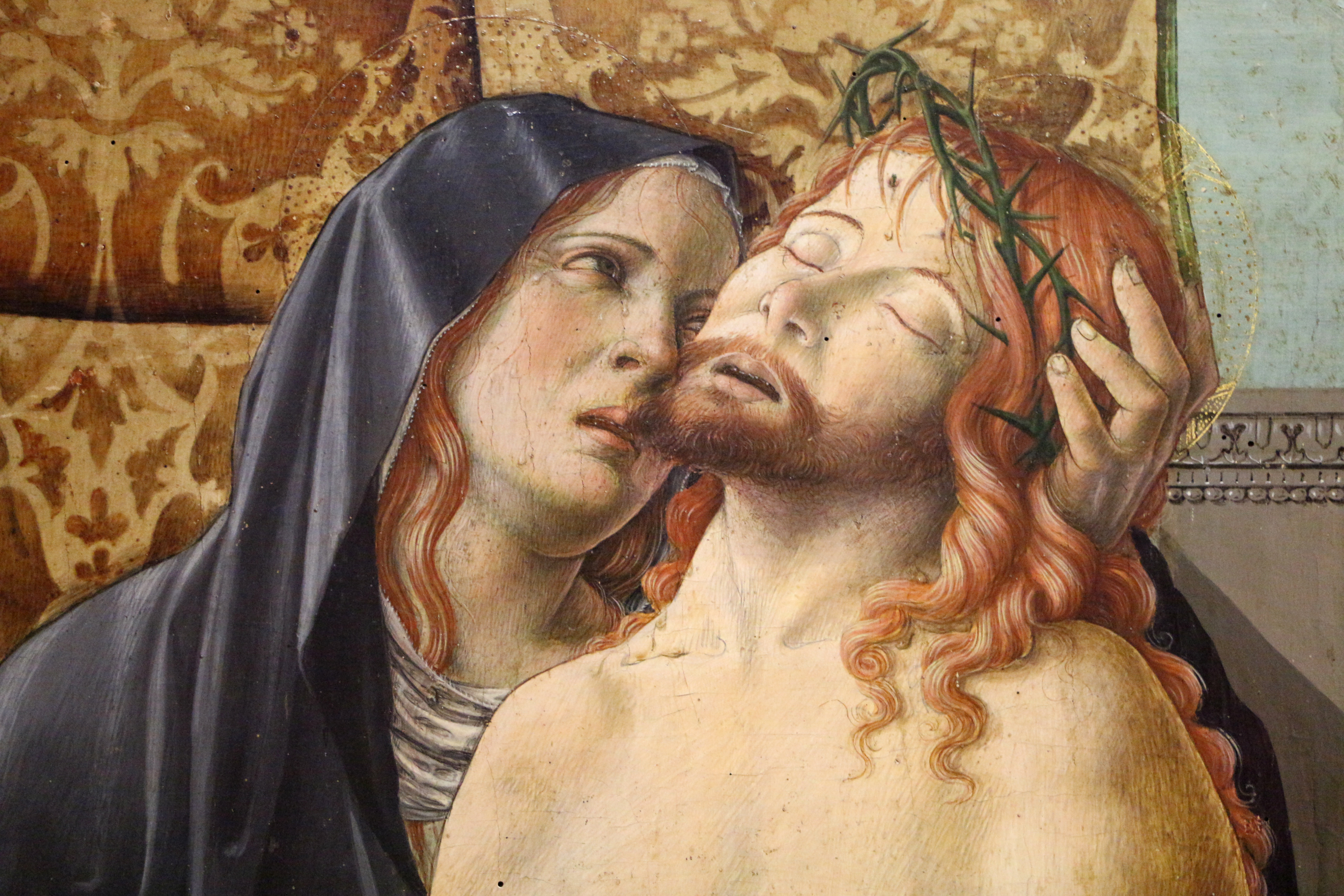
Pietà detail

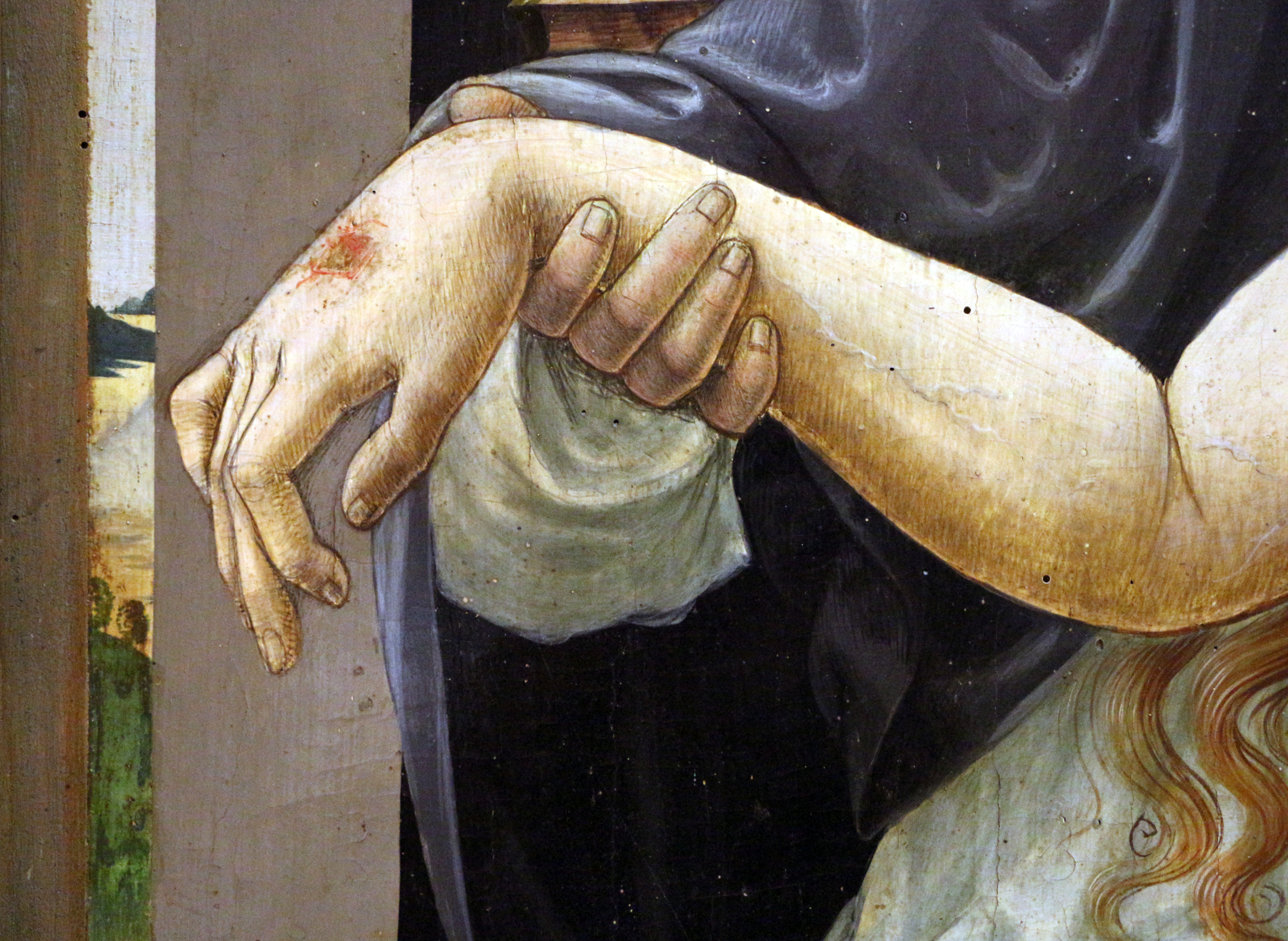
Pietà detail

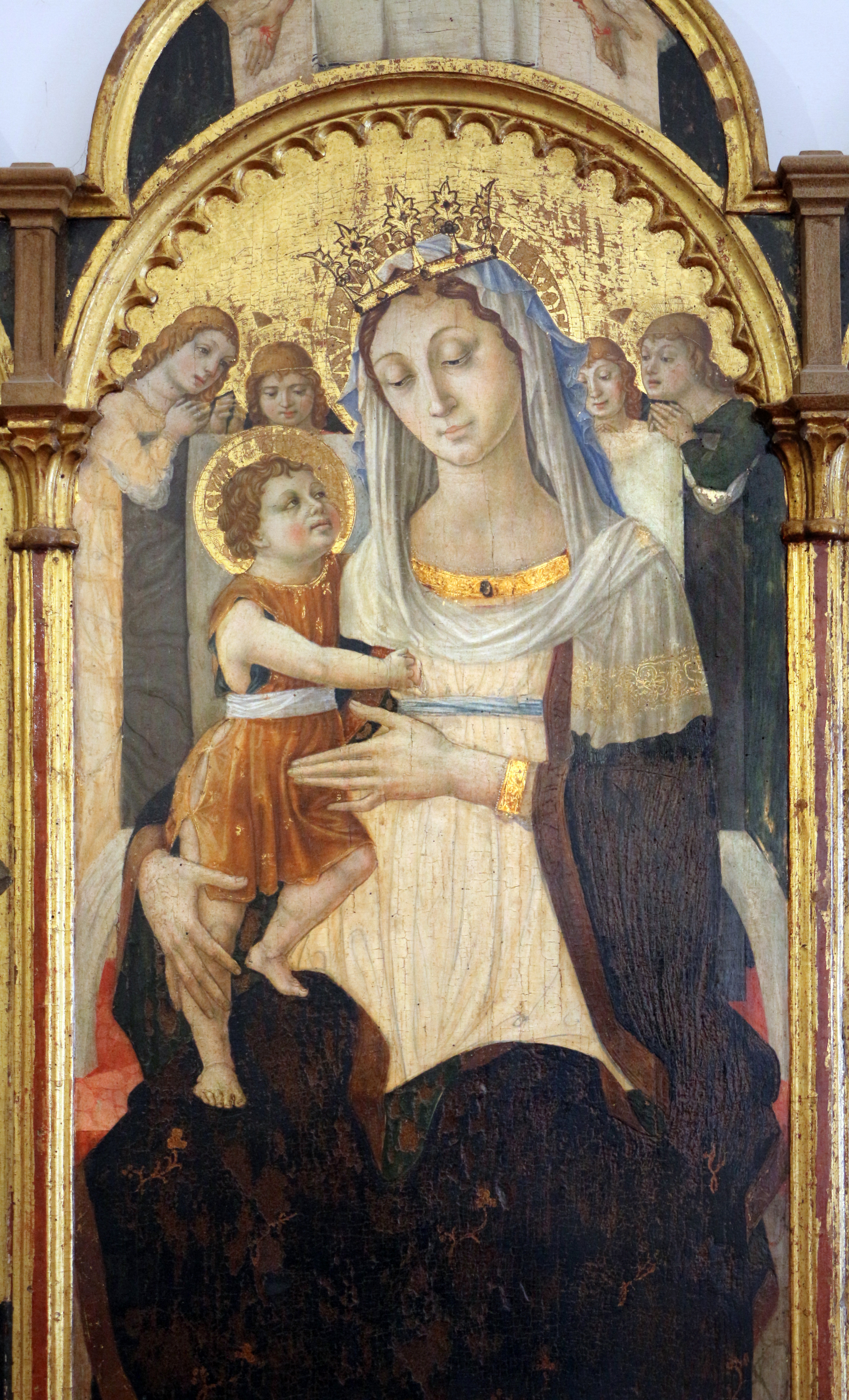
Madonna and Child (1481)

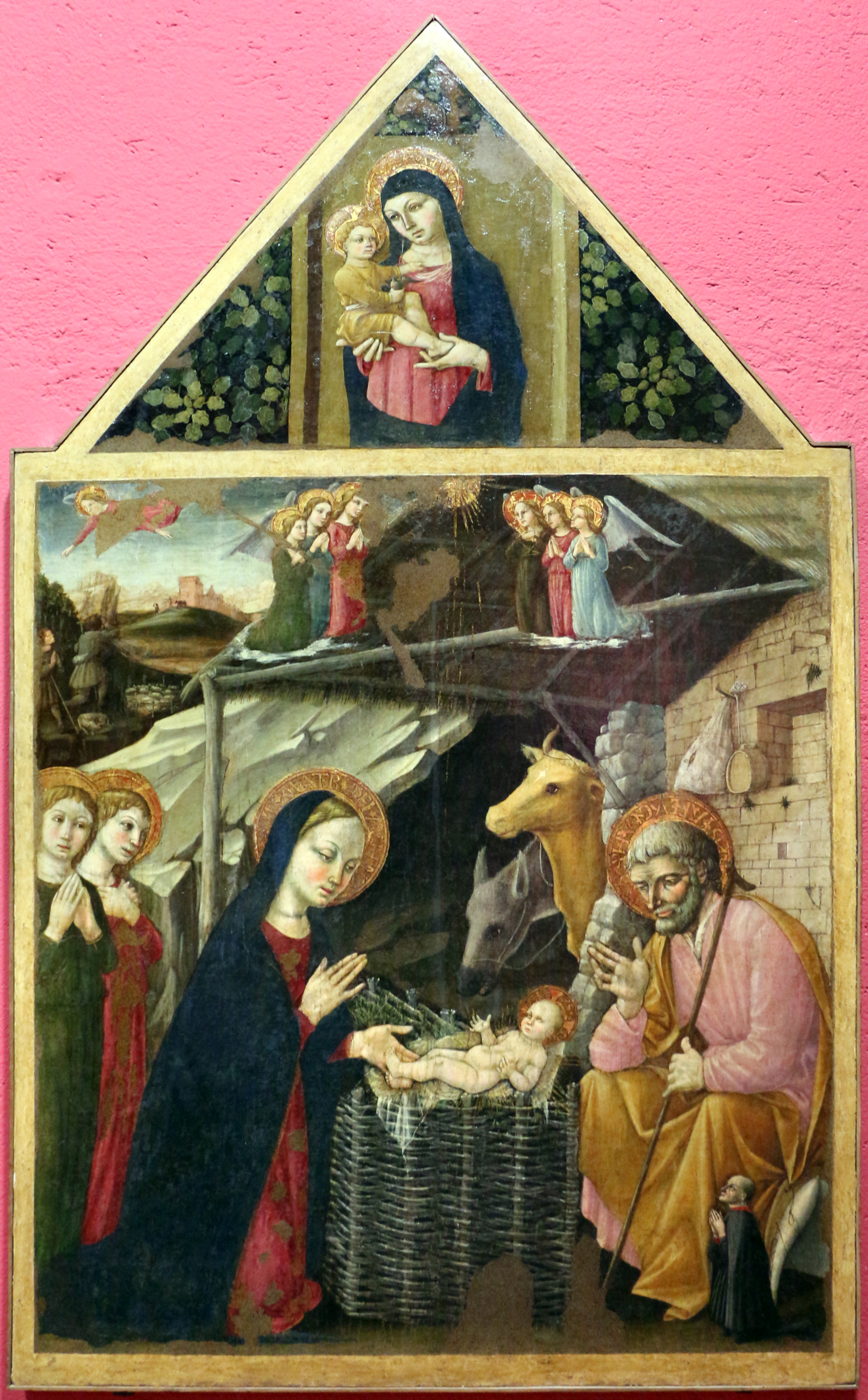
Nativity

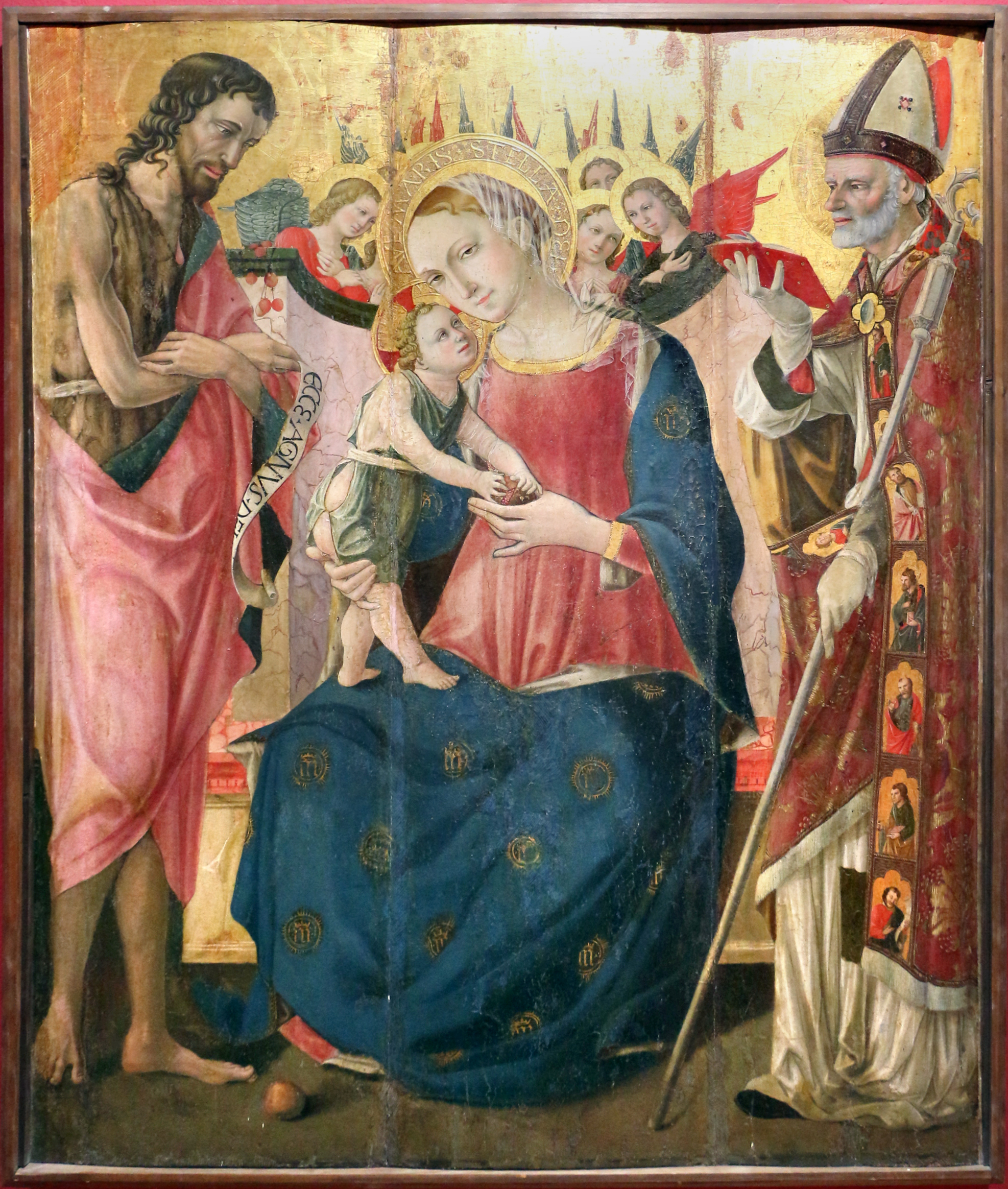
Madonna and Child, Angels and Saints

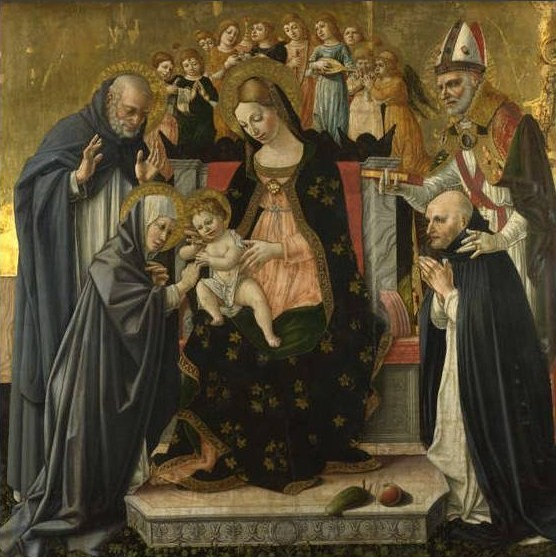
Mystical Wedding of Catherine of Siena
