= Praefectura (Roman settlement) =

Ancient Roman settlement administered by a prefect

Praefectura (plural: praefecturae) was a type of administrative settlement in the Roman Republic and early Roman Empire. It referred to a community lacking independent magistrates or full local autonomy, instead governed by a Roman-appointed official known as a praefectus. Praefecturae represented the lowest civic tier in the Roman municipal hierarchy, below coloniae and municipia.

The term should not be confused with military or provincial prefects, such as those governing Egypt or Judaea, or commanding Roman auxiliary units. In the civic context, a praefectura referred specifically to a local settlement without self-government.

== Definition ==
A praefectura was not a self-governing city but a locality under the jurisdiction of a higher-ranking town, colony, or the city of Rome itself. Its administration was overseen by a prefect, usually selected from among Roman citizens or officials of a nearby municipium. These communities retained their local identity but were denied full legal or civic independence.

== Historical context ==
Praefecturae emerged during Rome’s expansion in Latium and central Italy as a flexible tool for territorial integration. While some Latin towns were granted partial autonomy as municipia or promoted to coloniae, others—especially those that had been disloyal to Rome or lacked sufficient resources—were reduced to praefectura status.

Following the Social War (91–88 BCE) and the gradual extension of Roman citizenship, many praefecturae were elevated to municipia. After the Constitutio Antoniniana of 212 CE granted citizenship to nearly all free inhabitants of the empire, the legal distinction between praefecturae and other civic types largely disappeared.

== Governance ==
Unlike a municipium, which elected its own magistrates such as duumviri and aediles, a praefectura had no independent local senate or electoral rights. Instead, Rome or a supervising municipium would appoint a praefectus to oversee judicial and administrative functions. These officials typically served annual terms.

== Examples ==
- Capua – After siding with Hannibal during the Second Punic War, Capua was stripped of its self-governance and reduced to a praefectura.
- Paestum – A former Greek city, Paestum functioned as a praefectura during the Republican period before later gaining municipium status.
- Several smaller communities in Campania, Latium, and Samnium operated as praefecturae during the 3rd and 2nd centuries BCE.

== Comparison with other settlement types ==
Praefecturae formed the lowest tier in the Roman civic hierarchy:

- Coloniae – Roman or Latin colonies with full or partial rights
- Municipia – Towns with local governance and varying degrees of citizenship
- Praefecturae – Towns under external administration, with no civic autonomy

== Relation to other uses of "prefect" ==
The term praefectura in this civic context is distinct from other Roman uses of praefectus. In the military, prefects commanded auxiliary units or served in logistical roles (see Praefectus). In imperial administration, prefects also governed provinces of special status such as Egypt and Judaea (see Prefecture). In contrast, a civic praefectura was a local settlement in Italy under Roman or colonial oversight.

== See also ==
- Praefectus
- Prefecture
- Colonia (Roman)
- Municipium
- Civitates
