= Lorenzo and Jacopo Salimbeni =

Italian painters

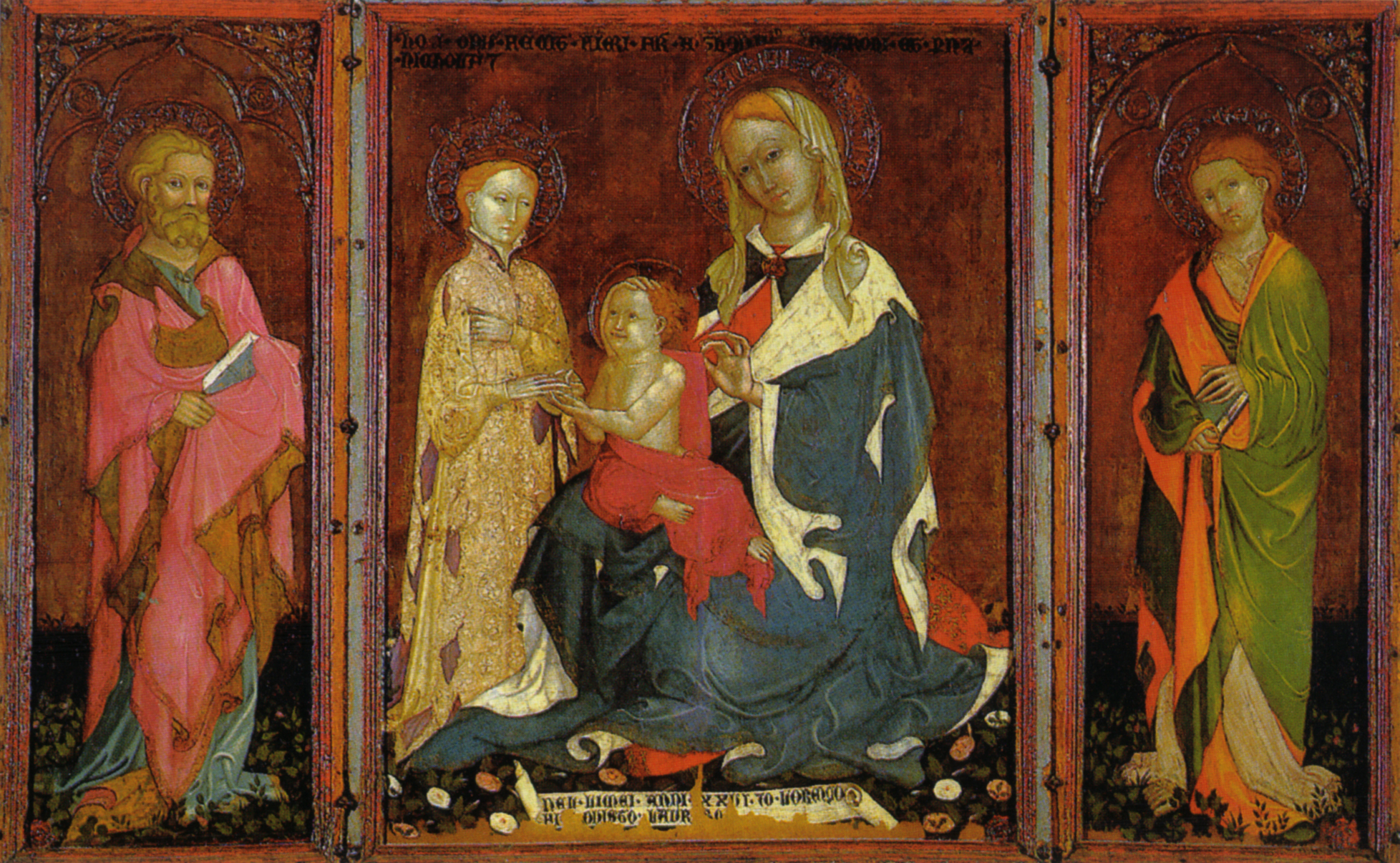
Mystical Marriage of St. Catherine by Lorenzo Salimbeni, Art Gallery of San Severino Marche, 1400

Lorenzo Salimbeni (San Severino Marche, 1374 – c. 1418) and Jacopo Salimbeni (c. 1370/80 – after 1426) were Italian painters. They were brothers whose work spanned both a relatively narrow geographical area and time period, from the triptych painting of the altarpiece of the Mystical Marriage of St Catherine by Lorenzo alone in 1400 (Pinacoteca Civica, San Severino) to the frescoes of the Crucifixion and Scenes from the Life of St John the Baptist in the Oratory of St John the Baptist, Urbino, in 1416. The majority of their work is to be found in churches in and around their home town, San Severino Marche.

== Life ==
Jacopo served as a Councillor of the Commune in San Severino Marche.

== Works ==
Some works are signed by Lorenzo alone; none are undoubtedly ascribable to Jacopo alone. In spite of their production was limited to few provinces of east-central Italy, their stylistic elements are representative of the internationalization of that pictorial language.

The two painters frescoed the Abbey of San Lorenzo in Doliolo, the Church of San Domenico, and the old Cathedral of Saint Maria della Pieve in San Severino.

Some of their paintings are displayed in the Pinacoteca Civica Padre Pietro Tacchi Venturi in San Severino Marche, including the Mystical Marriage of St Catherine by Lorenzo alone in 1400.

Lorenzo and Jacopo painted frescoes of John the Baptist in Urbino in 1416.
