= Fabriano =

- Comune
- Comune di Fabriano
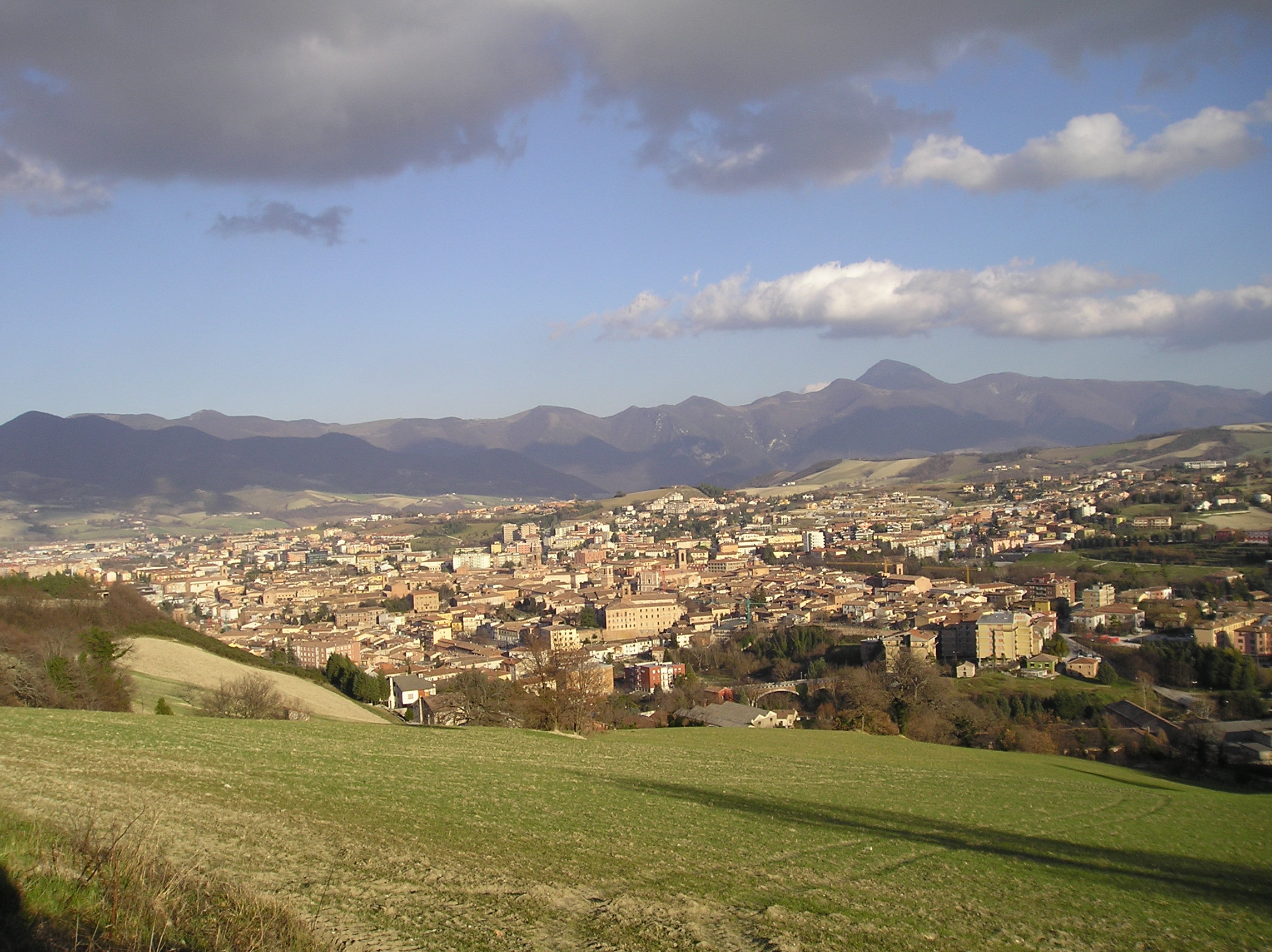

- Coat of arms

- Fabriano within the Province of Ancona

- Location within Italy Location within Marche
- Coordinates: 43°20′N 12°55′E
- Country: Italy
- Region: Marche
- Province: Ancona (AN)
- Frazioni: see list

Government
  - Mayor: Daniela Ghergo

Area
  - Total: 272.08 km^{2} (105.05 sq mi)
- Elevation: 325 m (1,066 ft)

Population (31 December 2017)
  - Total: 30,809
  - Density: 113.24/km^{2} (293.28/sq mi)
- Demonym: Fabrianesi
- Time zone: UTC+1 (CET)
  - Summer (DST): UTC+2 (CEST)
- Postal code: 60044
- Dialing code: 0732
- Patron saint: St. John the Baptist
- Saint day: June 24
- Website: Official website

Fabriano is a town and comune of Ancona province in the Italian region of the Marche, at 325 metres (1,066 ft) above sea level. It lies in the Esino valley 44 kilometres (27 mi) upstream and southwest of Jesi; and 15 kilometres (9 mi) east-northeast of Fossato di Vico and 36 kilometres (22 mi) east of Gubbio (both in Umbria). Its location on the main highway and rail line from Umbria to the Adriatic make it a mid-sized regional center in the Apennines. Fabriano is the headquarters of the giants appliance makers Indesit (now owned by Whirlpool) and Ariston.

Fabriano, with Roma, Parma, Torino and Carrara, is an Italian creative city (UNESCO). The town is in the category Folk Arts and is widely-known for its production of handmade paper.

== History ==
Fabriano appears to have been founded in the early Middle Ages by the inhabitants of a small Roman town 5 kilometres (3 mi) south at Attiggio (Latin Attidium), of which some slight remains and inscriptions are extant. In 1276, Fabriano became one of the earliest places in Europe to produce paper. Since the 13th century and even today, the town has a reputation for fine watermarked paper. This led to Fabriano's prosperity in the Late Middle Ages and the Renaissance, and was also one of the factors that led to the establishment of nearby Foligno in Umbria as one of the earliest printing centers in Italy in the 15th century, from 1470 onwards.

== Geography ==
The municipality borders with Cerreto d'Esi, Costacciaro (PG), Esanatoglia (MC), Fiuminata (MC), Fossato di Vico (PG), Genga, Gualdo Tadino (PG), Matelica (MC), Nocera Umbra (PG), Poggio San Vicino (MC), Sassoferrato, Serra San Quirico and Sigillo (PG).

=== Frazioni ===
The hamlets (frazioni) of Fabriano are:

Albacina, Argignano, Attiggio, Bassano, Bastia, Belvedere, Borgo Tufico, Cacciano, Ca' Maiano, Campodiegoli, Campodonico, Cancelli, Cantia, Castelletta, Ceresola, Ciaramella, Coccore, Collamato, Collegiglioni, Colle Paganello, Cupo, Fontanaldo, Grotte, Marena, Marenella, Marischio, Melano, Moscano, Nebbiano, Paterno, Poggio San Romualdo, Rufano beach, Precicchie, Rocchetta, Rucce, San Donato, San Giovanni, San Michele, San Pietro, Sant'Elia, Serradica, Valgiubbola, Vallemontagnana, Valleremita, Vallina, Varano, Viacce, Vigne.

== Main sights ==
Fabriano's wealth and commitment to the fine arts in the late medieval period have left it with many monuments.

=== Churches ===
- Fabriano Cathedral, dedicated to San Venanzio (Saint Venantius) (14th century, rebuilt in 1607–17). From the Baroque restoration are the stucco decoration of the interior and the canvasses by Gregorio Preti, Salvator Rosa, Giovanni Francesco Guerrieri, Giuseppe Puglia and Orazio Gentileschi. To the original Cathedral belong the polygonal apse, the cloister and the St Lawrence Chapel with frescoes by Allegretto di Nuzio (c. 1360). Also important are the frescoes with Stories of the True Cross by the Folignate painter Giovanni di Corraduccio (1415).
- San Filippo Neri - Church in 14th century attached to hospital, converted to oratory of the Philippines in 1628
- San Domenico
- Santi Biagio e Romualdo
- Sant'Onofrio - Church rebuilt in 1727
- The Benedictine Abbey
- St Augustine
- Santa Caterina da Siena - Present church erected 1508
- Collegiata of St. Nicholas
- Santa Maria del Piangato
- St Benedict
- Oratory of the Gonfalone

=== Other buildings ===
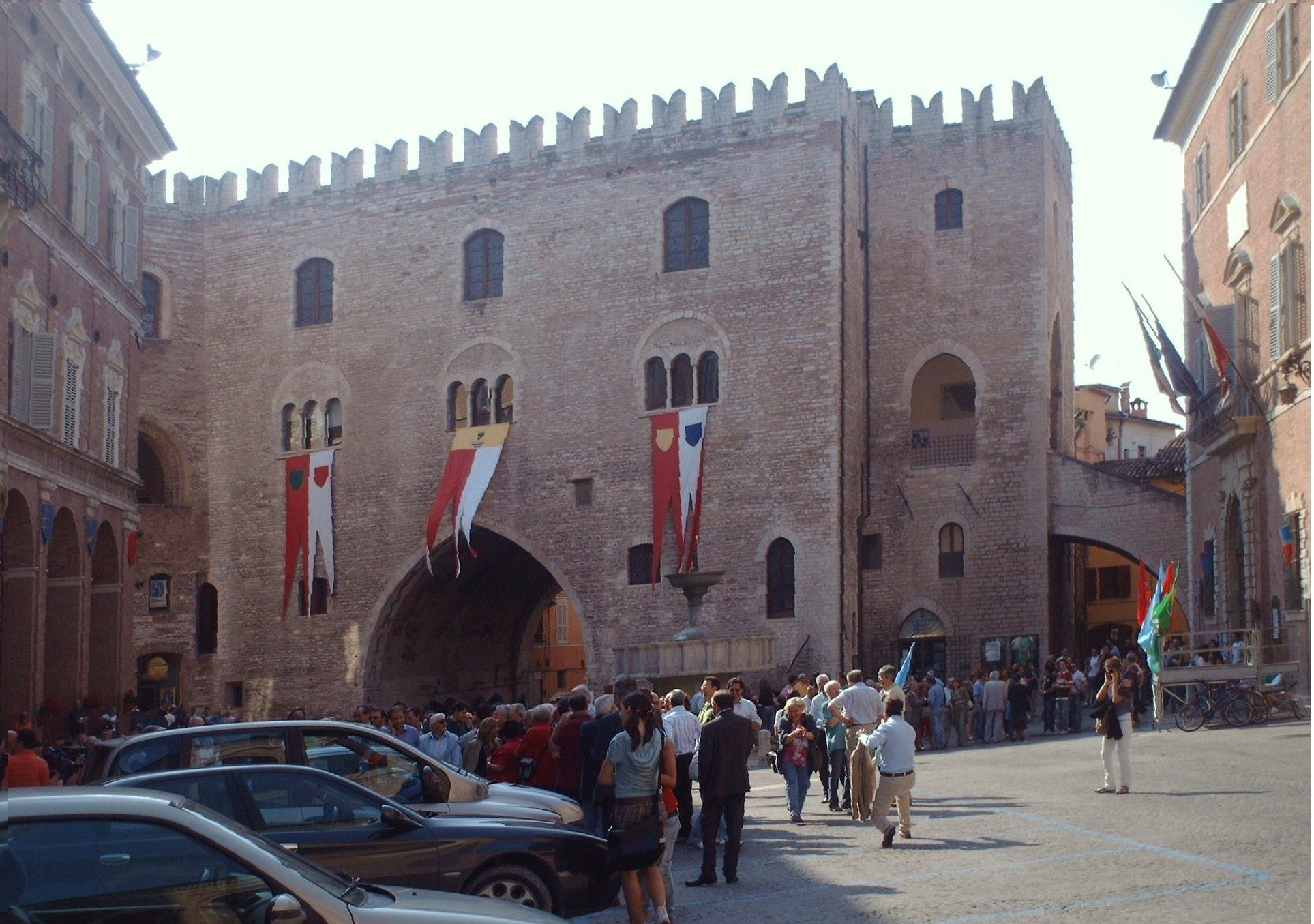
Palazzo del Podestà.

- Palazzo del Podestà (1255) built in white stone from Vallemontagnana and subsequently modified several times. It has a distinctive bridge structure, a memory of the stream which once flowed under it. The central arcade has frescoes from the 13th-14th centuries portraying warriors, and an enigmatic Wheel of Fortune moved by a feminine figure.
- Sturinalto Fountain (1285), designed by Jacopo di Grondolo, who was inspired by the Fontana Maggiore in Perugia.
- Communal Palace (c. 1350, rebuilt in 1690). It was the residence of the Chiavelli family, lords of the city until 1435. In the courtyard is a lapidarium with fragments of buildings of the ancient Roman cities of Attidium (Attiggio), Tuficum (Borgo Tufico) and Sentinum (Sassoferrato).
- Pinacoteca Civica Bruno Malajoli displayed in the former Hospital (Spedale di Santa Maria del Buon Gesù) - The hospital was first built in 1456. The art collection of the Pinacoteca were moved here in 1994. The collection contains works by Rainaldetto di Ranuccio of Spoleto, Master of San Agostino, Master of San Emiliano, Master of the Magi (Fra Giovanni di Bartolomeo), Maestro dei Beati Becchetti, Puccio di Simone, Allegretto Nuzi, Francescuccio di Cecco Ghissi, Master of Fossato, Master of San Verecondo, Ottaviano Nelli, Master of Staffolo, Antonio da Fabriano, Bicci di Lorenzo, Neri di Bicci; Bernardino di Mariotto, Filippo da Verona, Venanzio da Camerino and Piergentile da Matelica, Simone de Magistris, Domiziano Domiziani, Girolamo or Giacomo Nardini, Andrea Boscoli, Orazio Gentileschi, Ambrogio Monaco, Francesco Podesti, and Gentile da Fabriano.
- Loggiato of St. Francis (c. 1450)
- Vasari Portico (1316)
- Paper and Watermark Museum Fabriano
- Villa Marchese del Grillo

== Notable people ==
- Totila, penultimate king of the Ostrogoths, suffered his defeat at Taginae near Fabriano on 1 July 552 AD
- Gentile da Fabriano, 15th-century painter, whose most famous work, an oil painting of the Epiphany, is in the Uffizi Gallery in Florence
- Saint John dal Bastone 12th-century Silvestrine monk, born in Paterno
- Francesco Stelluti, co-founder of the Accademia dei Lincei, born in Fabriano in 1577
- Luigi Fabbri (1877–1935), anarchist writer, teacher, and activist, born in Fabriano and a leading figure in the Italian anarchist movement alongside Errico Malatesta
- Jessica Rizzo (born 1965), pornographic actress and businesswoman
- Giorgia Cardinaletti (born 1987), journalist and television presenter

== See also ==
- Archivio storico delle Cartiere Miliani Fabriano
- Cartiere Miliani Fabriano
- Cassa di Risparmio di Fabriano e Cupramontana
- Elica
- Fabriano Basket
- Roman Catholic Diocese of Fabriano-Matelica
