= Apulia (disambiguation) =

Apulia is a region of southern Italy.

Apulia may also refer to:

- Apulia, part of several historic regions known as Apulia and Calabria
- Apulia (microcontinent), a small tectonic plate
- Apúlia, a town in Portugal
- Apulia (leafhopper) Distant, 1908, a genus in the tribe Cicadellini

== See also ==
- Puglia (disambiguation)
- Apulians (disambiguation)
- Apulia Station, New York
