= Puccio di Simone =

Italian Gothic painter

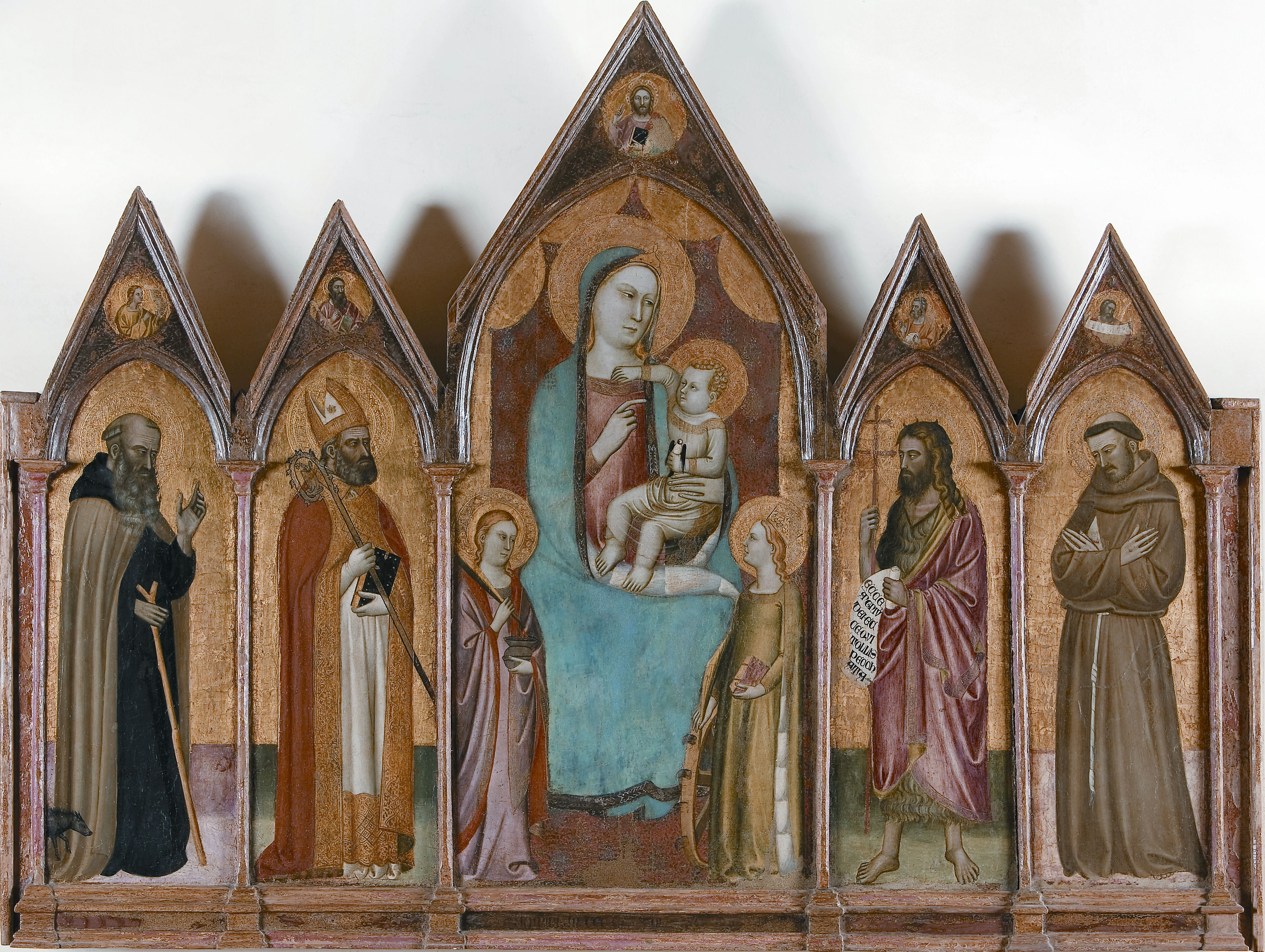
Polittico with Madonna and Saints, Certaldo, Museum of Sacred Art

Puccio di Simone (fl. 1346–1358) was an Italian Gothic painter, active in Florence.

== Biography ==
Puccio di Simone is also known as the Master of the Fabriano Altarpiece. He was a student of Bernardo Daddi in Florence. He is mentioned between 1348 and 1357. He appears to have collaborated with Allegretto Nuzi in Fabriano.

== Work ==
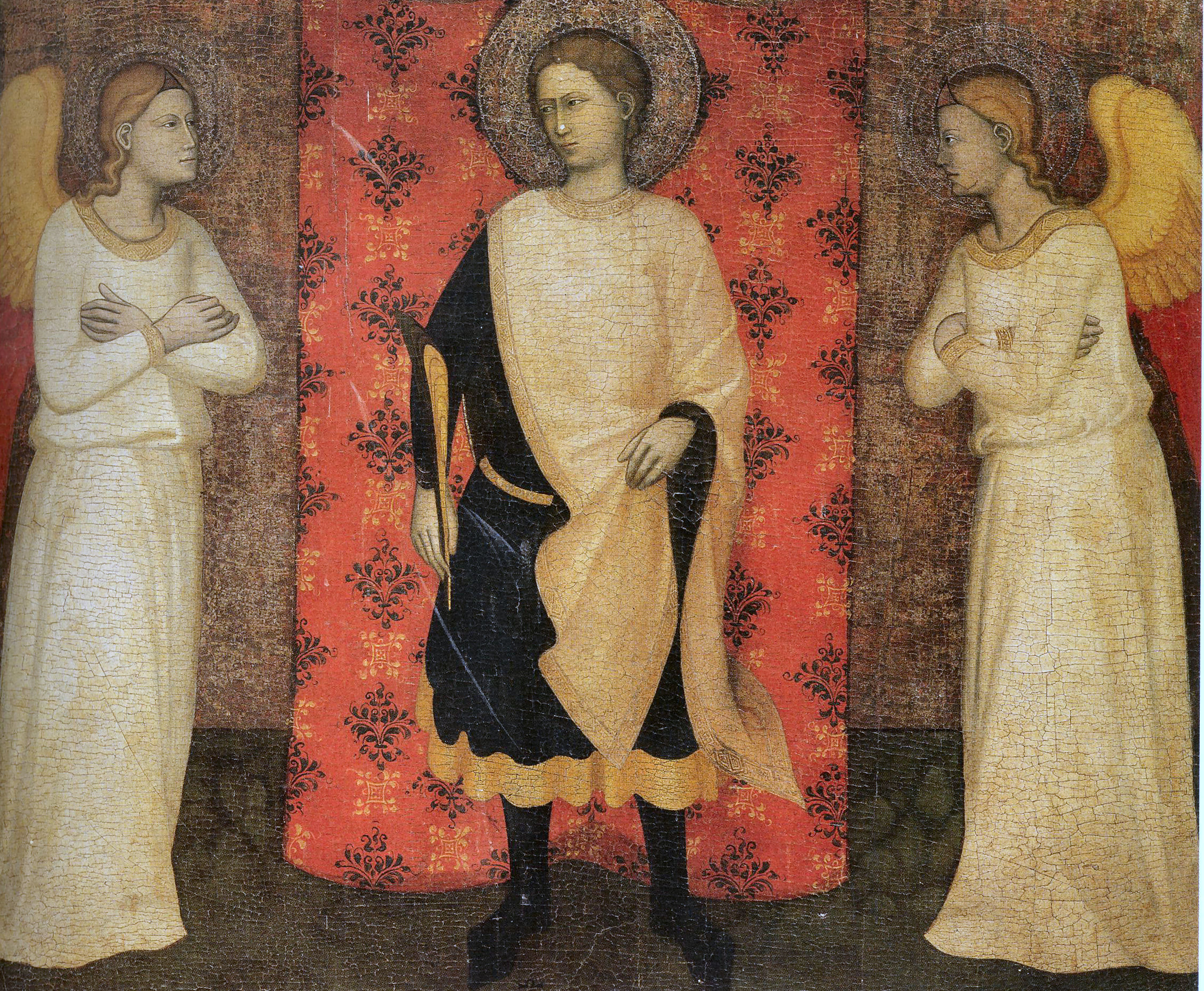
Saint Ansano and two angels

Work by Puccio di Simone can be found in:

- Coronation of the Virgin, Museum of Fine Arts, Ghent, Belgium
- Madonna, Petit Palais, Avignon, France
- Madonna and Child, Montor Collection, Paris, France
- Madonna and Saints (polyptych), Museum of Sacred Art, Certaldo, Italy
- St Anthony altarpiece (1353), Pinacoteca of Fabriano, Italy
- Triptych of Madonna with Saints Laurentius, Onuphrius, Jacobus and Barthomoleus, Accademia, Florence, Italy
- Saints Lucia and Catherine, Galleria di Palazzo degli Alberti, Prato, Italy
- St Ansano and two angels, Church of Saint Giovanni Battista and Saint Ansano, Vinci, Italy
- Madonna with angels and saints, National Gallery of Art Washington D.C., USA
- St James Major, Seattle Art Museum Seattle, Washington, USA
- Crucifixion, Snite Museum of Art, University of Notre Dame, Notre Dame, Indiana, USA
- Adoration of the Kings, Worcester Art Museum, Massachusetts, USA
- The Last Supper, Upton House, Warwickshire, United Kingdom
