= Fabriano–Urbino railway =

Overview
- Native name: Ferrovia Urbino–Fabriano
- Locale: Marche, Italy
- Termini: Fabriano; Urbino

History
- Opened: 28 April 1895

Technical
- Line length: 79.359 km (49.311 mi)
- Track gauge: 1,435 mm (4 ft 8 1/2 in)

The Fabriano–Urbino railway (Italian: Ferrovia Urbino-Fabriano) is a partially abandoned rail line in Italy in Marche, which connected Urbino and Fabriano.

== History ==
Despite good intentions, work began late and the first section was opened on 28 April 1895 between Fabriano and Pergola, while Urbino was reached three years later, on 20 September 1898.

From 13 November 2013 the railway service on the Pergola-Fabriano route was suspended due to a small washout of the ballast at km 22, caused by the flooding of a stream following a wave of bad weather.

The tracks and technological systems of the line were removed in 1971.
