= Master of Staffolo =

Italian painter

The Master of Staffolo (active 1420–1460) was an anonymous late-Gothic style painter active in the region of Marche and Umbria.

He appears to have been influenced by Gentile da Fabriano, the brothers Salimbeni of San Severino Marche, and Bartolomeo di Tommaso of Foligno.

Attributed to this painter are many works including:

- Painting for Sant'Egidio, Staffolo
- Painting for Convent of the Beata Mattia in Matelica
- Painting at Museo nazionale di Palazzo Venezia, Rome
- Painting for Sacro Convento, Museo del Tesoro, Assisi
- Painting at Galleria Rob Smeets, Milan
- Four half-figures in fresco: Saints Mary Magdalen, John the Baptist, Venanzio, andAnthony of Padua, for Fabriano Cathedral
- San Bernardino da Siena, San Giovanni da Capestrano and two St Sebastians, Palazzo Vescovile, Fabriano
- Madonna and Child with San Bernardino da Siena, Oratory of Santa Maria del Buon Gesù, Fabriano
- Frescoes in the lunettes and lateral niches in the entrance portal of the Pinacoteca Civica, Fabriano
- Madonna di Loreto, atrium of Palazzo Baravelli in piazza Miliani
- Triptych Enthroned Madonna and Child with Saints Venanzio, Mariano, and Albacina, Parish church of Fabriano
- Pietà and St Giacomo della Marca, St Bernardino da Siena; Sant'Onofrio, Fabriano
- Virgin adoring Child, l'Eterno, with St John the Baptist and Catherine of Alexandria, Pinacoteca Civica di Fabriano
