= Pulia =

Pulia may be:

- an alternative spelling of Pulyeh, a village in Iran
- a misspelling of Puglia

== See also ==
- Pulya, a 1999 Russian ska-punk album
