= Puglia (disambiguation) =

Puglia is the Italian name for Apulia, a historical and administrative region of Southern Italy.

Puglia may also refer to:

== People ==
- Giuseppe Puglia (1600–1636), an Italian painter
- Nareshkumar Chunnalal Puglia (born 1948), an Indian politician
- Frank Puglia (1892–1975), an Italian film actor
- Marianne Puglia, a Venezuelan Miss Earth
- Sergio Puglia (born 1950), Uruguayan chef and television personality
- Busa of Canosa di Puglia, an Apulian noblewoman of the 3rd century BC

== Other ==
- Puglia Channel, an Italian television station
- Giro di Puglia, a cycling race in Apulia
- Gentile di Puglia, a breed of sheep
- Italian cruiser Puglia, a warship of the Royal Italian Navy

== See also ==
- Apulia (disambiguation)
- Pulia (disambiguation)
