= Francescuccio Ghissi =

Italian painter

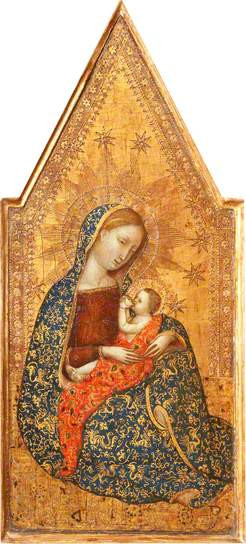
The Madonna of Humility (triptych, centre panel) by Francescuccio Ghissi National Trust, Polesden Lacey

Francescuccio Ghissi, also called Francesco di Cecco Ghissi, (fl. 1359 – 1395) was an Italian painter. His exact date of birth and death are not known.

Ghissi was an exponent of the Gothic style, active especially in the Marche region of central-eastern Italy. He is known to have worked with Allegretto Nuzi. He primarily painted religious works for church commissions, but little is known about his activities and works except for the Madonna of Humility, part of a triptych he painted, which now resides as part of the Polesden Lacey National Trust collection. He also has works on display in the Pinacoteca Civica of Fabriano, and painted for the Cathedral of Fabriano. Other paintings are present in Ascoli Piceno (Church of Sant'Agostino), Montegiorgio (Church of Sant'Andrea), and the Pinacoteca of Fermo.

Ghissi also painted the St. John altarpiece, made up of nine different paintings. The centre one depicts the Crucifixion, while the eight surrounding it depict stories from the life of St. John the Evangelist. These paintings were sawed apart and separated during the 19th or early 20th century to be sold, and have recently been reunited.
