= Onofrio del Grillo =

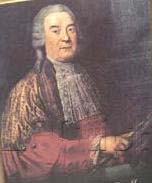

Marquess of Santa Cristina
- Predecessor: Title established
- Successor: Augusto Scarlatti del Grillo
- Born: 5 May 1714; Fabriano
- Died: 6 January 1787 (aged 72); Fabriano
- Burial: Fabriano Cathedral
- Spouse: Faustina Capranica
- House: Grillo
- Father: Bernardo Giacinto del Grillo
- Mother: Maria Virginia Possenti

Onofrio del Grillo (5 May 1714 – 6 January 1787) was an Italian papal nobleman, Marquess of Santa Cristina (Gubbio) and Count of Portule.

He was born to a noble family of Genoese origin, which subsequently transferred to Florence and finally to Fabriano. He spent most of his life in Rome, where he held the roles of Sediario and Chamberlain of the Sword and Cape, among others.

== Biography ==
Onofrio del Grillo was born in Fabriano to a cadet branch of House Grillo, to which Pope Clement X had granted, in 1678, the titles of Marquess and Count. He was the firstborn of Bernardo Giacinto and Maria Virginia Possenti. At the time, the titles of the house were held by his cousin once removed Bernardo II, who lived in Rome, and who induced him to study jurisprudence at the University of Urbino, where he graduated. The death of his mother and his poor economic situation forced a young Onofrio to move in with Bernardo II, at his house in Rome at the foot of Quirinal Hill.

In 1757, Bernardo II died, and Onofrio, who he had appointed as his sole heir, inherited all of his assets and titles. Onofrio's economic situation subsequently improved, but not decisively, as the assets he had inherited were burdened by a series of obligations, which were finally annulled four years later in 1761 by Pope Clement XIII. Becoming part of the Roman patriciate, he was admitted to the Pontifical Court, where he initially served as a sediario. He quickly gained a reputation for his eccentric personality and elaborate pranks and jokes, and became a household name throughout Rome, though it is probable the extent of his antics was exaggerated, being a conflation of various members of his family.

Onofrio briefly became involved in the political affairs of Rome, but soon after had to leave the city for close to a decade, likely due to economic problems tied to Bernardo II's inheritance. He returned in 1771, and was named Prior of the Caporioni, a highly prestigious position at the time. Two years later he became a Conservatore of Rome, during a period of sede vacante between the pontificates of Clement XIV and Pius VI, and used his power to increase taxation on the Roman Ghetto, resulting in widespread protests from Jewish residents that eventually led to his removal from the role. He nonetheless maintained positive relations with Pius VI, who named him Chamberlain of the Sword and Cape.

When he reached old age, Onofrio retired to his hometown of Fabriano, in a large villa he had bought and restored in 1771, where he spent his final years. He died on January 6, 1787, and was buried in the town's cathedral.

== In fiction ==
Onofrio del Grillo, played by Alberto Sordi, is the protagonist of Marco Monicelli's 1981 comedy film Il Marchese del Grillo, in which he is a goofy and eccentric nobleman who enjoys playing pranks on anyone, even Pius VII himself, without caring for potential consequences. It is worth noting that the real Onofrio died more than 20 years prior to the film's setting.
