= Villa Marchese del Grillo =

Palace in Ancona, Marche, Italy

Coordinates: 43.3479561°N 12.9628865°E

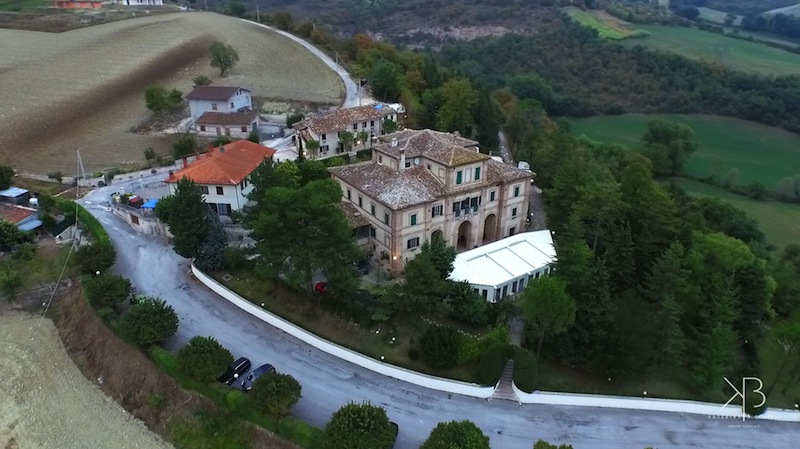
Aerial view from the southwest

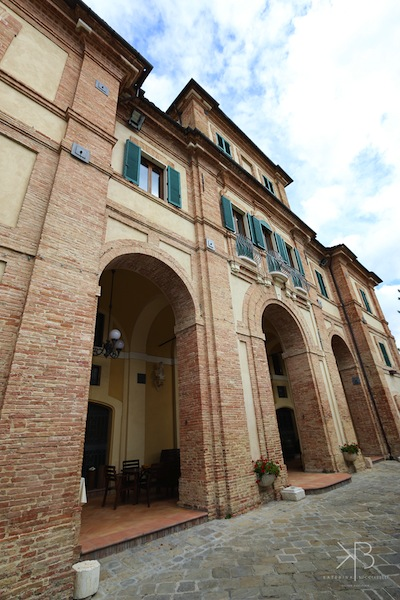
South entry

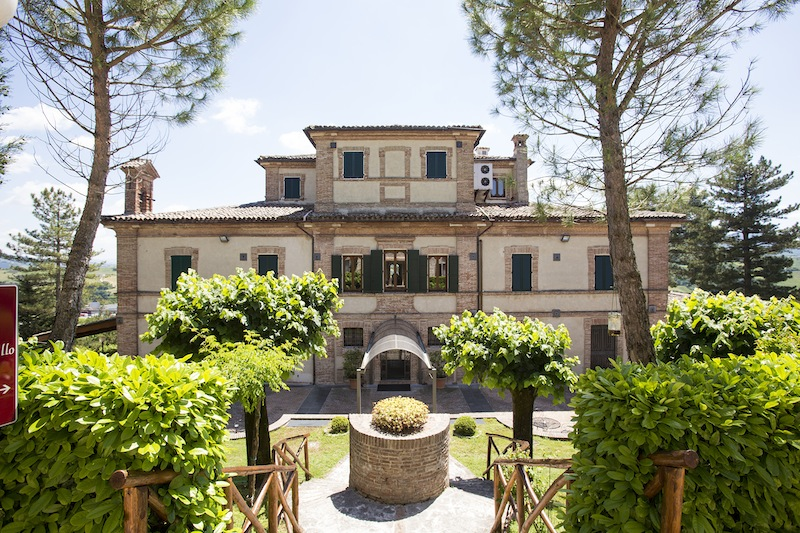
North entry

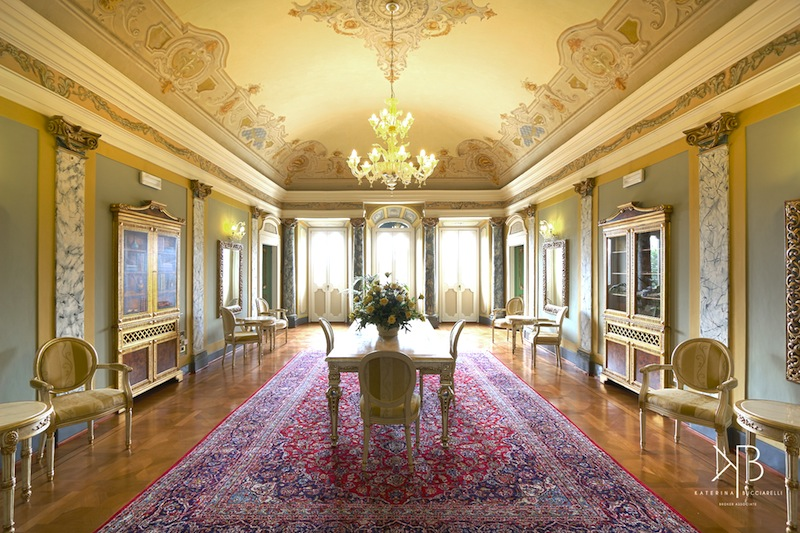
Alberto Sordi Great Room

The Villa Marchese del Grillo, also known as the "100 Windows Villa," is a four-story palace located about 5 kilometres (3.1 mi) east of Fabriano in the Province of Ancona, Marche, Italy. Built in 1771 by the Marchese Onofrio del Grillo, the villa is considered to be an iconic landmark in Italy because of its history.

The palace is surrounded by a 4-hectare (9.9-acre) park full of centuries-old linden trees. One wing of the villa contains a chapel. A second building to the north, called the Locanda (the former "Guardian House of the Marchese"), houses a restaurant.

== History ==
The Marchese Onofrio del Grillo was born in Fabriano in 1714. After studying in Urbino, he was a dignitary at the papal court in Rome, also holding the titles of Marquis of Santa Cristina, and Count of Portula. Word of his colossal jokes and eccentric character spread throughout the world, making him a legend.

In 1771, the marchese built the Villa Marchese del Grillo in a style reminiscent of the historic Marchigiani villas.

In recent times, after years of restoration, this landmark villa became known as The Pearl of Central Italy, for its history, lavish fabrics, antique furniture, and artistic conception.

== Design ==
The exterior pavement is of sandstone on the terrace of the south entrance of the villa, and of brick and Serena stone on the patio of the north entrance.

The villa's elliptical staircase is made of brick embellished with fake marble decorations. The staircase starts on the ground floor, with two identical flights to the principal, or noble, floor above. The lighting is enhanced by Swarovski crystals. A modern elevator has been installed in the left wing of the palace, running from the ground floor to the top floor.

The Great Room of the Villa was named after Alberto Sordi for his starring role in the movie Il Marchese del Grillo, which was filmed at the villa. Currently, this salon is used only for exclusive events.

The three suites located on the noble floor are entered through the "noble doors", made of Italian walnut wood embellished with 24-carat gold leaf, found at each corner of the floor. The suites, decorated with stucco, are named Marchese Del Grillo Suite, Duca Suite, and Contessa Suite, and are designed to reflect each of those personalities. In the master bathroom of the Marchese Del Grillo Suite stand four wardrobes that represent the four seasons. There is one faux double door through which the Marchese's lovers could escape by a secret passageway, which is currently closed for security purposes.

== Chapel ==
The Chapel was built in 1771 and is attached to the right wing of the villa with an entrance from the north side. The marchese used to enjoy Papal Mass from a private balcony that connected the chapel with his suite on the noble floor. Because of his close ties to the Vatican and the Pope, the chapel contains a remarkable collection of Christian relics, such as those of Saint Potenziana, Saint Ruffina, and Saint Vincenzo Martire. The final resting place of St. August was also there. He was found hidden behind the wall, preserved from the German invasion.

The chapel is now decorated in the Art Nouveau style with an embossed floral pattern in the ceiling decorations. In the center of the ceiling there is a special design depicting a sun interposed by a dove, a symbol of the peace that comes after the dawn. Two wooden statues in black and white, made from the wood of centuries-old park plants cut to a thickness of 3–4 centimetres (1.2–1.6 in), give a sense of grandeur. The chapel is currently used primarily for private events.

== Eco-sustainable landmark ==
Villa Marchese Del Grillo has been updated to use renewable energy and to specially treat their hazardous waste. In 2015, a wood chip boiler was installed to warm the rooms and produce hot water, generating savings on annual heating costs of up to 75%. Furthermore, all windows have been replaced to meet new energy-saving standards.

== Gallery ==
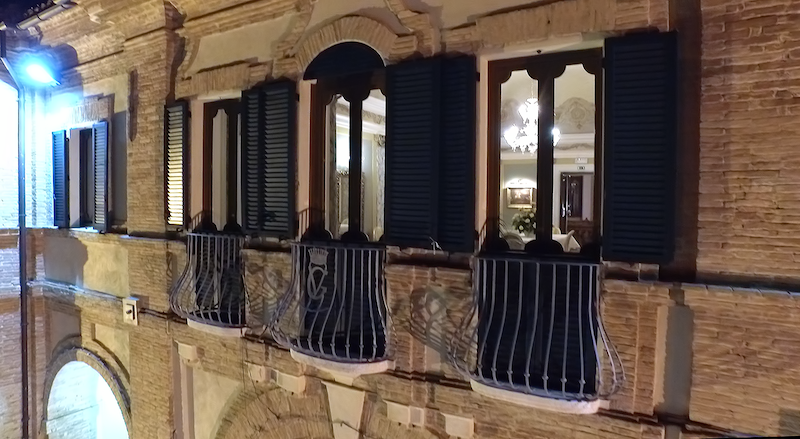

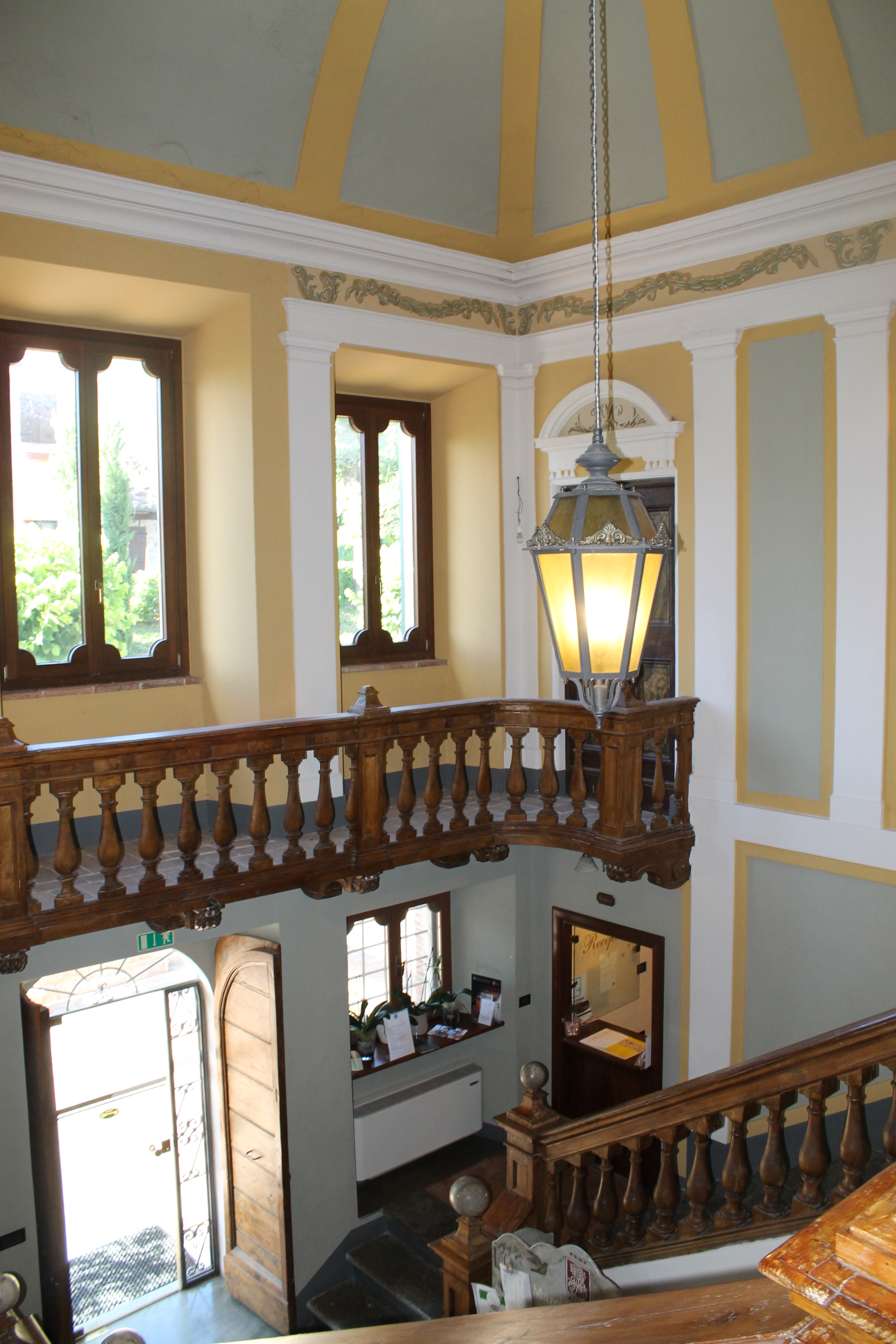

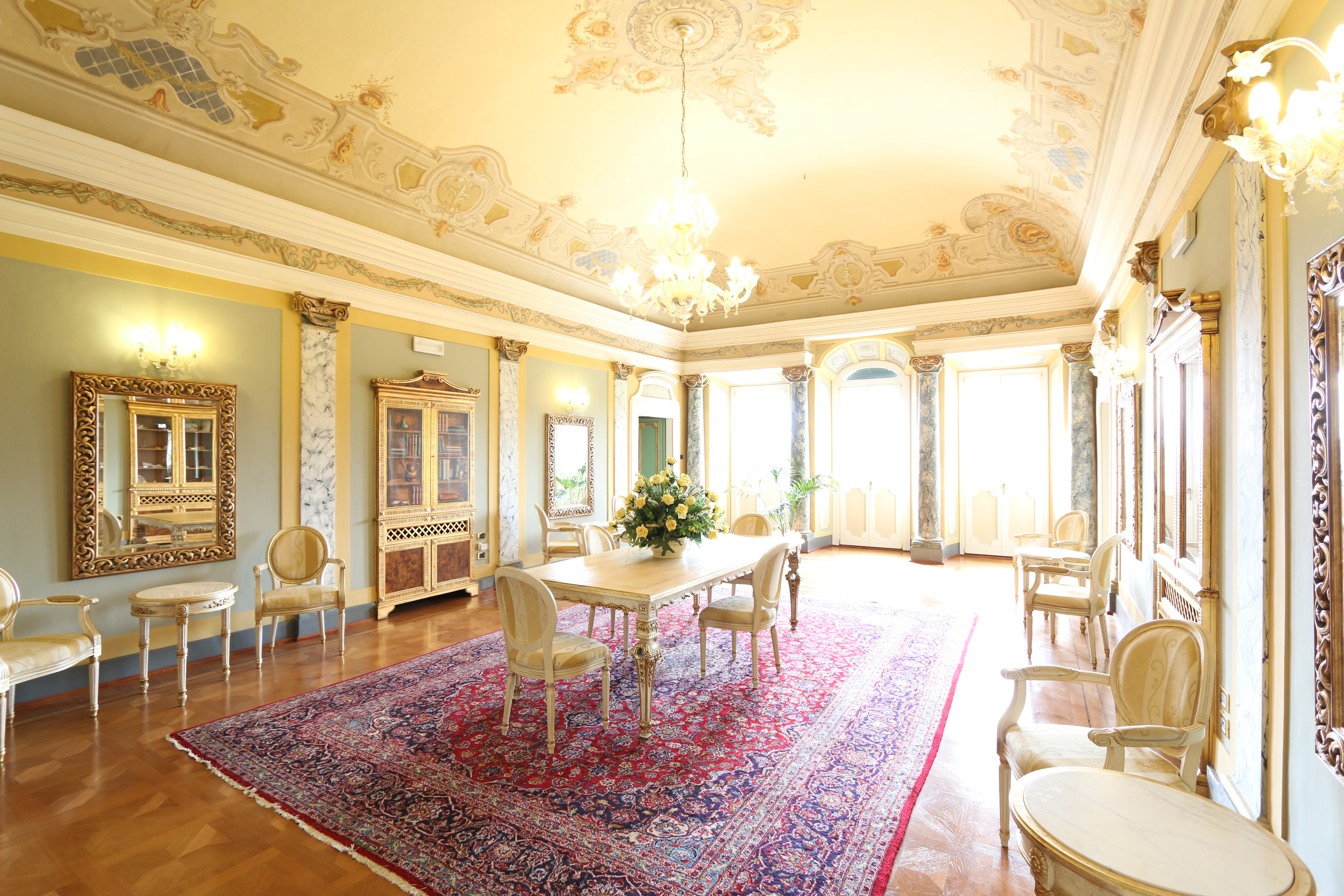

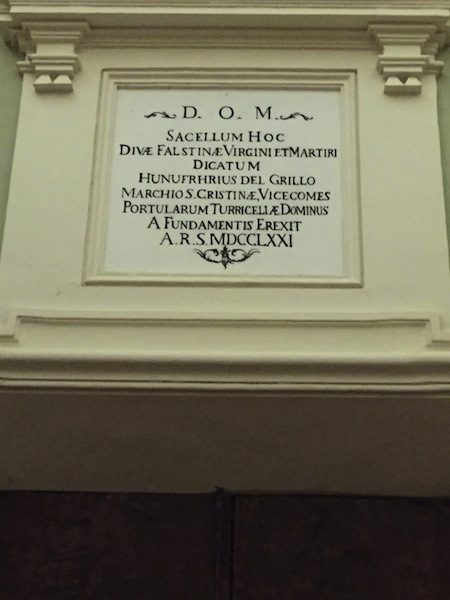

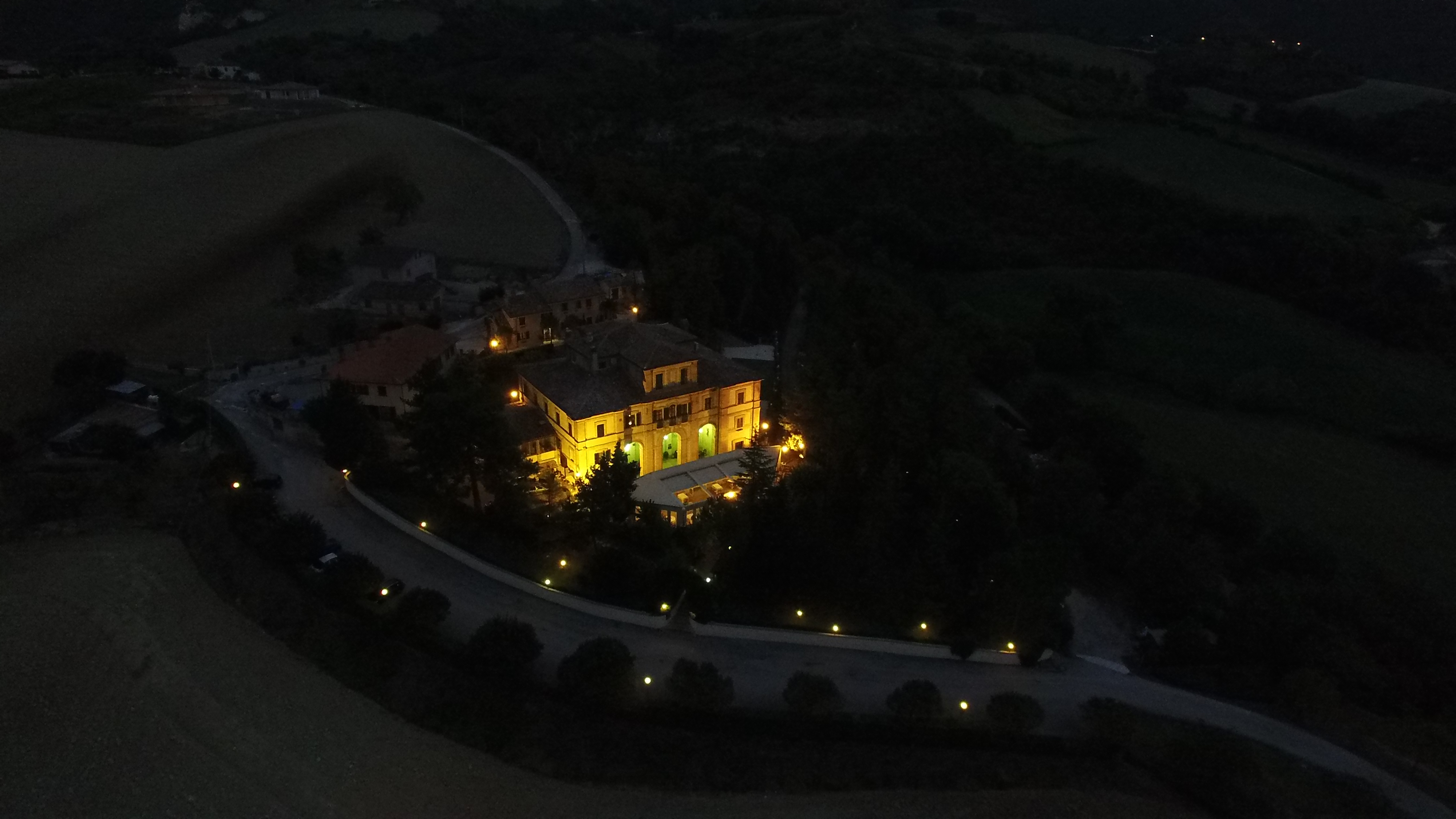

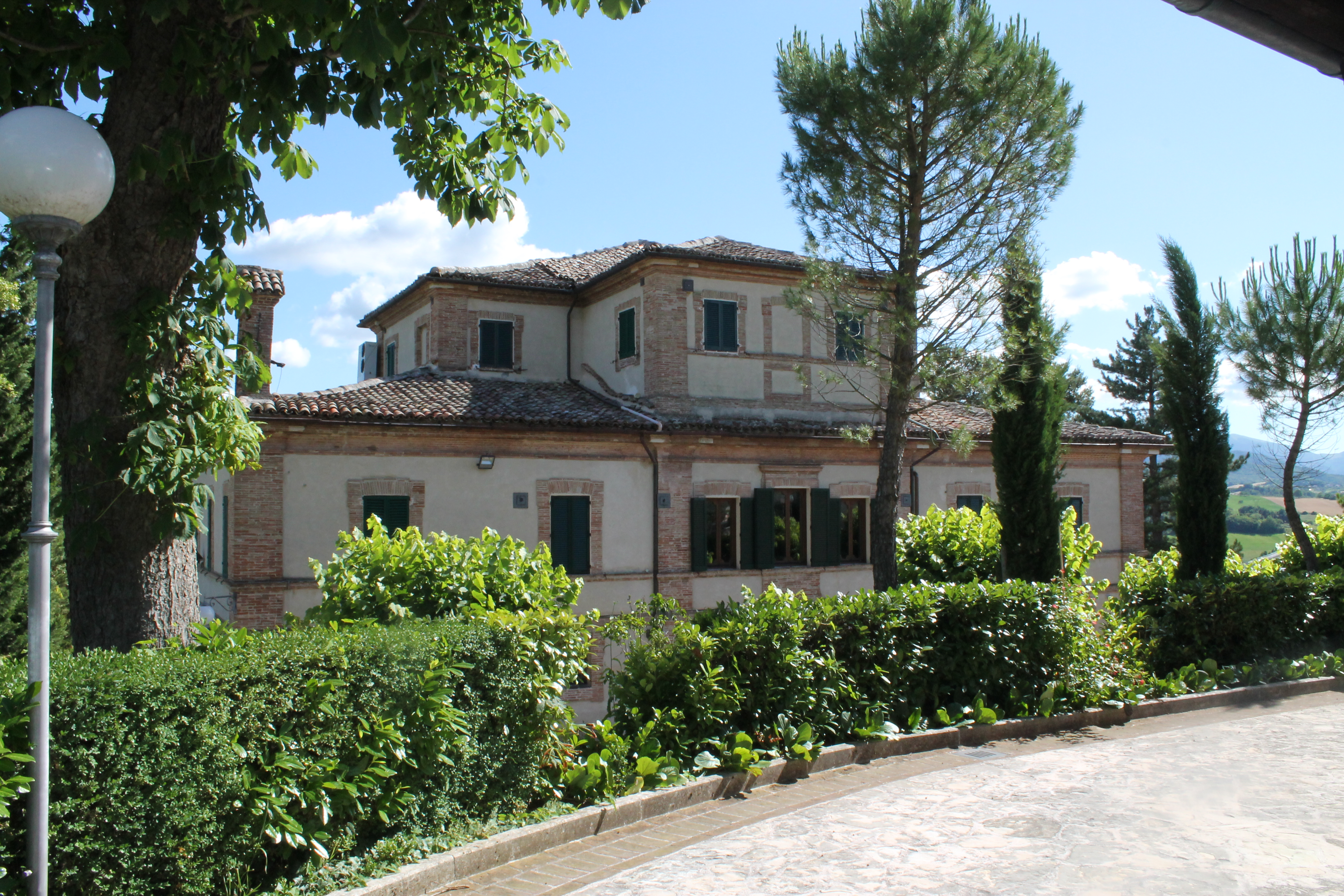

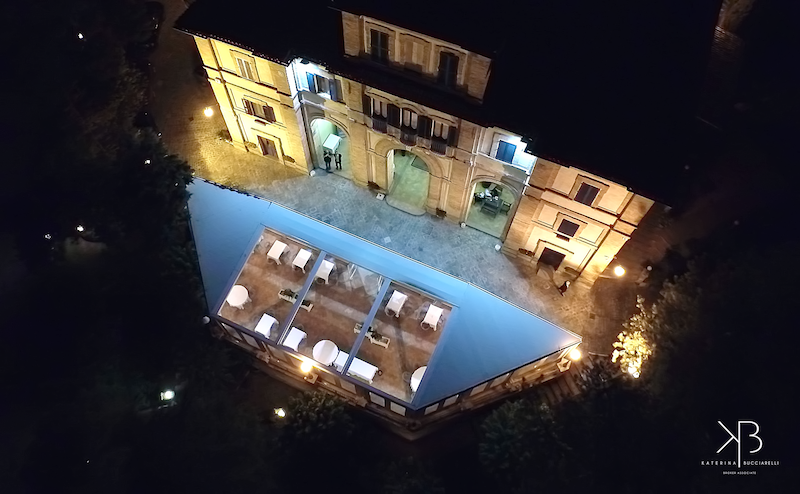

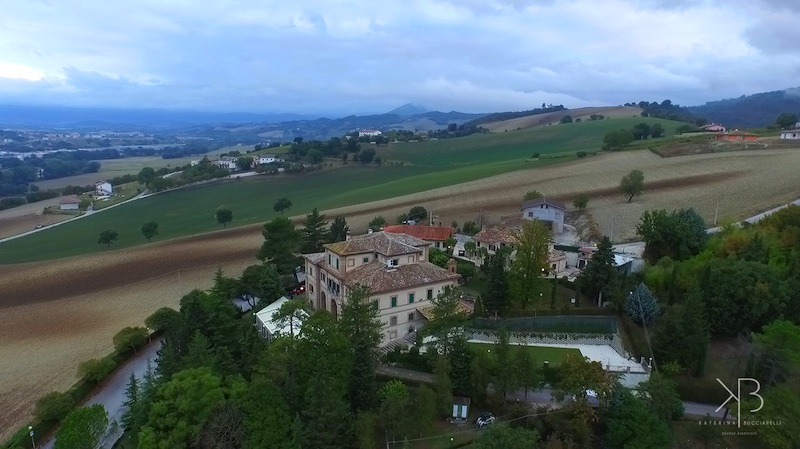

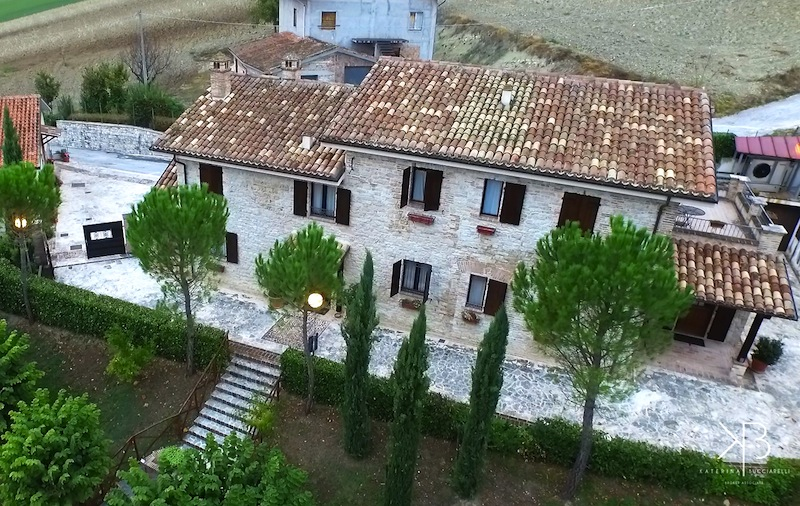
Locanda Marchese Del Grillo

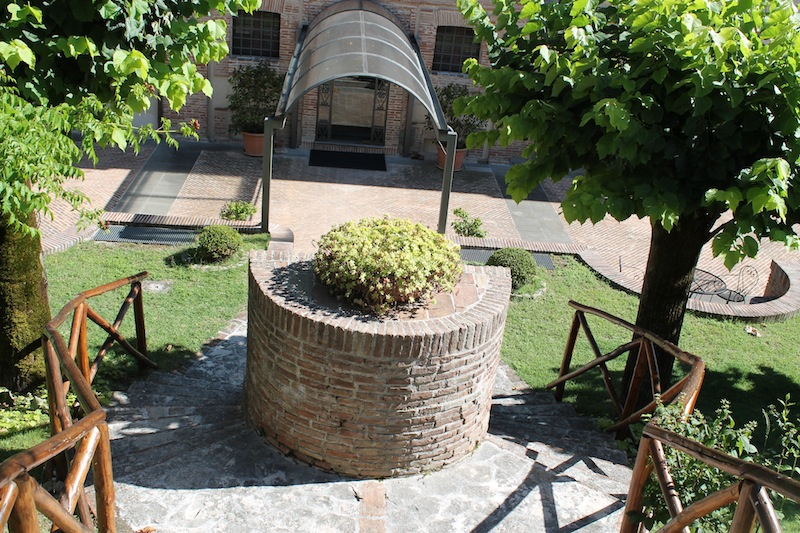
Garden of the Villa (North Side)

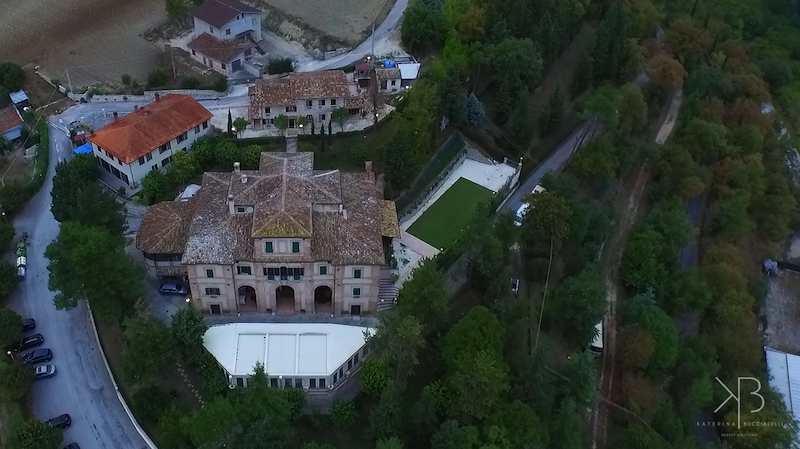

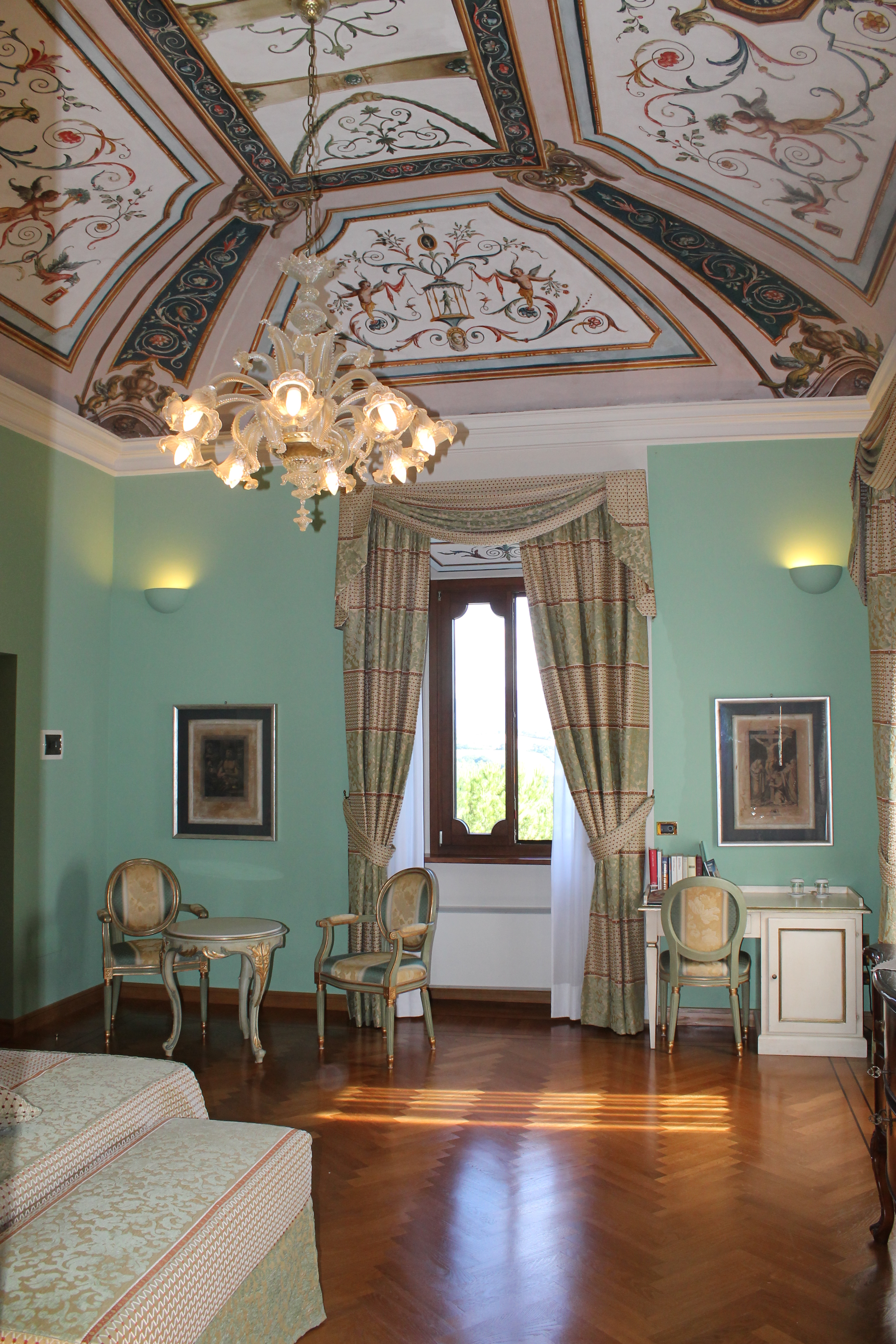

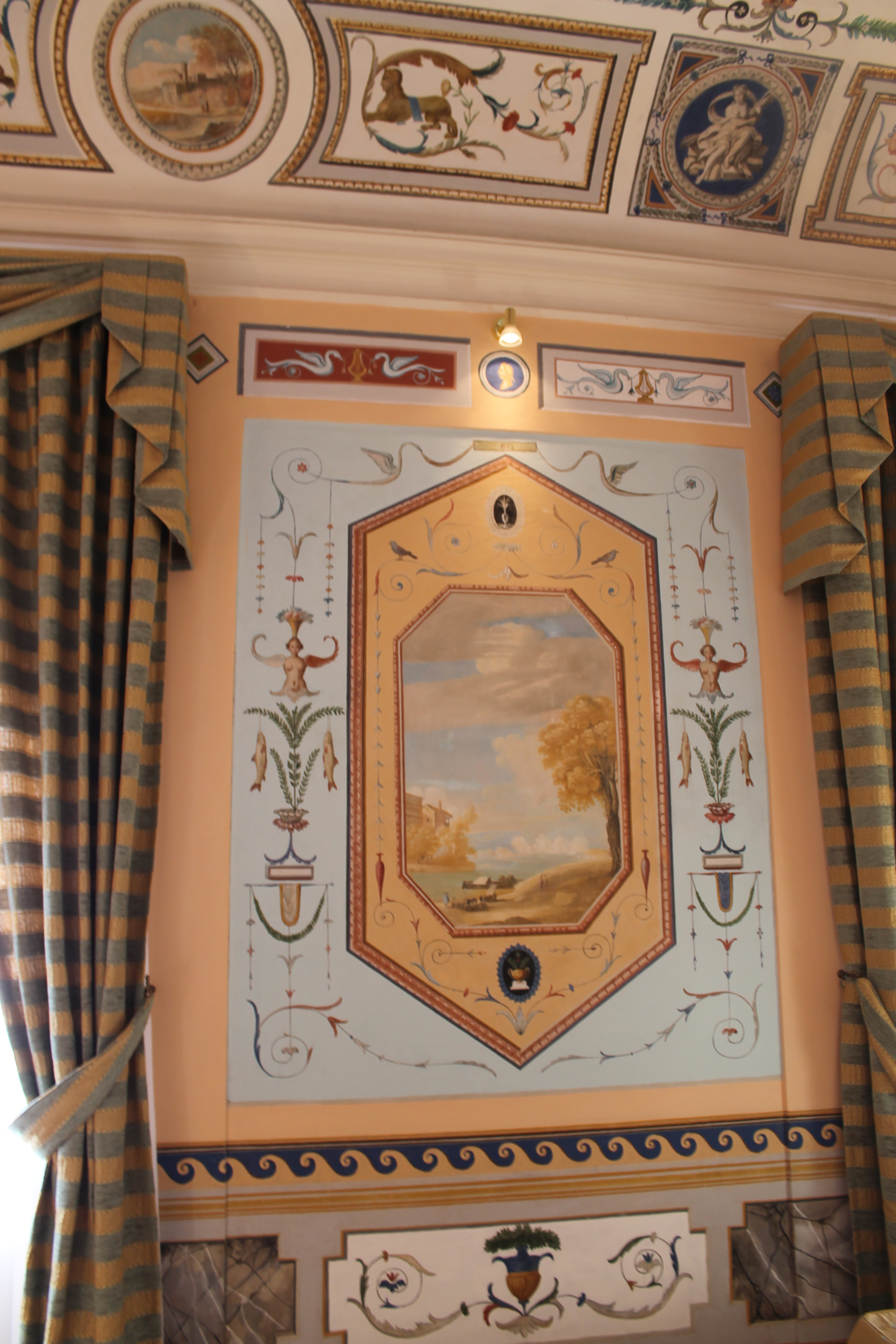

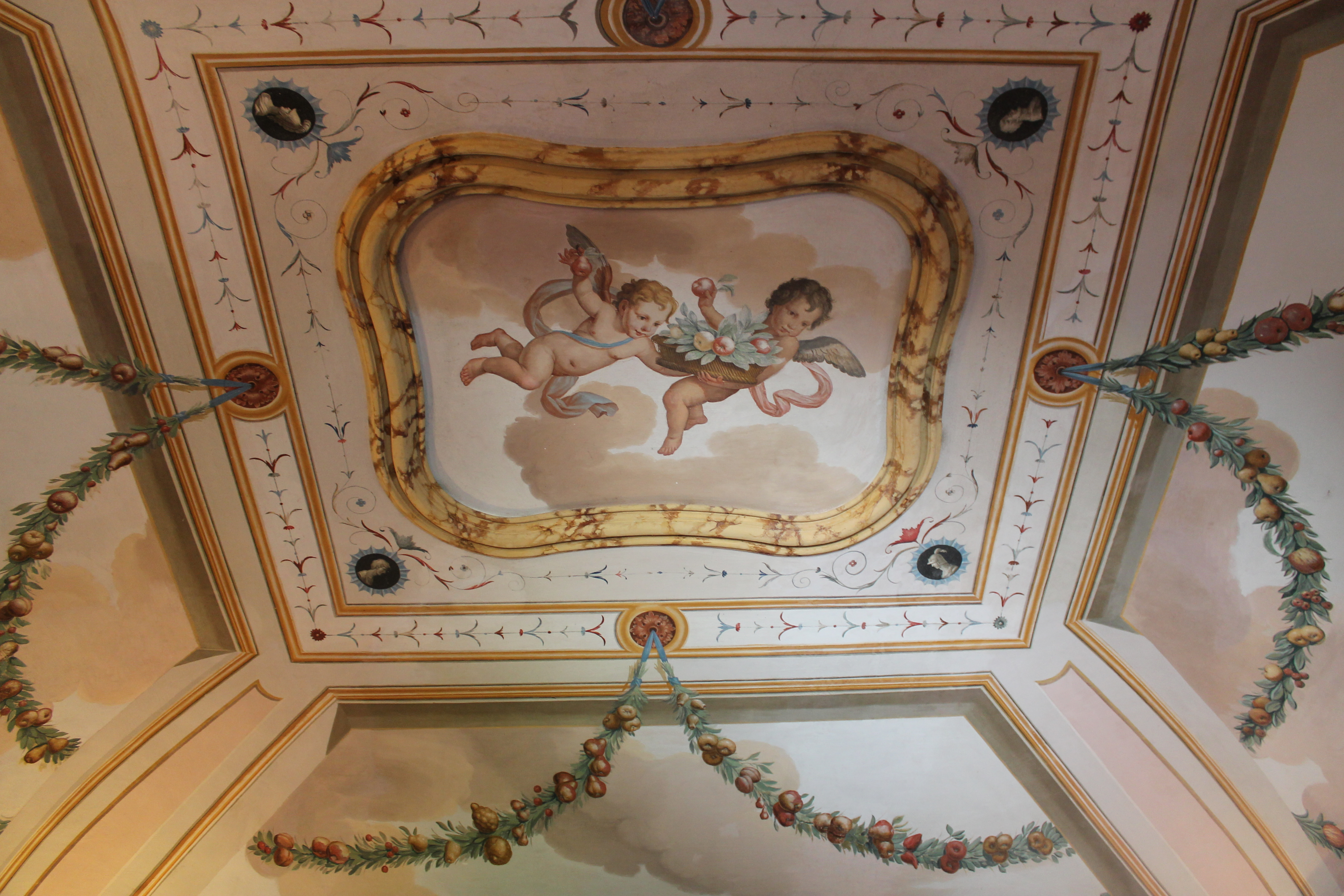

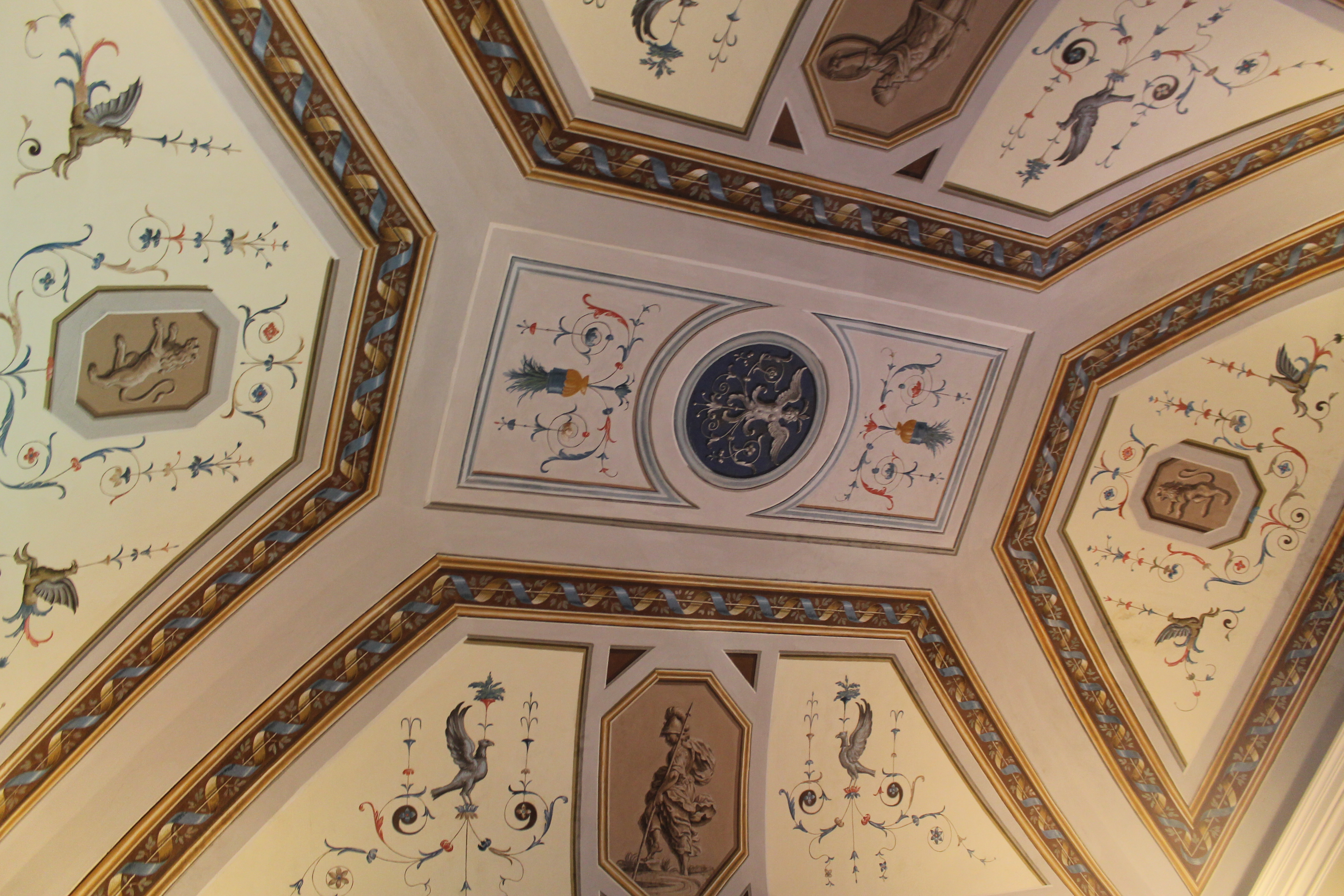

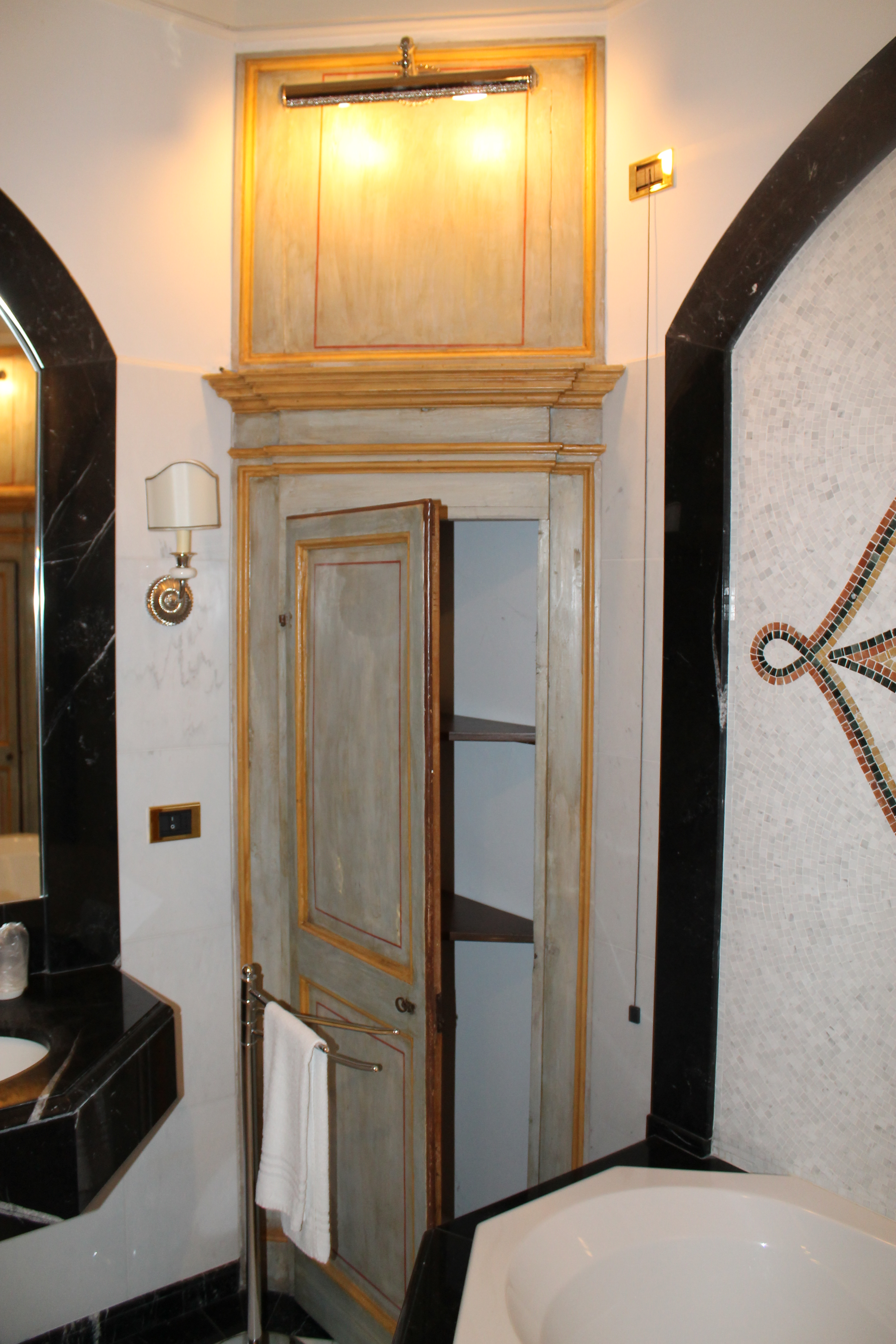

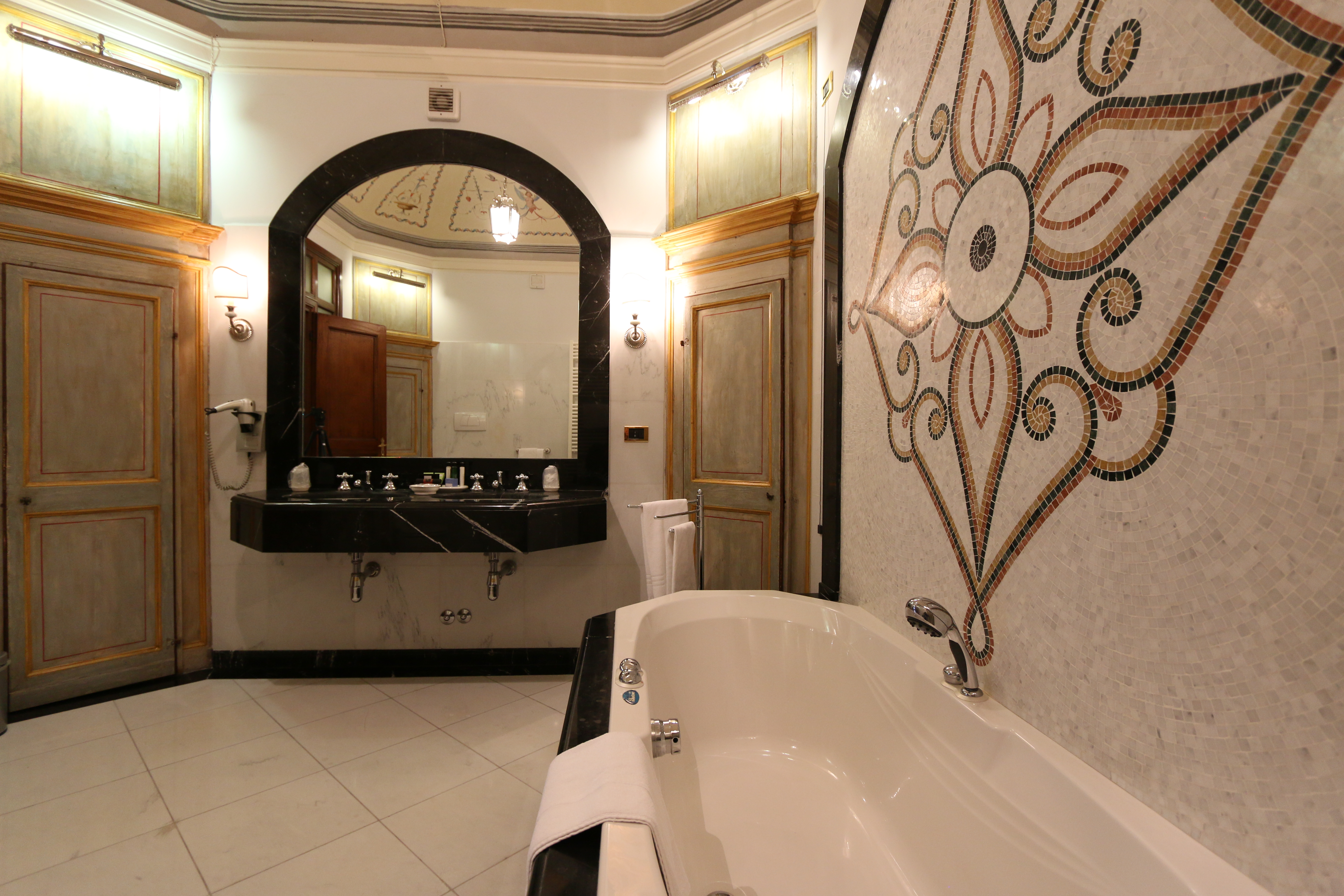

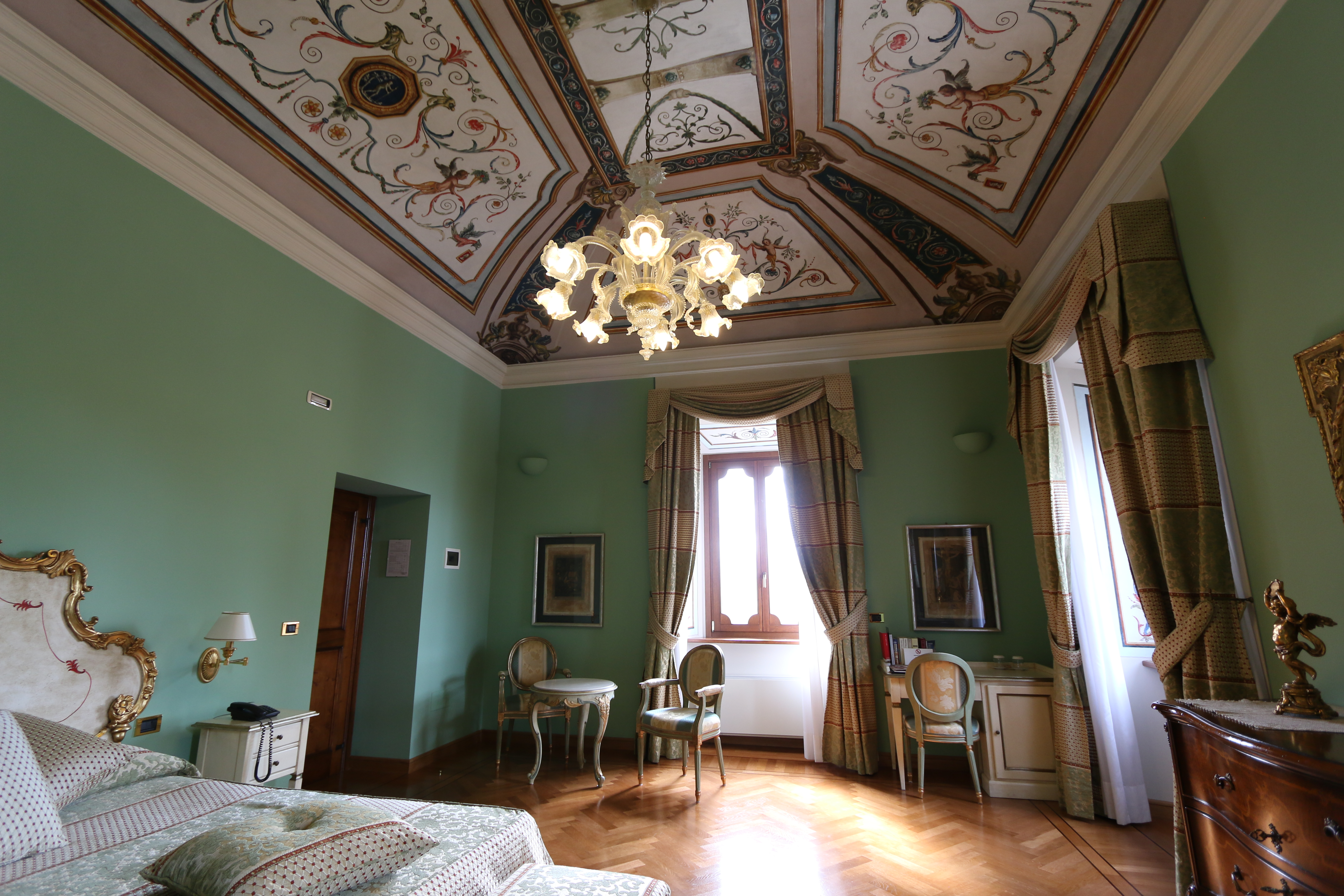

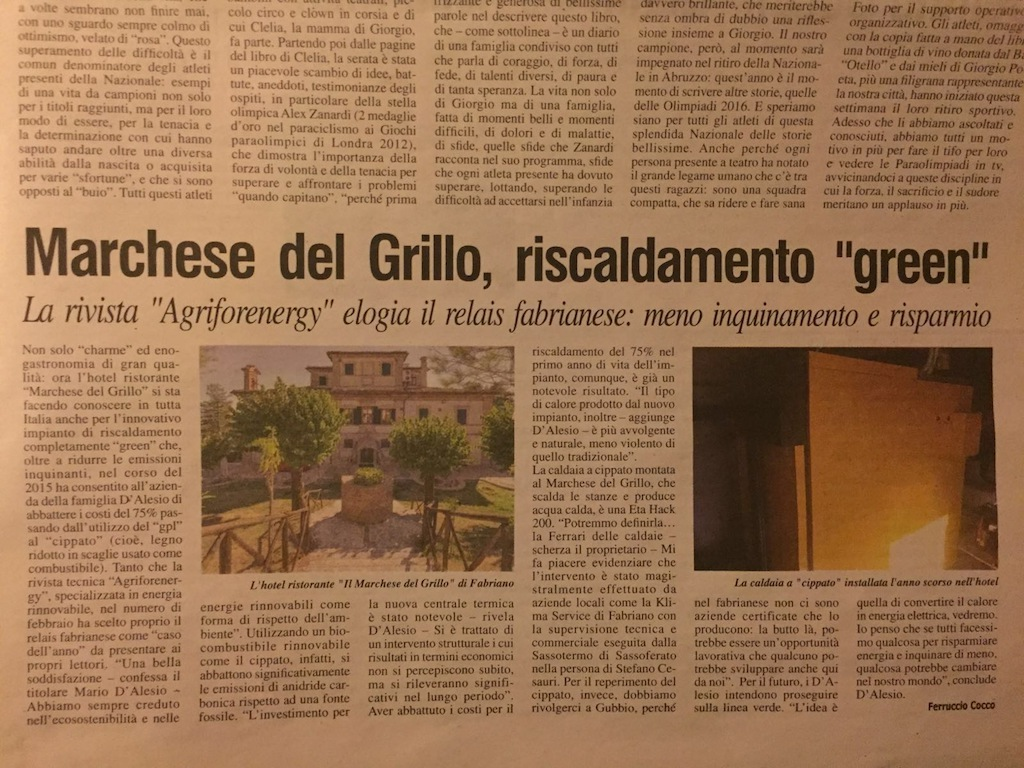
"Corriere di Ancona publication"

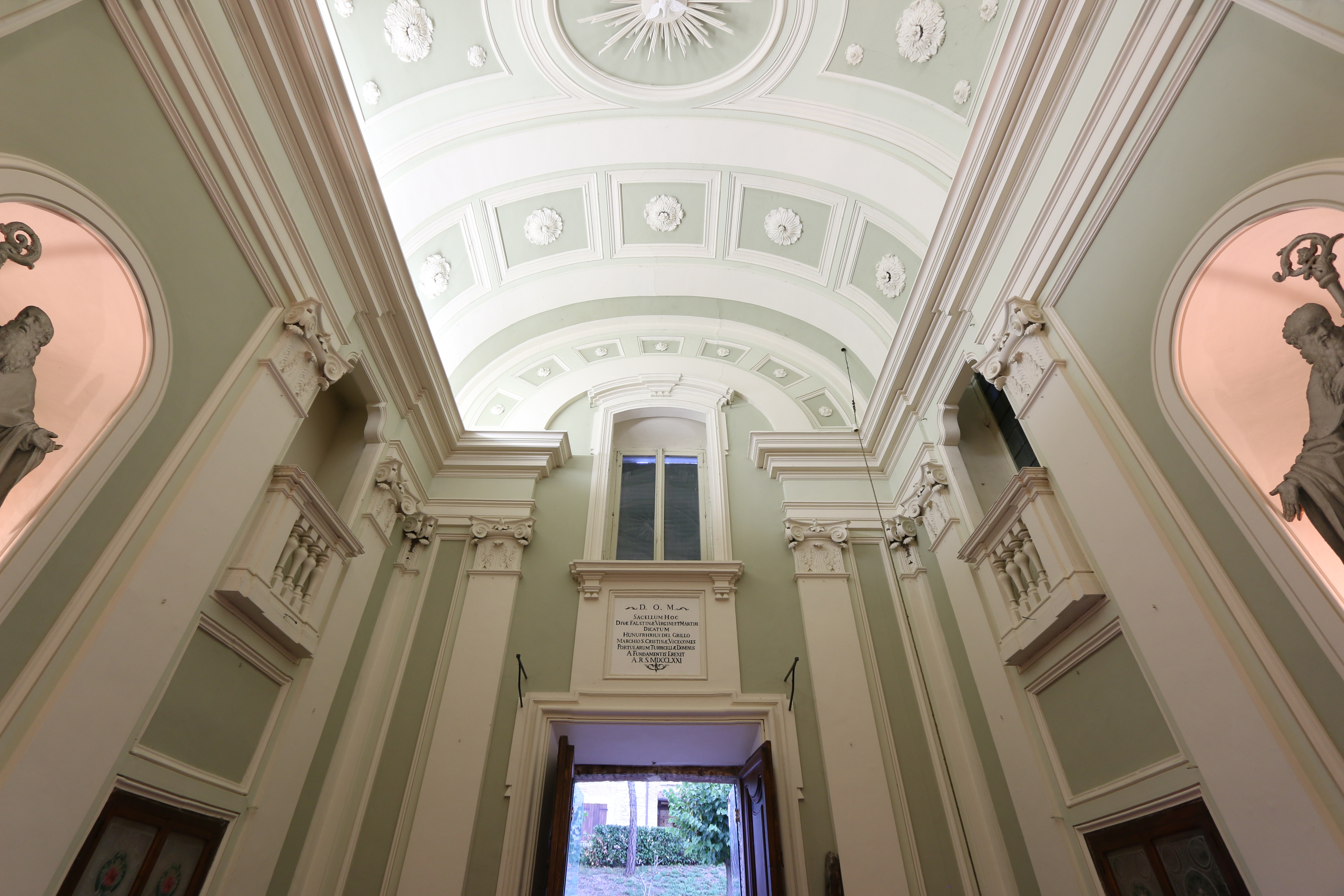

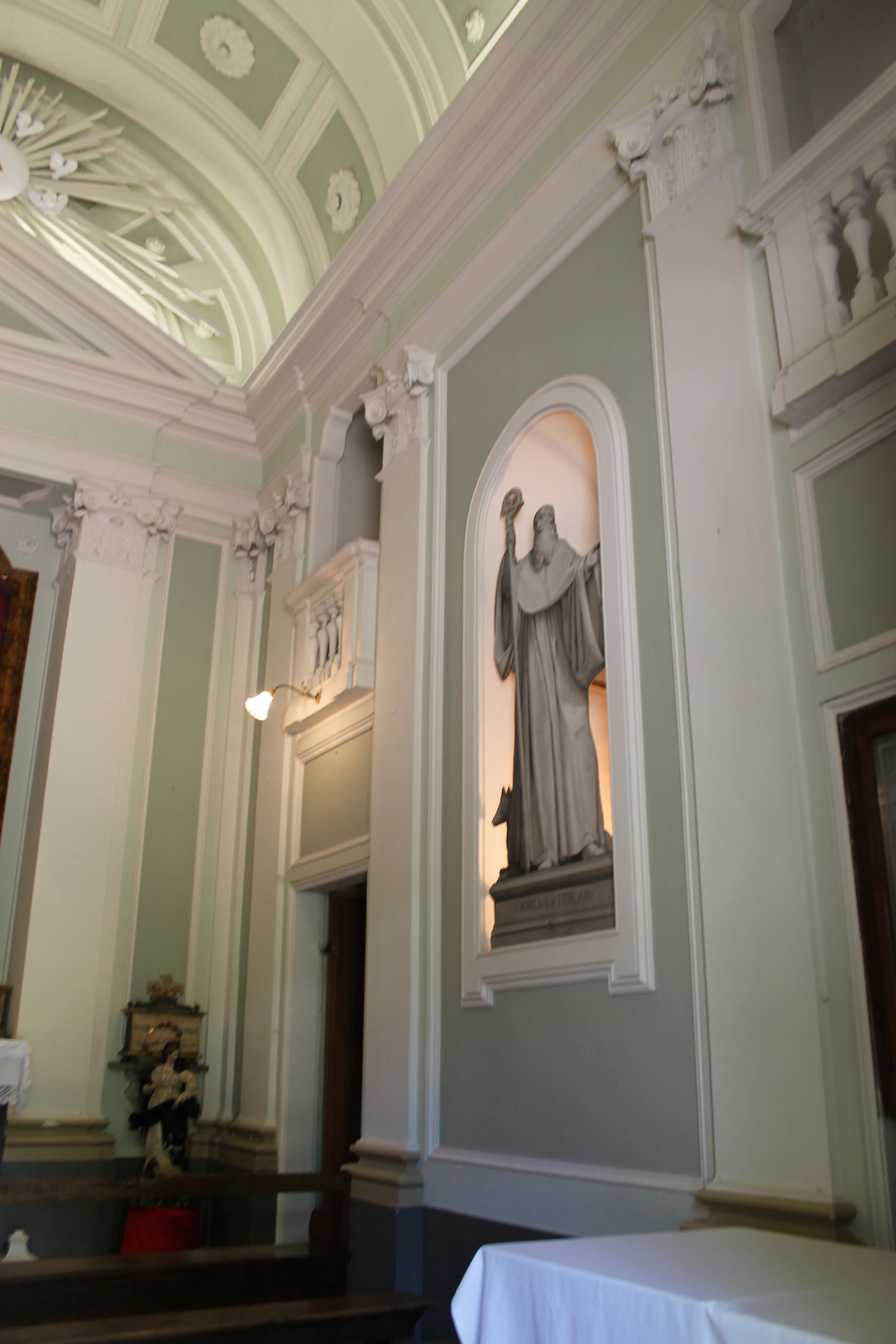

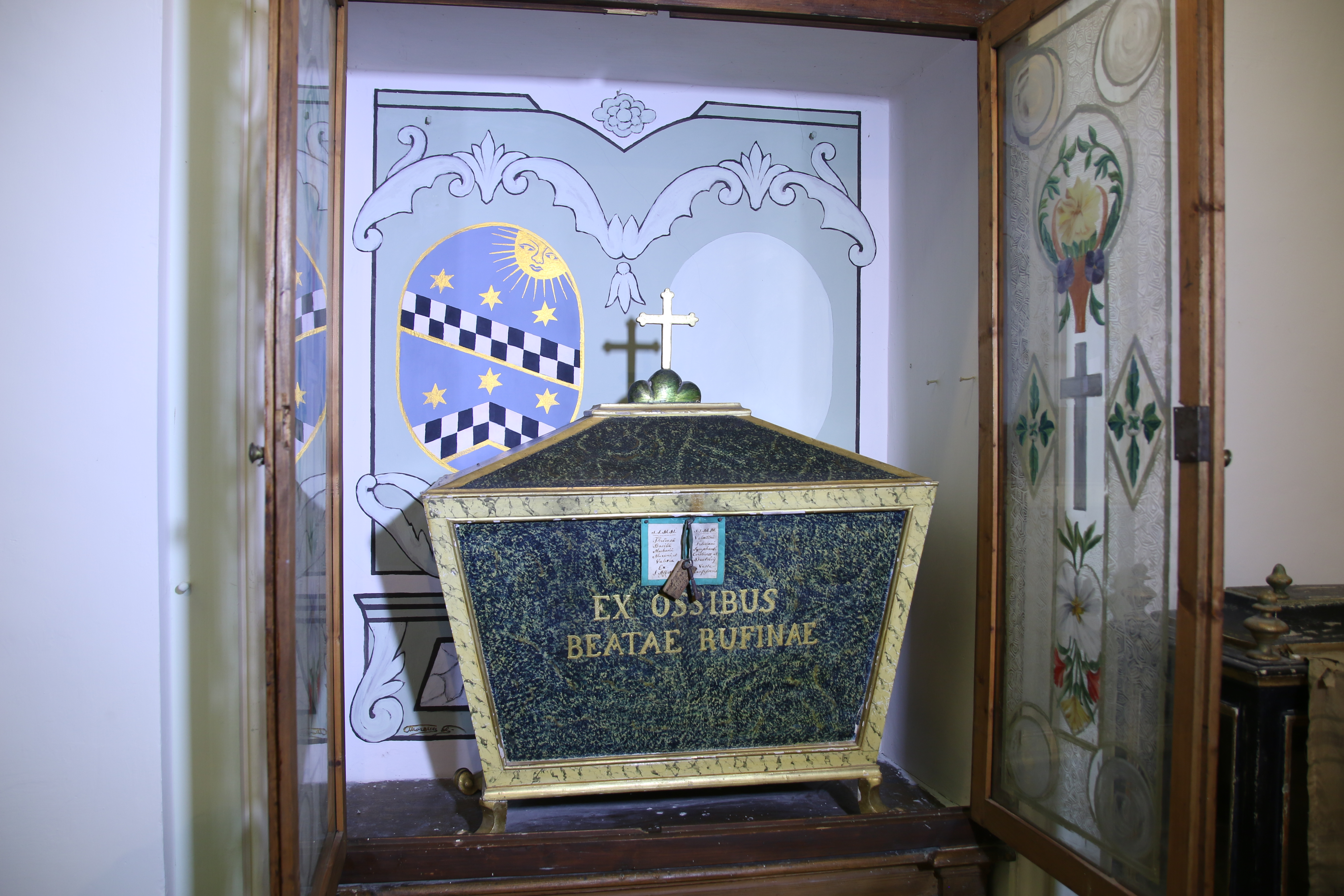

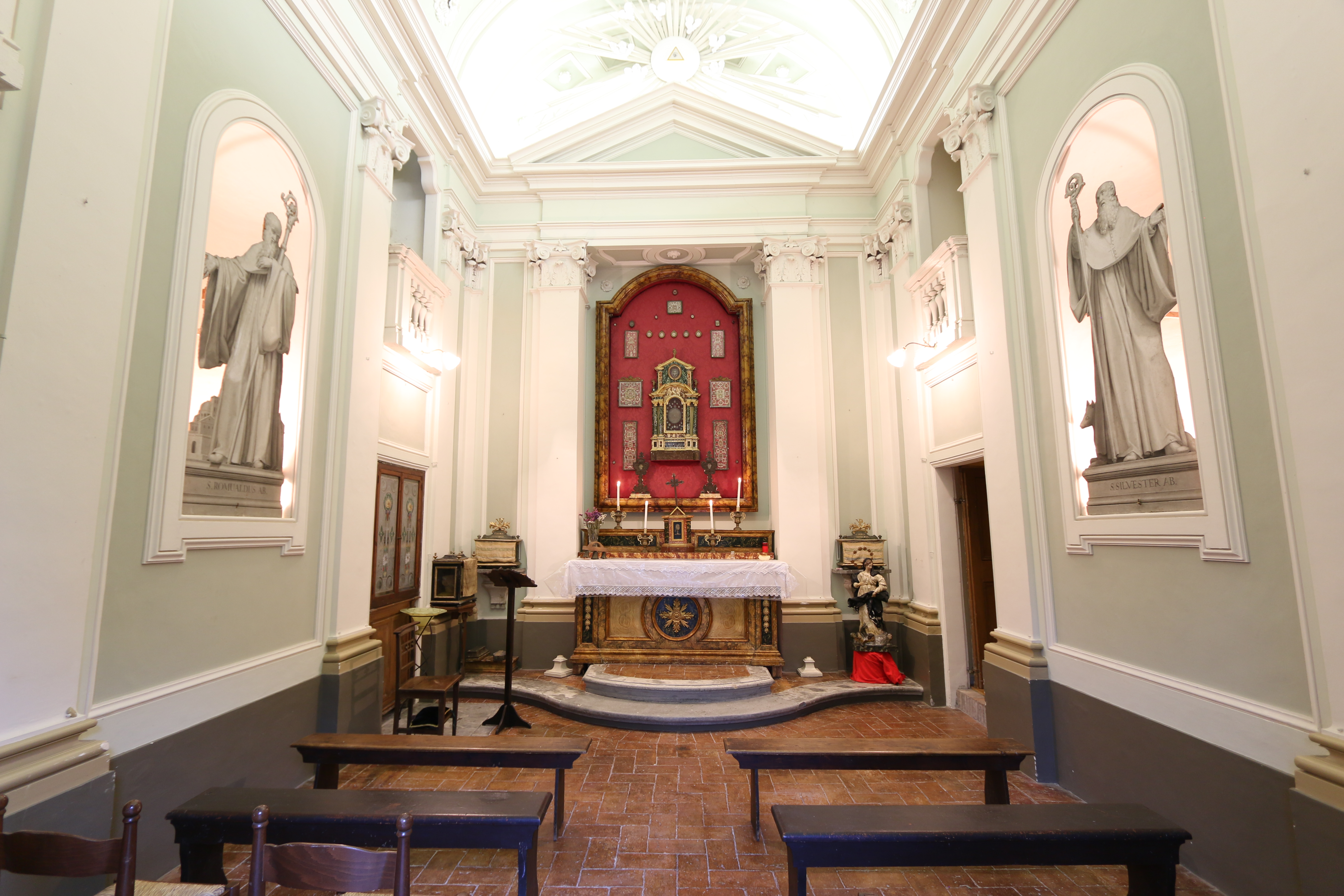
