= Antonio da Fabriano =

Italian painter

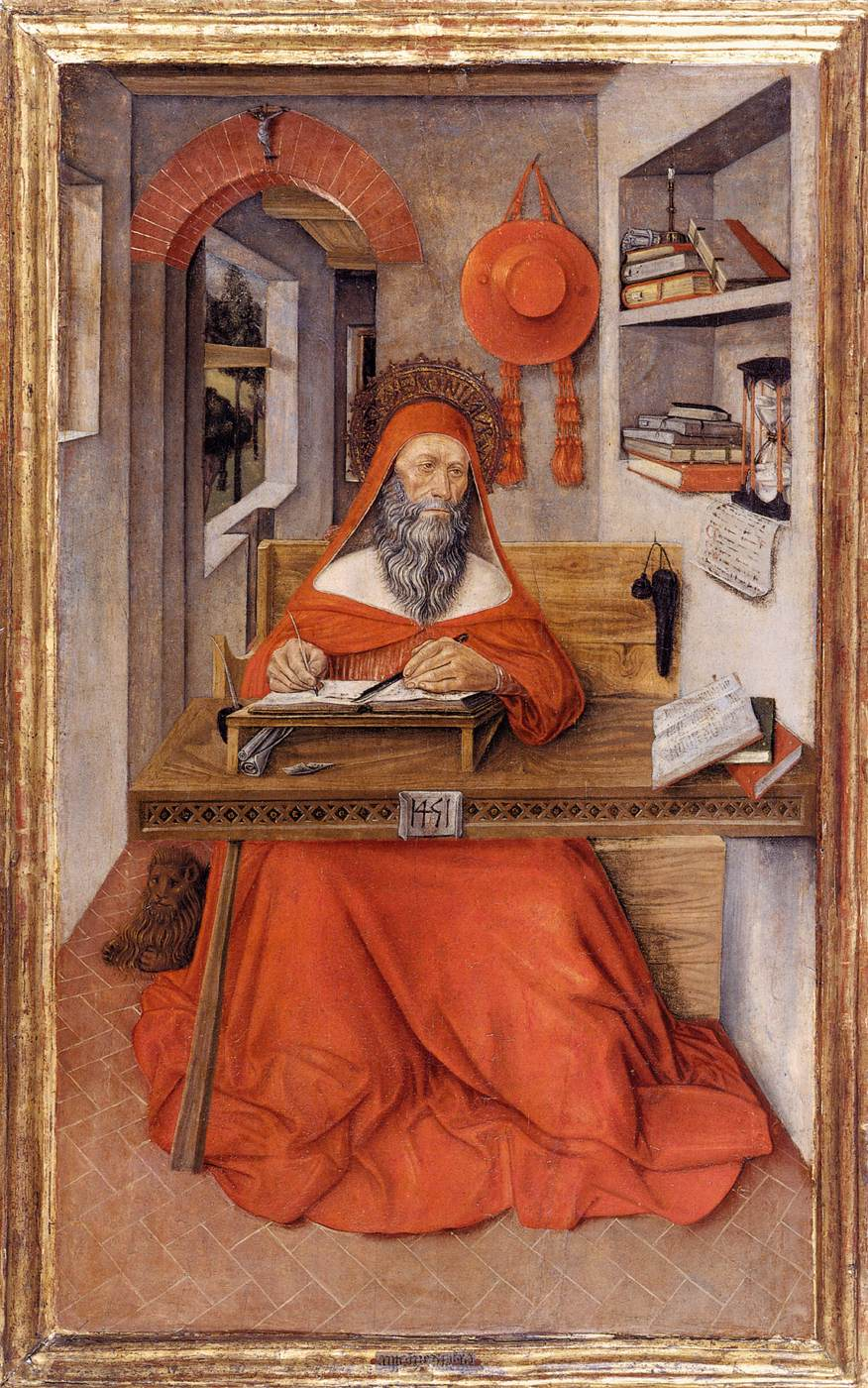
St. Jerome in his study, 1451, now in the Walters Art Museum

Antonio da Fabriano (active in mid 15th century) was an Italian painter, active in Marche.

The dates of his birth and death are uncertain. A Coronation of the Virgin in the Casa Morichi is attributed to him; and also a St Jerome, with the date 1451, in the Fornari Gallery at Fabriano, is now in the Walters Art Gallery. He was a feeble assistant of Gentile da Fabriano.

He is suspected to be the same Antonellus de Fabriano living in Genoa in 1447-1448, and married to an Albanian woman. In Genoa, he may have encountered a work of St Jerome by Jan van Eyck. A fresco of St Bernardino (1451) at the church of San Francesco at Gualdo Tadino in attributed to Antonio. Documentation notes that in 1451 Antonio was paid for gilding candlesticks for Fabriano Cathedral.
