= Domiziano Domiziani =

Italian painter

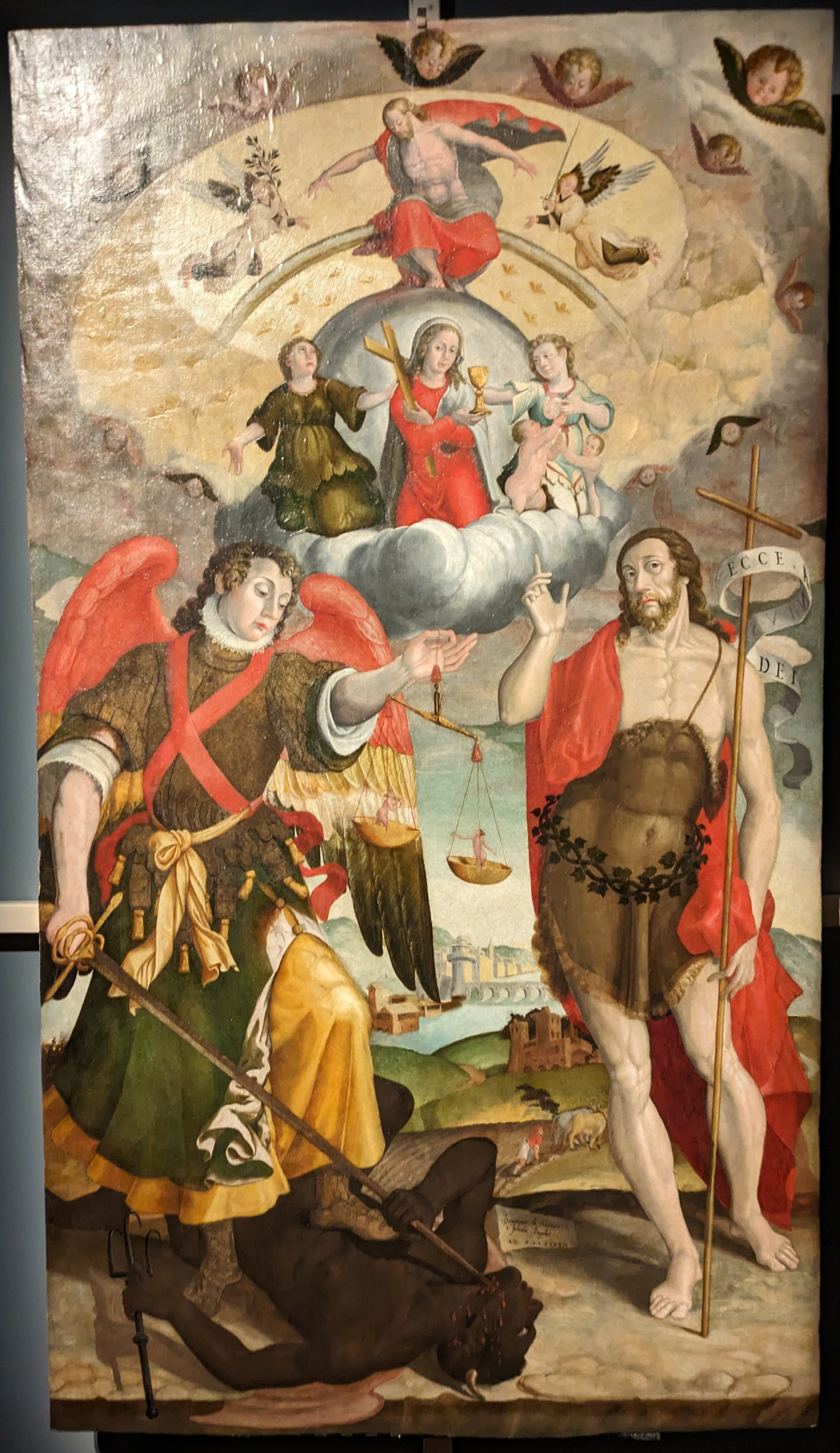
Gesù Cristo Giudice con le Virtù teologali, San Michele Arcangelo e San Giovanni Battista, 1587, olio su tavola

Domiziano Domiziani (circa 1530 – circa 1610) was an Italian painter, active in his native Fabriano in a Renaissance style.

The work of an Aerial View of Fabriano between the Blessed Dominican Nuns Bianca and Rufina was once in the church of Santa Lucia. It was painted in memory of the 1519 victory at Albacina by the local condottiere Giovanni Battista Zobicco against the soldiers of Pope Leo X.

Among his works are:

- Crucifixion with the Virgin and Saints John the Evangelist, Ugo Silvestrino, Francesco di Paolo and a Donor from the Confraternity of Santa Maria del Mercato, for the church of San Benedetto, Fabriano.
- Saints Giacinto and Francis Adoring Virgin for church of Sant Lucia.
- Frescoes for Church of Santa Maria Maddalena.
- Crucifixion and Saints for Church of Santa Caterina.
- Crucifixion with Saints Mary Magdalen and Cecilia for church of San Bartolomeo.
- Madonna del Rosario Parish church of Castelletta.
- Virgin and child with four saints Chiesetta di Santa Maria di Civita.
- Enthroned Virgin and child with Saints John the Baptist and Anthony Abbot for parish church of Rocchetta.
- Madonna and Child, Saints Paul, Nicola da Tolentino (attributed) found in Pinacoteca Civica Bruno Molajoli of Fabriano.
