= Paper and Watermark Museum =

Museum in Fabriano, Italy

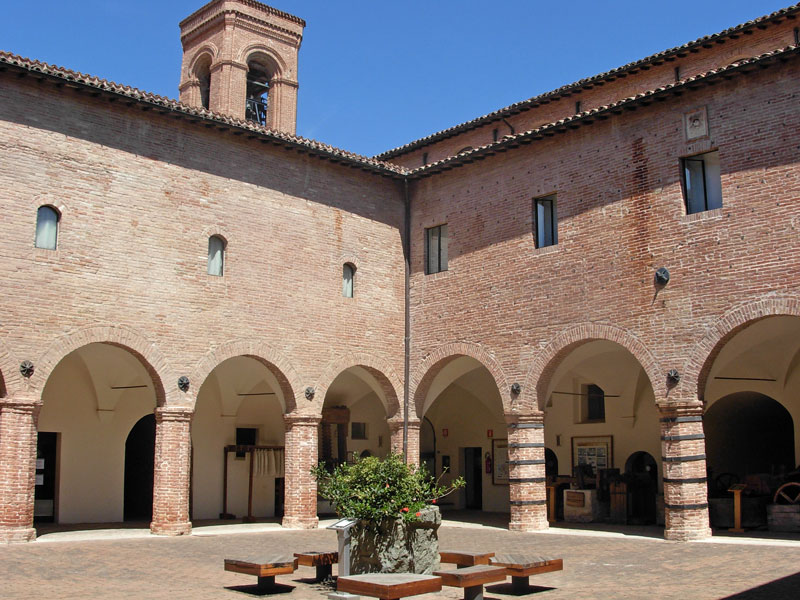
- Location: Largo Fratelli Spacca 2, 60044 Fabriano (Italy)
- Coordinates: 43.33333°N 12.90268°E
- Website: Museo della carta - Official Website

The Paper and Watermark Museum is a museum of Fabriano, Italy. Based on the paper-making tradition of Fabriano, which is documented since the 12th Century, the museum focuses on handmade paper and watermark techniques in Medieval Italy. The museum was opened in 1984. It is housed in a former Dominican convent.

== Background ==
The Fabrianese papermakers probably learned the techniques from the Arabs, and were able to sufficiently refine and perfect the process for their paper to successfully compete with parchment. The Fabrianese papermakers also developed different types of multiple hammer mills used to grind the rag cloth, and a method of sizing paper by means of animal glue.

Watermarks were a technique introduced by Fabriano in the 13th century. There are a number of methods for creating a watermark, however early watermarks involved laying wire into the paper mould. Later techniques became more sophisticated, using punches which had been carved out in wood, or cast in metal.

== Collections ==
The museum collections document the history of papermaking in Fabriano over the last 800 years. They hold examples of paper and watermarks from across this period, as well as examples of tools used in the manufacturing of paper. They give a background into the significance of paper and watermarks, especially in the Renaissance period. In addition to this, the museum runs a medieval style Fulling mill, to show how this would have been used in paper production. Further to this, the museum touches on the invention of the printing press, and the significance this had in the development of the paper industry.

In addition to the permanent collections, the museum gives practical demonstrations, as well as educational courses and workshops.

== See also ==
- Cartiere Miliani Fabriano
- Archivio storico delle Cartiere Miliani Fabriano
