= Jessica Rizzo =

Italian pornographic actress, stage actress and entrepreneur

- Born: Eugenia Valentini; 21 April 1965 (age 61); Fabriano, Ancona, Italy
- Occupations: Pornographic actress, stage actress, entrepreneur
- Years active: 1989–2003
- Notable work: Giochi bestiali in famiglia, Il nulla, Caligula
- Spouse: Marco Toto (1989–?)

Jessica Rizzo (born 21 April 1965) is an Italian former pornographic actress, stage actress, and entrepreneur.

== Life and career ==
Rizzo began her career as a singer, often performing with her husband Marco Toto on guitar.

In 1989, the couple starred in the pornographic film Giochi bestiali in famiglia. They had already starred in some amateur pornography with their faces covered by masks. The 1989 film created a stir in their hometown, drawing the attention of the Italian press and launching Rizzo's career.

Rizzo went on to appear in numerous pornographic films, including those directed by American director of adult films Gerard Damiano.

She founded the company Jessica Rizzo Communications, which produces amateur videos. She works as both a director and performer for her company. She also has her own line of lingerie and perfume.

Rizzo also works as a stage actress, having made her theatrical debut in 1995 in Dario D'Ambrosi Il nulla. In 2003, she was directed by Arnolfo Petri in Albert Camus' Caligula.

In 2011, Rizzo and Toto were involved in a case of tax evasion for allegedly evading approximately 16 million Euros.
