= Fabriano Cathedral =

Roman Catholic cathedral in Fabriano, Italy

Coordinates: 43.3354°N 12.9040°E

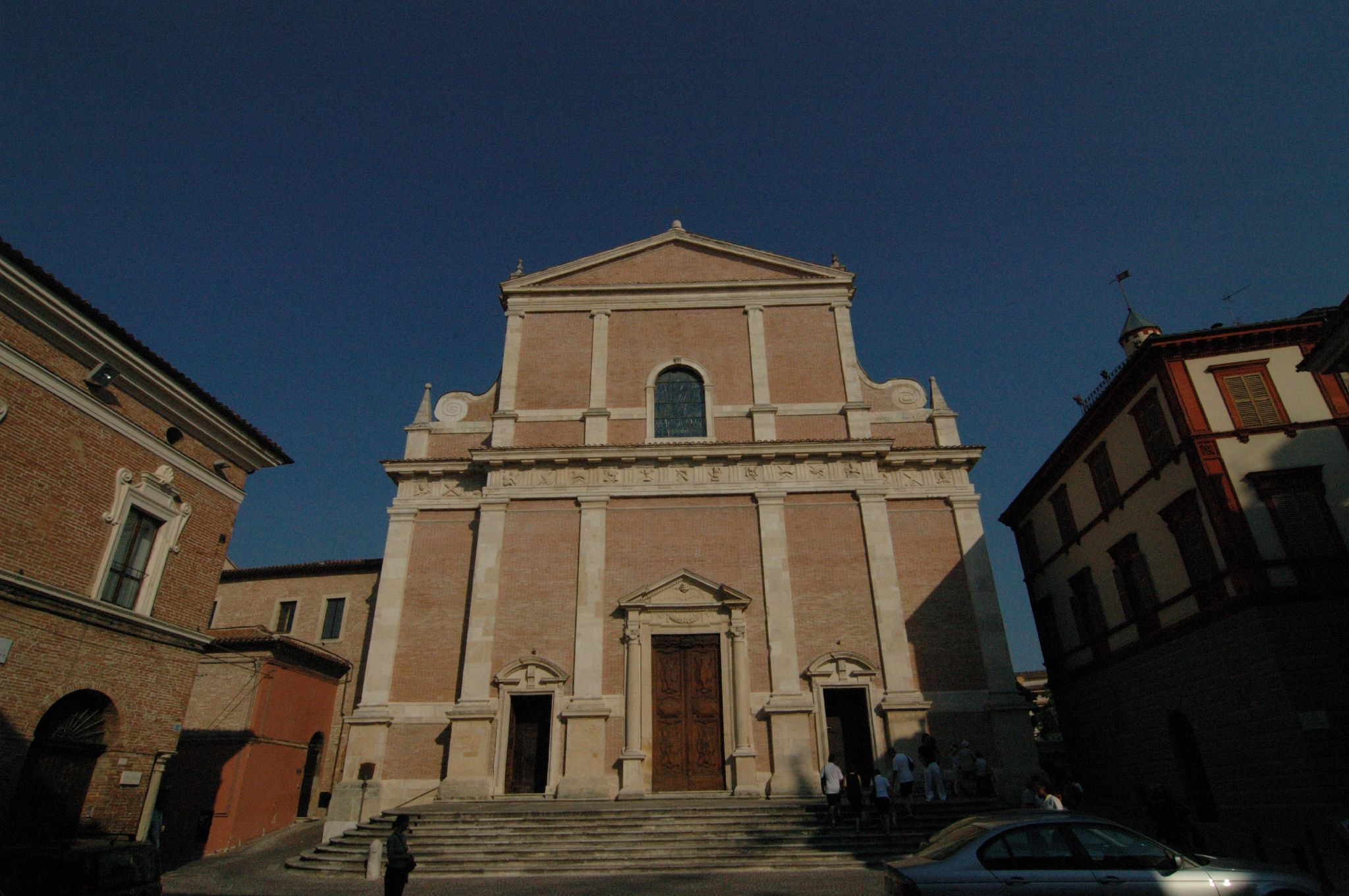
Fabriano Cathedral

Fabriano Cathedral (Italian: Duomo di Fabriano, Cattedrale di San Venanzio) is a Roman Catholic cathedral in Fabriano, Italy, dedicated to San Venanzio (Saint Venantius of Camerino). It is the seat of the Bishop of Fabriano-Matelica.

== History and description ==
The present church was built in the 14th century and rebuilt in 1607–1617 in a Baroque restoration, including stucco decoration and paintings by Gregorio Preti, Salvator Rosa, Giovanni Francesco Guerrieri, Giuseppe Puglia and Orazio Gentileschi. The apse belongs to the original 14th-century cathedral as do the cloister and the St Lawrence Chapel with frescoes (c. 1360) by Allegretto di Nuzio. The church has also frescoes depicting the Story of the True Cross (1415) by Giovanni di Corraduccio.

== Sources ==
- Website of the Diocese of Fabriano-Matelica: the parish of the cathedral (in Italian)
- Website of the Diocese of Fabriano-Matelica: history of the cathedral (in Italian)
- www.settembreorganistico.it: the organ (in Italian)
