= Apulia and Calabria =

Apulia and Calabria (Latin: Apulia et Calabria) may refer to:

- Province of Apulia and Calabria, Roman
- County of Apulia and Calabria, later Duchy, medieval
