= Apulians =

The term Apulians may refer to:

- The inhabitants of the modern region Apulia in Italy.
- The Iapygians, which lived in Apulia in classical antiquity.
