= Pulyeh =

Pulyeh پوليه
- Village
- Location within Iran
- Coordinates: 37°04′16″N 45°06′35″E
- Country: Iran
- Province: West Azerbaijan
- County: Oshnavieh
- Bakhsh: Central
- Rural District: Oshnavieh-ye Shomali

Population (2006)
  - Total: 137
- Time zone: UTC+3:30 (IRST)
  - Summer (DST): UTC+4:30 (IRDT)

Pulyeh (Persian: پوليه, also Romanized as Pūlyeh; also known as Pūleh and Pūlīā) is a village in Oshnavieh-ye Shomali Rural District, in the Central District of Oshnavieh County, West Azerbaijan Province, Iran. At the 2006 census, its population was 137, in 26 families.
