= Girolamo Nardini =

Italian painter

Girolamo Nardini (c. 1460 – 1538) was an Italian painter of a late-Gothic and early Renaissance styles.

He was born in Sant'Angelo in Vado. He painted the Polyptych of St James with St Augustine Bishop (circa 1500) for the church of San Giacomo in Pergola. He also painted in Gubbio in 1510. He painted a Virgin and Child with Saints Emil and Roch for the parish church of Melano. He painted independently or with his brothers, Dionisio and Giacomo Nardini.
