= Giovanni di Corraduccio =

Italian painter

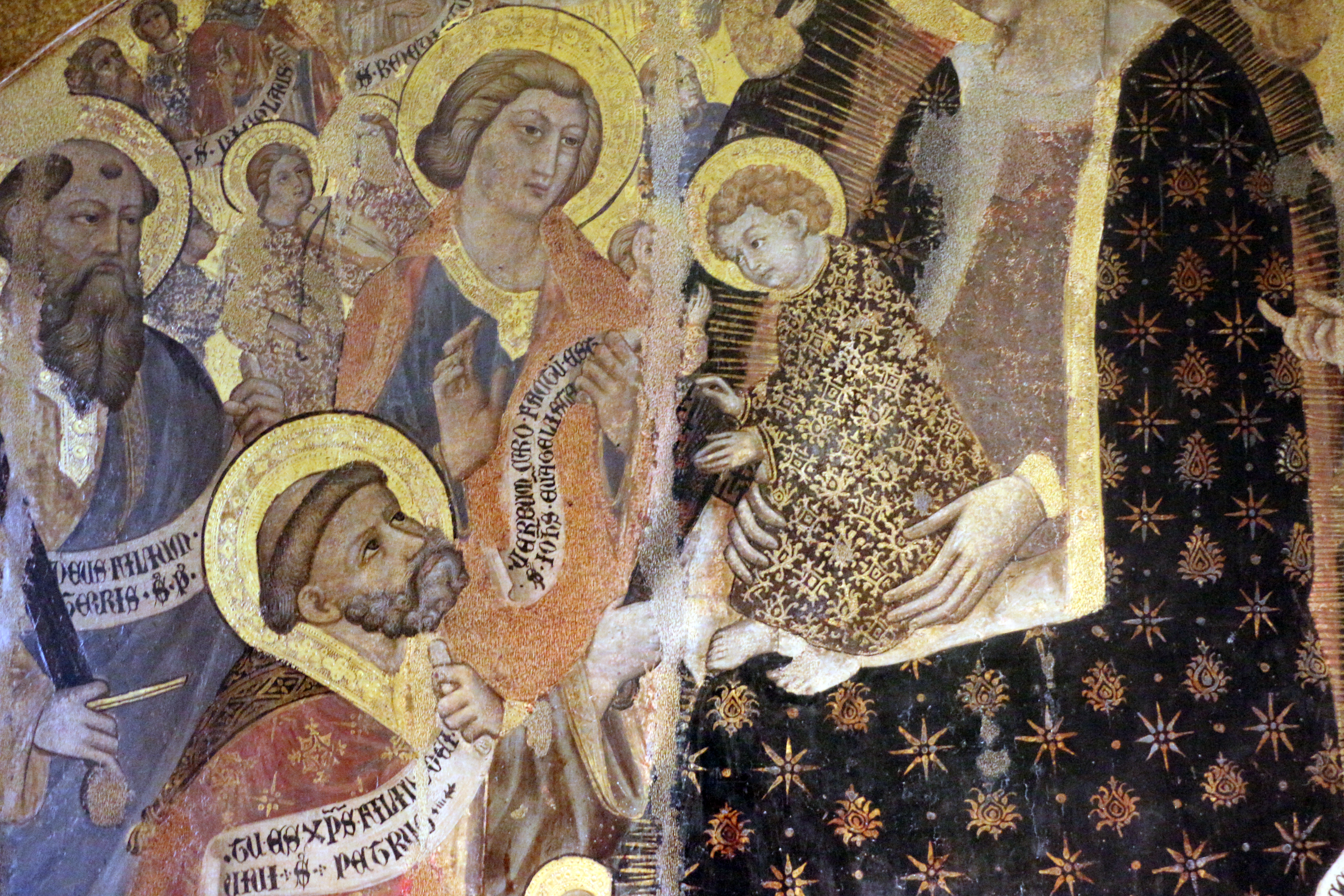
Madonna and saints, Macerata museum

Giovanni di Corraduccio, also called Giovanni Mazaforte, (active circa 1404–1437) was an Italian painter of the Gothic style, active mainly in Umbria and Marche.

He was born in Foligno. Based on documents, he is thought to have worked in Assisi and Spoleto, but only a few deteriorated frescoes (1415–16) in the Chapel of Santa Croce in San Venanzio, the Duomo of Fabriano remain as his documented work. Among the works attributed to him are frescoes in the Palazzo Trinci of Foligno depicting secular subjects are also attributed to Corraduccio. Also frescoes in Santa Maria di Pietrarossa of Trevi have been attributed to him. He is said to have been influenced by Ottaviano Nelli and Lorenzo Salimbeni, who were also active in Palazzo Trinci.

Pietro di Giovanni Mazzaforte, his son, was also a painter. Andrea di Cagno is said to have trained with Corraduccio in Foligno.
