= Gregorio Preti =

Italian painter

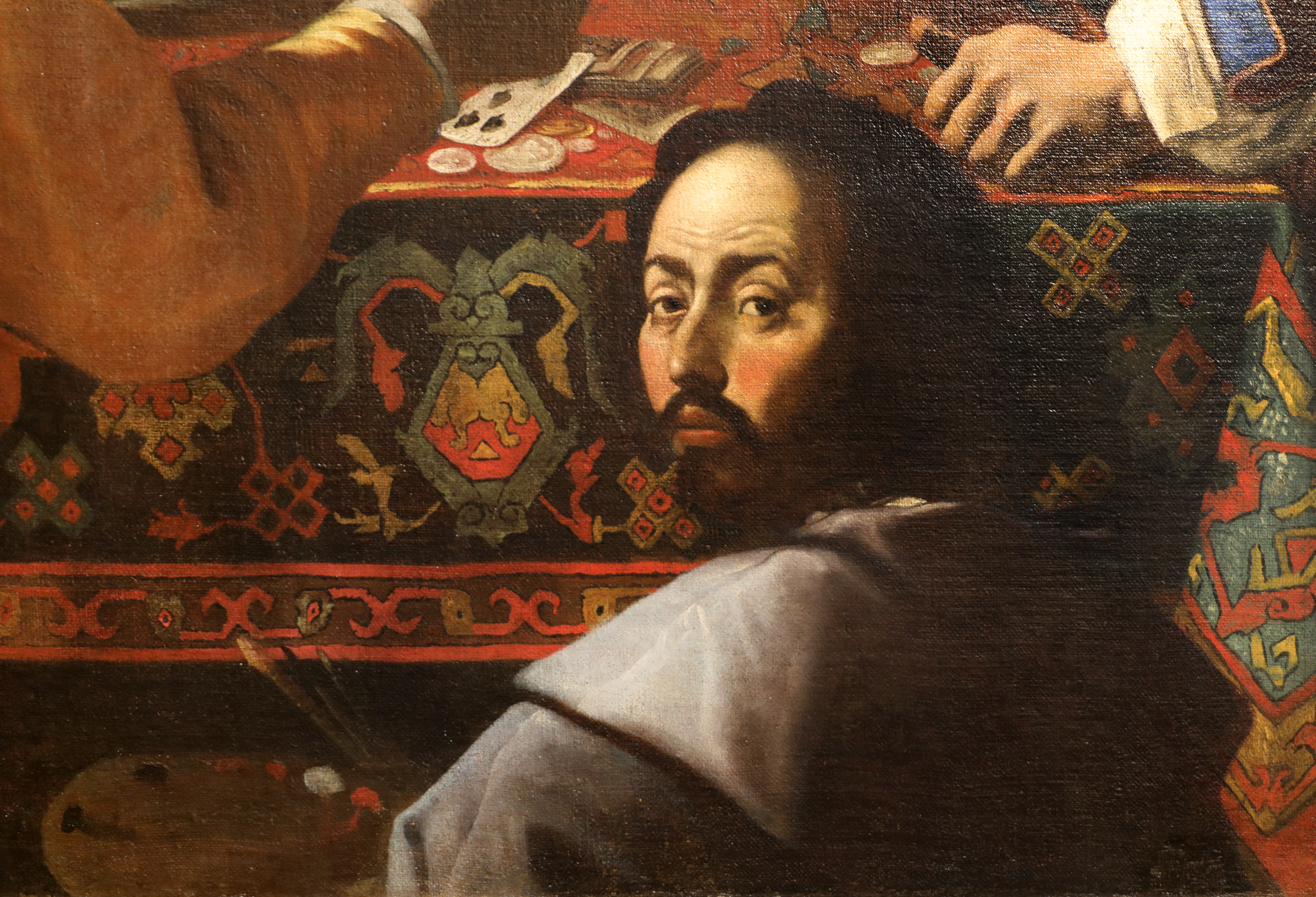
Selfportrait

Gregorio Preti (Taverna 1603 - Rome 1672) was a Baroque painter. He was the brother of famous Calabrian painter Mattia Preti. There is a fresco by him in the church of San Carlo ai Catinari at Rome.
