= Giuseppe Puglia =

Italian painter

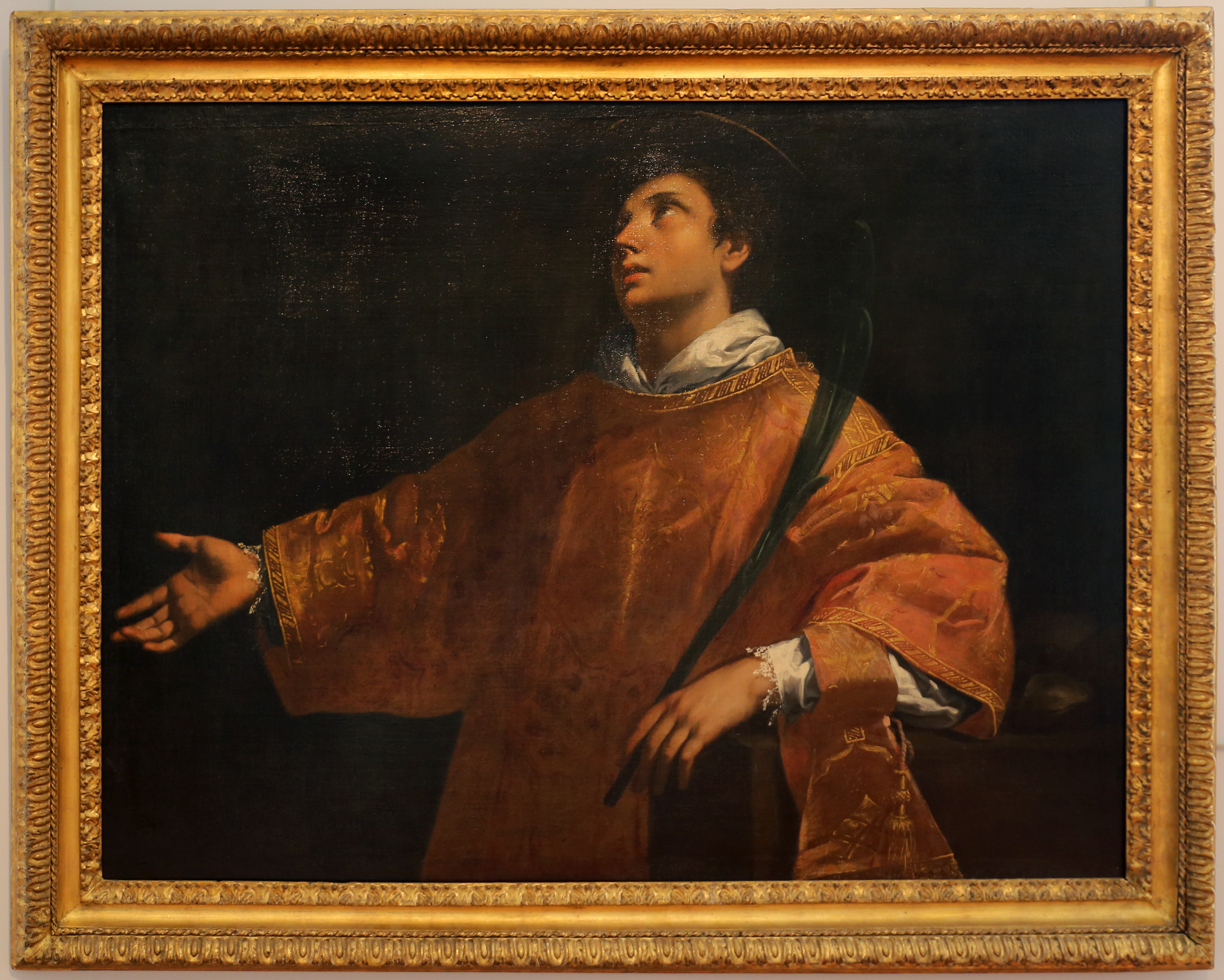
Saint Stephen, Musée Fesch, Ajaccio

Giuseppe Puglia (1600–1636) was an Italian painter, born in Rome. He was also known as 'Giuseppe del Bastaro' or 'Il Bastardo'. According to Giovanni Baglione, a contemporary biographer of Italian artists, Puglia artistically flourished chiefly during the pontificate of Urban VIII. There are several of his works in churches in Rome, including a Presentation in the Temple, in the cloister of the Padri della Minerva, and an altarpiece in the church of Santa Maria Maggiore, The Virgin Appears to Giovanni Patrizi. The church of San Girolamo houses his works Descent from the Cross and St. Jerome. He died in Rome at the age of 35-36. Puglia's work has undergone a rediscovery since the 1970s.

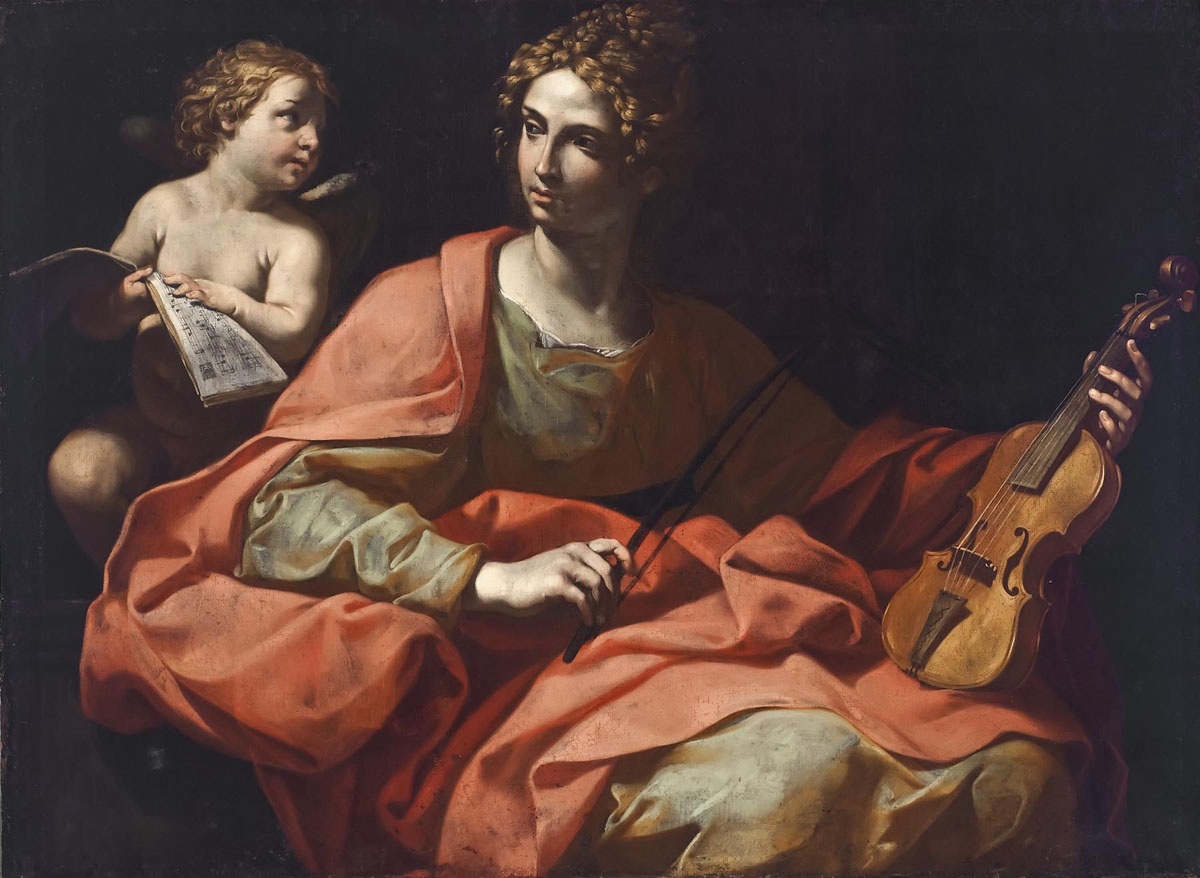
St. Cecilia, attributed to Giuseppe Puglia, Winnipeg Art Gallery
