= Allegretto Nuzi =

Italian painter

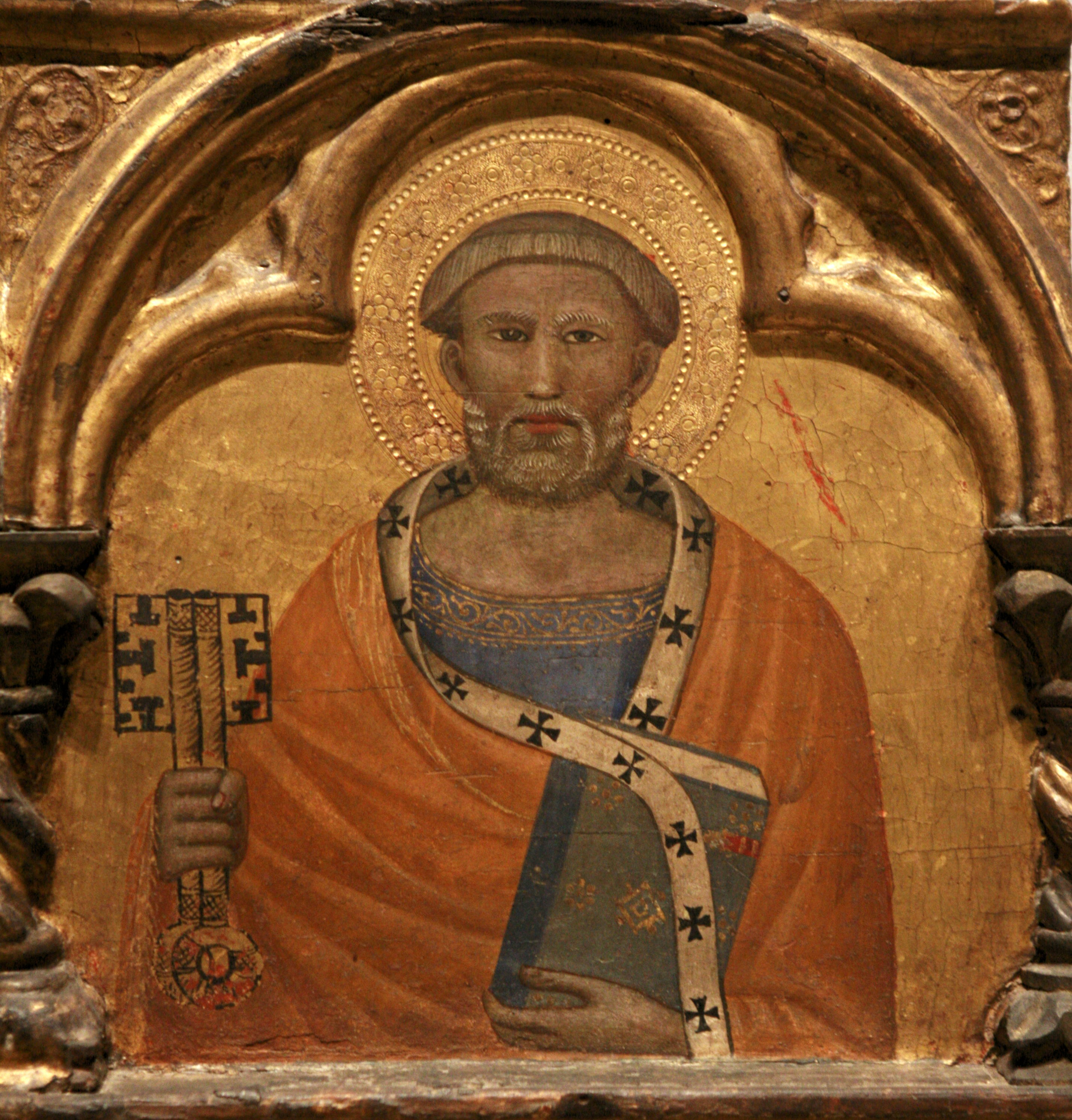
close-up of Busts of Five Apostles by Allegretto Nuzi, Musée des Beaux-Arts de Strasbourg, 1360

Allegretto Nuzi or Allegretto di Nuzio (1315–1373) was an Italian painter, active in a Gothic style mainly around Fabriano, in the Province of Ancona.

== Biography ==
Nuzi was probably trained in Fabriano by local masters, including the so-called Master of Campodonico. Documents verify his presence in Florence in 1346, where he would have encountered works by Giotto and his followers. His style has been characterized as Giottesque and Sienese. Nuzi primarily worked under commissions for churches, producing religious-themed works.

In Fabriano, his masterwork are the frescoes in the Chapel of Sant’Orsola in the church of Santa Lucia. He also painted some wooden statues now in the Pinacoteca Civica di Bruno Molajoli in Fabriano.
