= Adoration of the Shepherds (Crivelli) =

Painting by Carlo Crivelli

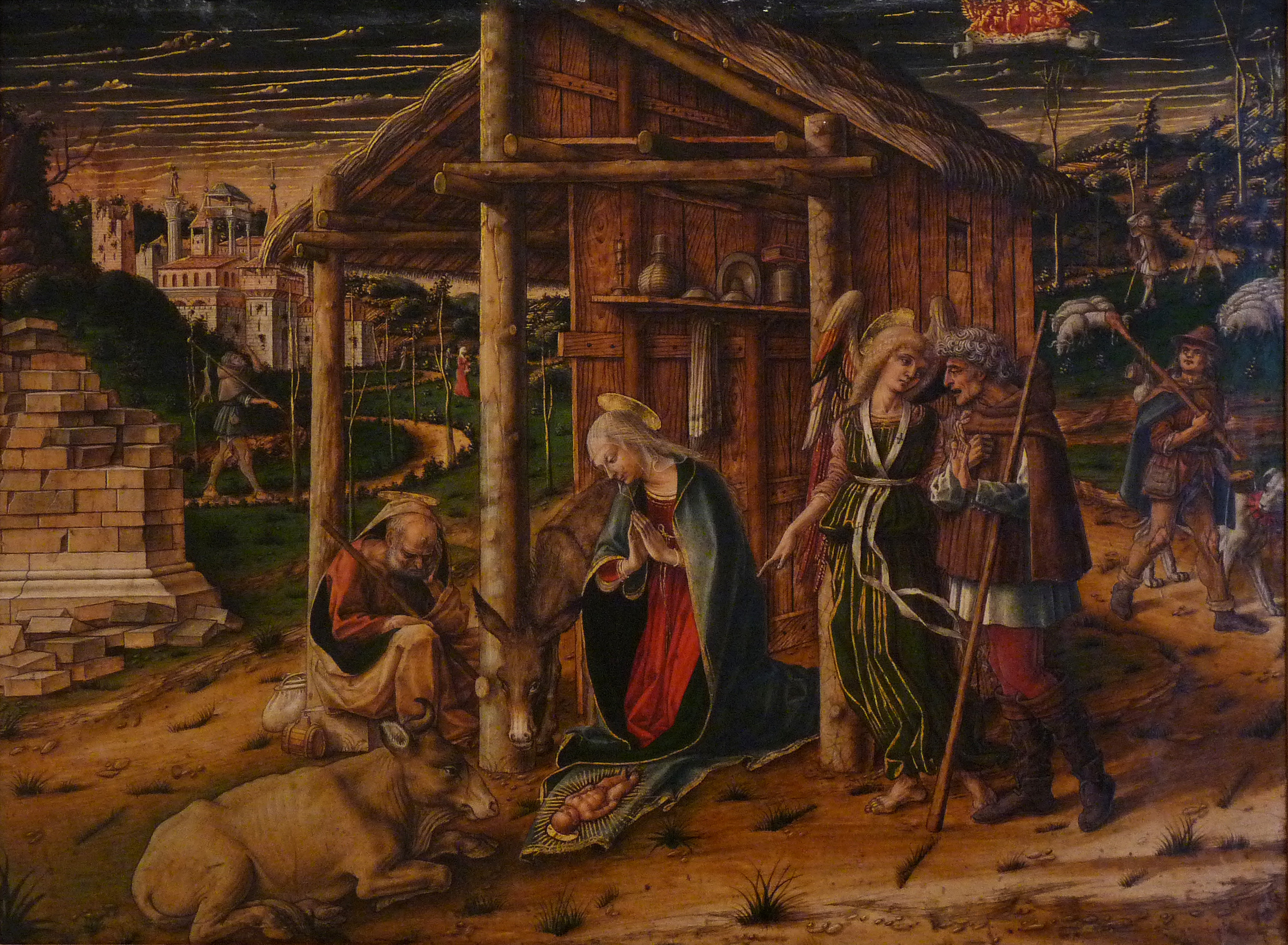
- Artist: Carlo Crivelli
- Year: c. 1480
- Medium: tempera on panel
- Movement: Quattrocento
- Subject: Adoration of the Shepherds
- Dimensions: 37.8 cm × 51.3 cm (14.9 in × 20.2 in)
- Location: Musée des Beaux-Arts, Strasbourg
- Accession: 1890

Adoration of the Shepherds is a c. 1480 tempera and gold on panel painting by the Italian painter Carlo Crivelli. It is now in the Museum of Fine Arts in Strasbourg, for which it was acquired in Florence by Wilhelm von Bode. Its inventory number is 171. Art historians are uncertain about the dating of the painting, and propositions have ranged from 1470 to 1491.

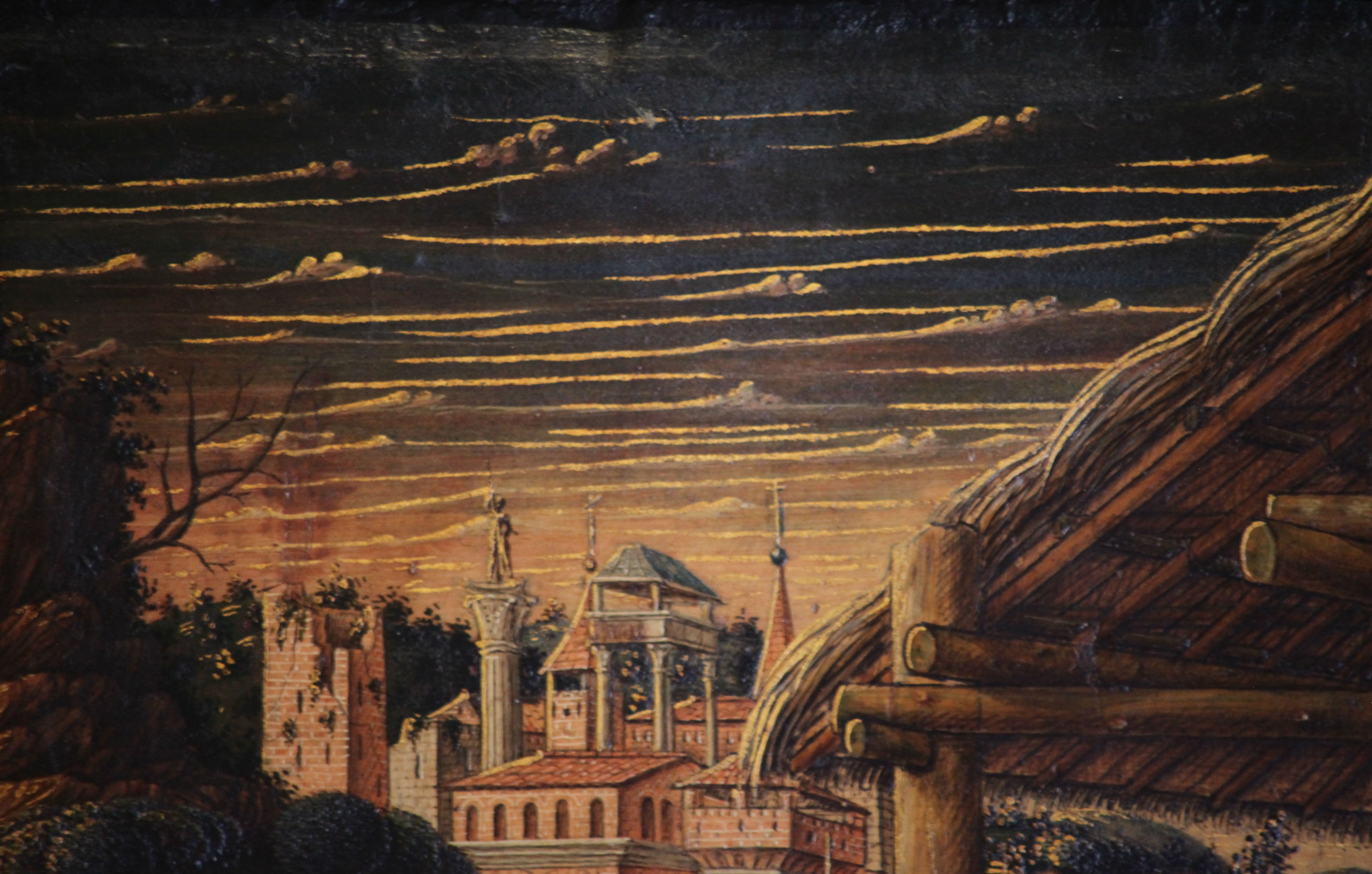
Detail of clouds

Its commissioner is unknown but the work relates to the Nativity panel in the predella of the Ottoni Altarpiece in Matelica. Its attribution has varied - in 1896 Charles Loeser argued it was a fake and Drey wrote of its artist as an elusive "Master of the Adoration of Strasbourg", but it is now held to be a late completely autograph work by Crivelli. Zampetti refers to it as "a small masterpiece".

Bethlehem is shown in the work's background, possibly modelled on Ascoli Piceno, with the addition of a column with a gilded statue, one of the most noted ancient monuments of Constantinople. The perspectivally foreshortened Christ Child leans on a corner of the Madonna's mantle in a manner reminiscent of Mantegna's Ovetari Chapel frescoes.
