= Roman Catholic Diocese of Matelica =

The Diocese of Matelica (Latin: Dioecesis Mathelicensis) was a Roman Catholic diocese located in the town of Matelica in the Province of Macerata in the Italian region of Marche.

== History ==
Camillo Acquacotta conjectures that it was around 578 that the first epoch of the diocese of Matelica came to an end, as a result of the massive destruction of the Lombard invasions.

On 8 July 1785, the diocese of Matelica was revived by Pope Pius VI, its territory was separated from that of the diocese of Fabriano, and it was united aeque principaliter with the Diocese of Fabriano to form the Diocese of Fabriano e Matelica, two dioceses joined by the fact of having one bishop. The Collegiate Church of S. Maria e S. Bartolomeo was erected into a cathedral church, and made immediately subject to the Holy See (Papacy). Its Chapter was appointed to be the cathedral Chapter, consisting of an Archpriest and thirteen Canons, two of whom would fill the offices of Theologus and Penitentiary. The rights of the bishop and diocese of Camerino over the city and territory of Matelica were extinguished. The bishop of Fabriano e Matelica would be expected to live part of the year in Fabriano and part in Matelica.

In a decree of the Second Vatican Council, it was recommended that dioceses be reorganized to take into account modern developments. The diocese of Matelica was united with the diocese of Fabriano as part of a project initiated by Pope John XXIII and continued by his successors. This project aimed to reduce the number of dioceses in Italy and rationalize their borders in response to modern population changes and shortages of clergy. The change was approved by Pope John Paul II during an audience on September 27, 1986, and formally decreed by the Sacred Congregation of Bishops of the Papal Curia on September 30, 1986. The unified diocese was named Dioecesis Fabrianensis-Mathelicensis, with its seat established in Fabriano. Matelica's former cathedral received the honorary title of co-cathedral, and its chapter became the Capitulum Concathedralis. This union additionally resulted in a single episcopal curia, one seminary, and one ecclesiastical tribunal, with all of the clergy to be incardinated in the new Diocese of Fabriano-Matelica.

== Bishops of Matelica ==
- Equitius (attested 487)
- Basilius (attested 499)
- Florentius (attested 551)

Bishops of Matelica e Fabriano

- Nicola Pietro Andrea Zoppetti, O.E.S.A. (1785–1796)
- Giovanni Francesco Capelletti (1800–1806)
- Domenico Buttaoni (1806–1822)
- Pietro Balducci, C.M. (1822–1837)
- Francesco Faldi (1837–1858)
- Antonio Maria Valenziani (1858–1876)
- Leopoldo Angelo Santanchè, O.F.M. Ref. (1876-1883)
- Macario Sorini (1883-1893)
- Aristide Golfieri (1895-1895)
- Luciano Gentilucci (1895-1909)
- Pietro Zanolini (1910-1913)
- Andrea Cassulo (1914–1921)
- Luigi Ermini (1921–1945)
- Lucio Crescenzi (1945–1960)
- Macario Tinti (1960-1978 Retired)
- Luigi Scuppa (1978-1986)

The diocese of Matelica was suppressed on 30 September 1986.

== See also ==
- Roman Catholic Diocese of Fabriano-Matelica
- Catholic Church in Italy

== Bibliography ==
=== Reference works for bishops ===
- Gams, Pius Bonifatius (1873). Series episcoporum Ecclesiae catholicae: quotquot innotuerunt a beato Petro apostolo (in Latin). Ratisbon: Typis et Sumptibus Georgii Josephi Manz. p. 704.
- Ritzler, Remigius; Sefrin, Pirminus (1952). Hierarchia catholica medii et recentis aevi. Vol. Tomus V (1667-1730). Patavii: Messagero di S. Antonio.
- Ritzler, Remigius; Sefrin, Pirminus (1958). Hierarchia catholica medii et recentis aevi. Vol. Tomus VI (1730-1799). Patavii: Messagero di S. Antonio.
- Ritzler, Remigius; Sefrin, Pirminus (1968). Hierarchia Catholica medii et recentioris aevi (in Latin). Vol. VII (1800–1846). Monasterii: Libreria Regensburgiana.
- Remigius Ritzler; Pirminus Sefrin (1978). Hierarchia catholica Medii et recentioris aevi (in Latin). Vol. VIII (1846–1903). Il Messaggero di S. Antonio.
- Pięta, Zenon (2002). Hierarchia catholica medii et recentioris aevi (in Latin). Vol. IX (1903–1922). Padua: Messagero di San Antonio. ISBN 978-88-250-1000-8.

=== Studies ===
- Acquacotta, Camillo (1838). Memorie di Matelica (in Italian). Ancona: Tipografia Baluffi. pp. 31–38.
- Cappelletti, Giuseppe (1848). Le chiese d'Italia: dalla loro origine sino ai nostri giorni (in Italian). Vol. Tomo settimo. Venezia: G. Antonelli. pp. 609–658.
- Lanzoni, Francesco (1927). Le diocesi d'Italia dalle origini al principio del secolo VII (an. 604). Faenza: F. Lega, p. 489. (in German)
