= Mattia de Nazarei =

Beatified Italian nun

Blessed Mattia de Nazarei
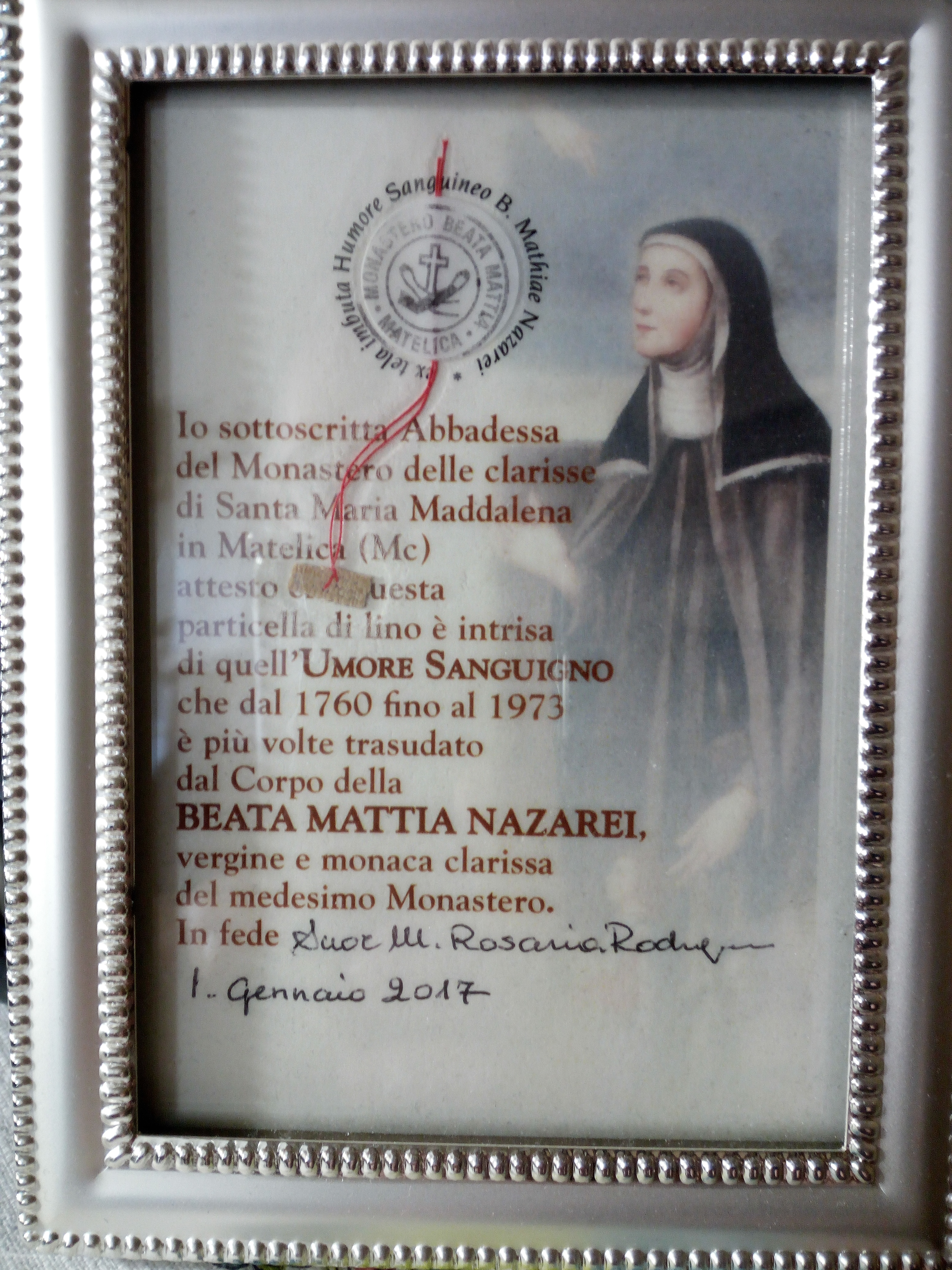

Religious
- Born: 1 March 1253; Matelica, Macerata, Papal States
- Died: 28 December 1319 (aged 66); Matelica, Macerata, Papal States
- Venerated in: Roman Catholic Church
- Beatified: 27 July 1765, Saint Peter's Basilica, Papal States by Pope Clement XIII
- Feast: 28 December
- Attributes: Religious habit; Book
- Patronage: Matelica

Blessed Mattia de Nazarei (1 March 1253 – 28 December 1319) was an Italian Roman Catholic nun of the Poor Clares.

Pope Clement XIII confirmed her cult in 1765 and this acted as her formal beatification. A miracle attributed to her is under investigation for her canonization.

== Life ==
Mattia de Nazarei was born on 1 March 1253 to noble parents as the daughter of Count Gualtiero Nazarei and Sibilla. She preferred a simple life and rejected all pomp of court life that demonstrated what she felt was excessive wealth.

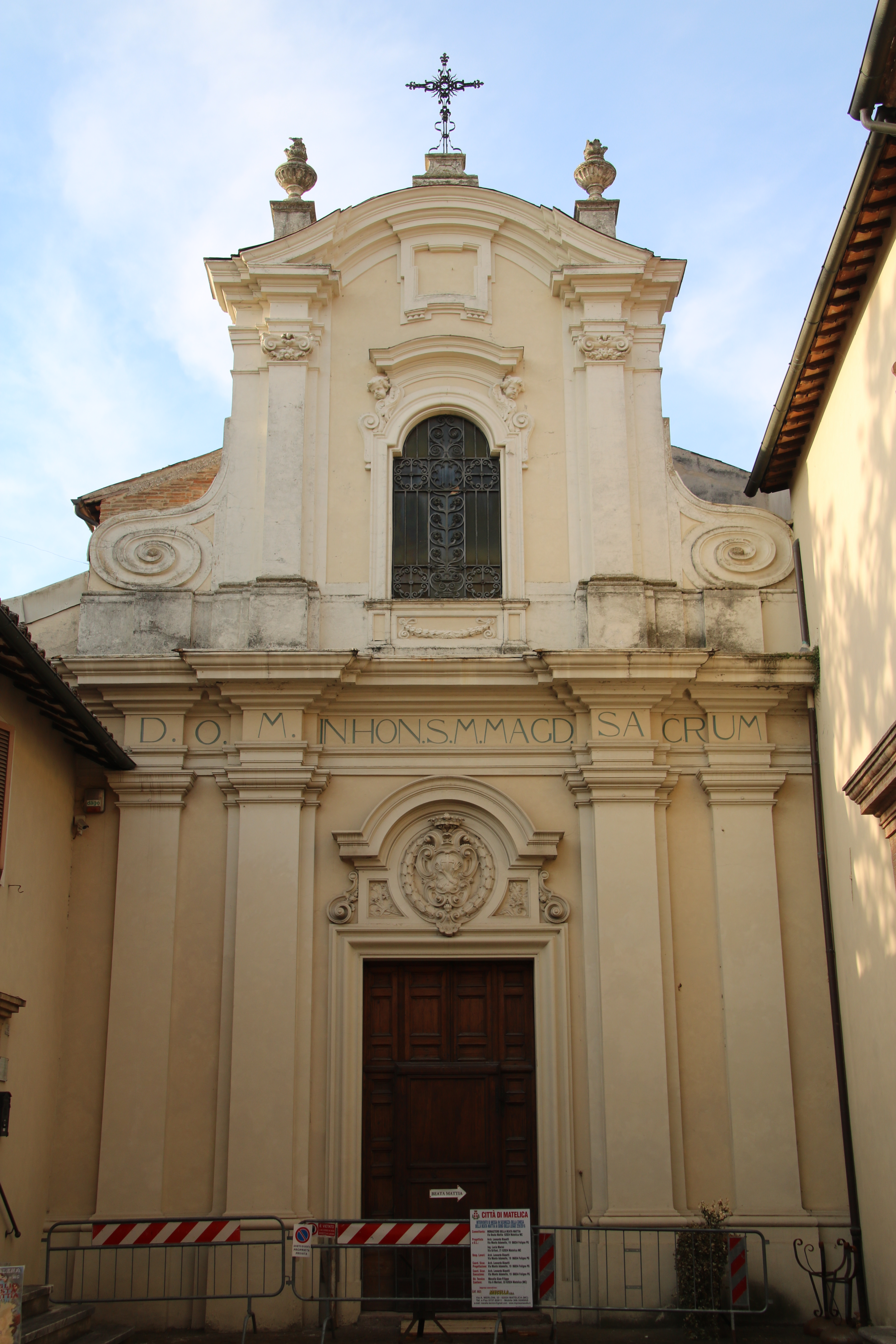
Santa Maddalena

At the age of eighteen she was put into an arranged marriage and when she heard she fled home to the convent of Santa Maddalena at Matelica. It was there that she became a Benedictine nun and served as its abbess for four decades from 1279. She feared her father's retribution for her fleeing and remained hidden until he found her. But her father was impressed with her that he allowed her to remain and the two reconciled. She took her solemn profession on 10 August 1271. The convent later adopted the rule of the Poor Clares.

She died on 28 December 1319 in Matelica. The house was renamed "Beata Matthias" in her honor in 1758.

She was reinterred near the high altar of her convent chapel and was exhumed in 1536. It was found incorrupt and also was seen sweating. The remains were again exhumed in 1756 and still found to be incorrupt.

== Beatification process ==
Mattia de Nazarei gained a reputation for holiness and was regarded as a saint. The cause of canonization culminated with her beatification on 27 July 1765 after Pope Clement XIII confirmed her cult.

The cause reopened and the local process closed on 15 October 2008 and was ratified in 2010. She must be declared Venerable with the recognition of her life of heroic virtue before the investigation into the miracle for canonization can occur.

A miracle attributed to her was investigated on a local process and was ratified on 14 November 2014.

There were beliefs that the miracle attributed to her would be approved in 2015 and would allow for her canonization on 1 March 2016.
