= Luke 2 =

- ← chapter 1 chapter 3 →
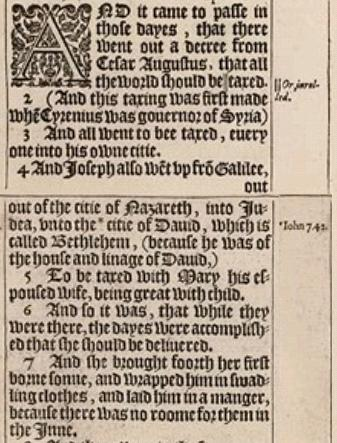
- Luke 2:1–7 in the original King James Version showing verse 2 parenthetical
- Book: Gospel of Luke
- Category: Gospel
- Christian Bible part: New Testament
- Order in the Christian part: 3

Luke 2 is the second chapter of the Gospel of Luke in the New Testament, traditionally attributed to Luke the Evangelist, a companion of Paul the Apostle on his missionary journeys. It contains an account of Jesus's birth in Bethlehem, "its announcement and celebration", his presentation in the Second Temple, and an incident from his childhood. Verses 1–14 are often read during services of worship on Christmas Day.

== Text ==
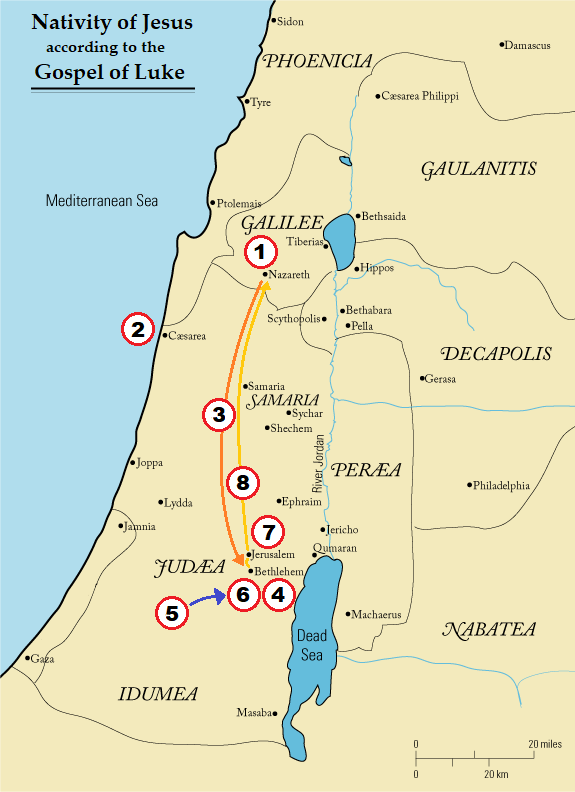
Map of the events in the Nativity of Jesus narrative found in the Gospel according to Luke. Legend: 1. Annunciation to Mary in Nazareth. 2. Census of Quirinius (historically carried out by prefect of Judea from Caesarea) 3. Joseph and Mary travel from Nazareth to Bethlehem 4. Birth of Jesus in Bethlehem 5. Annunciation to the shepherds ('nearby' Bethlehem, Luke 2:8) 6. Adoration of the shepherds in Bethlehem 7. Presentation of Jesus at the Temple in Jerusalem 8. Joseph, Mary and Jesus return home to Nazareth.

The original text was written in Koine Greek. This chapter is divided into 52 verses.

=== Textual witnesses ===
Some early manuscripts containing the text of this chapter are:

- Papyrus 4 (AD 150–175; extant verses: 1; 6–7)
- Codex Vaticanus (AD 325–350; complete)
- Codex Sinaiticus (330–360; complete)
- Codex Bezae (~400; complete)
- Codex Washingtonianus (~400; complete)
- Codex Alexandrinus (400–440; complete)
- Codex Ephraemi Rescriptus (~450; extant verses 1–4, 43–52)

== Jesus's birth (verses 1–7) ==
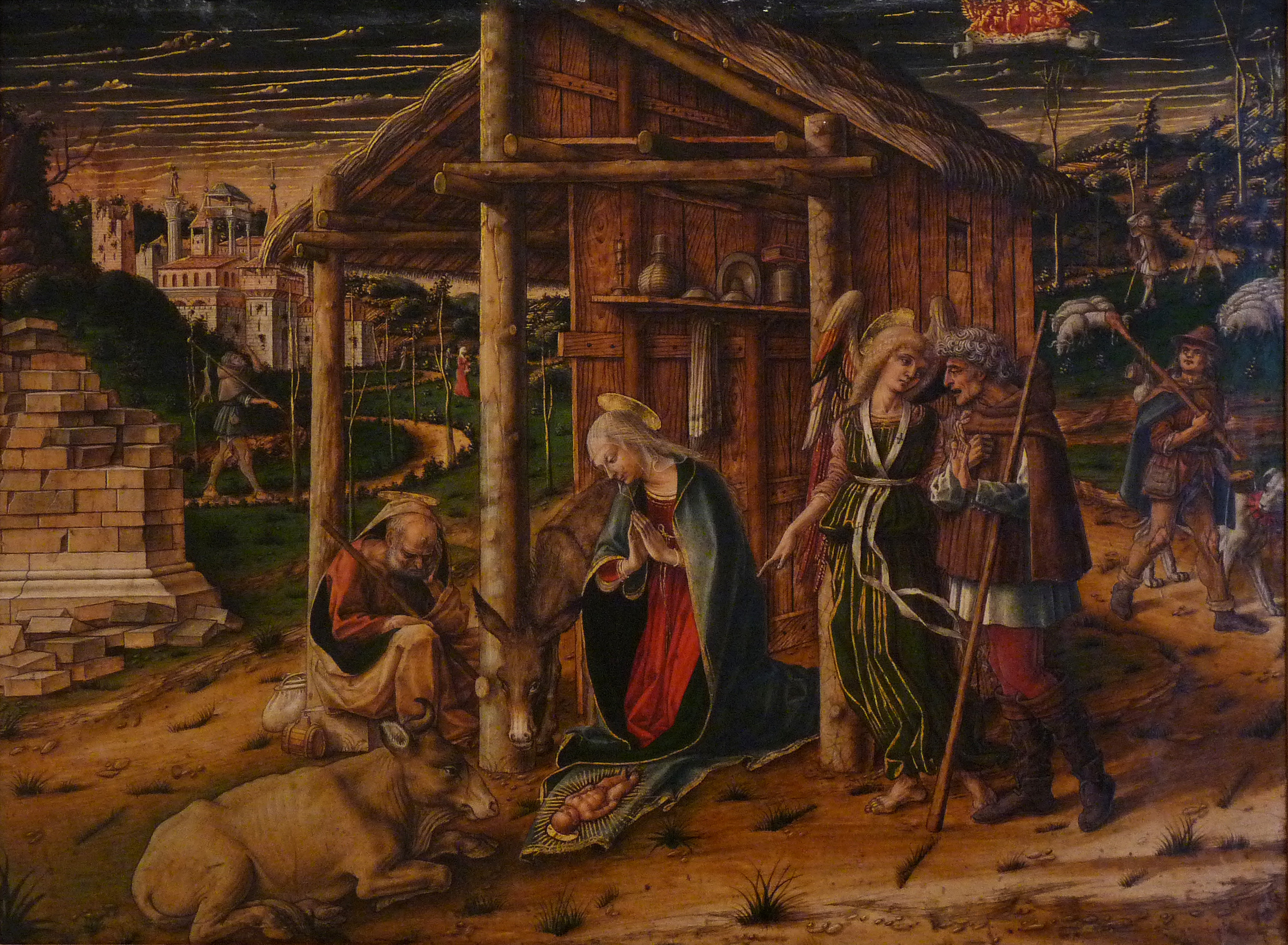
Adoration of the shepherds, by Carlo Crivelli (1490, Musée des Beaux-Arts de Strasbourg)

According to the Gospel of Luke, Caesar Augustus ordered a census be conducted of the ".. entire Roman World", during (or possibly before) the governorship of Quirinius (or "Cyrenius") in Syria, and this is the reason that Joseph and Mary, who lived in Nazareth, were in Bethlehem, King David's place of birth, when Jesus was born. Many English translations suggest that the purpose of the census was for everyone to be registered, but the King James Version and others state that everyone was to be taxed. The Expanded Bible suggests that the register was compiled for taxation. The accuracy of this account of the timing of the birth of Jesus has been disputed by many modern scholars. Quirinius was not governor of Syria until 6–7 CE. The suggestion that the census therefore took place before Quirinius's governorship is made by biblical scholar John Nolland as a way of resolving a historical difficulty about the timing of Jesus's birth in relation to this census. Jesuit theologian Joseph Fitzmyer, however, argues that this is not a natural reading of the Greek and "has about it something of the air of desperation".

=== Verse 2 ===
And this taxing was first made when Cyrenius was governor of Syria

This sentence is bracketed as a parenthetical explanation in the King James Version.

=== Verse 3 ===
So all went to be registered, everyone [went] to his own city:

Most texts refer to his own πολιν (polin, "city"), while Codex Bezae refers to his own πατρίδα (patrida) or "homeland".

=== Verse 5 ===
[Joseph went ...] to be registered with Mary, with his betrothed wife, who was with child.

Although a reading of Luke 1:32 suggests that Mary may have been herself "sprung from the lineage of David", and Bethlehem would also therefore be "her own city", it does appear that the evangelist's meaning is that she traveled to Bethlehem in order to accompany her betrothed husband. According to the narrative in chapter 1, Mary had travelled from Nazareth to a city in the hill country of Judah to visit her cousin Elizabeth, and then returned to Nazareth, then travelled again with Joseph from Nazareth to Bethlehem.

=== Verse 7 ===
And she brought forth her firstborn son, and wrapped him in swaddling clothes, and laid him in a manger; because there was no room for them in the inn.

- "Swaddling clothes" refers to "strips of linen that would be wrapped around the arms and legs of an infant to keep the limbs protected".
- "Manger": or "feed trough".
- "The inn" is translated from the Greek word κατάλυμα, kataluma, which may is "flexible" in its use. It may mean "guest room". In the Greek Septuagint and New Testament texts it may refer to a variety of places for lodging. Joseph and Mary could have planned to stay with relatives in Bethlehem, but the "guest rooms" in the houses would have been filled beyond capacity with all the other relatives who had to journey to Bethlehem for the census; Bethlehem was not large and there was simply no other place to stay. The paraphrase used in The Message (1993ff), "there was no room in the hostel", has been called "subversive" (in a positive sense) by one Methodist writer.

== The angels and shepherds (verses 8–20) ==
Luke then tells of shepherds working at night nearby (in the same region, or the same country), who are visited by an angel who tells them that in Bethlehem, the "...town of David, a saviour who is Christ the Lord" had been born. Bede notes that in the Old Testament, angelic visits typically occurred at night and not in the daytime.

=== Verse 10 ===
Then the angel said to them, "Do not be afraid, for behold, I bring you good tidings of great joy which will be to all people".

=== Verse 11 ===
"For there is born to you this day in the city of David a Savior, who is Christ the Lord."

"A multitude of the heavenly host" appear, praising God and saying "Glory to God in the highest, and on earth peace..." There is some variation in how the latter part of the sentence is translated, the most usual modern interpretations being "... and goodwill to men", "... towards men of goodwill" or "... to those he favours". The American Standard Version, for example, has "...among men in whom he is well pleased", which corresponds to the third reading. The line is the opening part of the Greater Doxology, and as such is important in the main rites of the Christian church.

The angels then return to heaven, and the shepherds go "even unto Bethlehem", to see for themselves and find Joseph and Mary and the infant Jesus. They then "...spread the word..." about the angels and Jesus, then return to their flocks. It is generally considered significant that this message was given to shepherds, who were located on the lower rungs of the social ladder in first-century Palestine. Contrasting with the more powerful characters mentioned in the Nativity, such as the Emperor Augustus, they seem to reflect Mary's words in the Magnificat: "He has brought down the mighty from their thrones and exalted those of humble estate." The phrase "peace to men on whom his favor rests" has been interpreted both as expressing a restriction to a particular group of people that God has chosen, and inclusively, as God displaying favor to the world.

Luke does not mention the visit of the Magi, the Massacre of the Innocents, or the escape of Jesus' family to Egypt, which are found in Matthew 2.

== Circumcision and naming (verse 21) ==
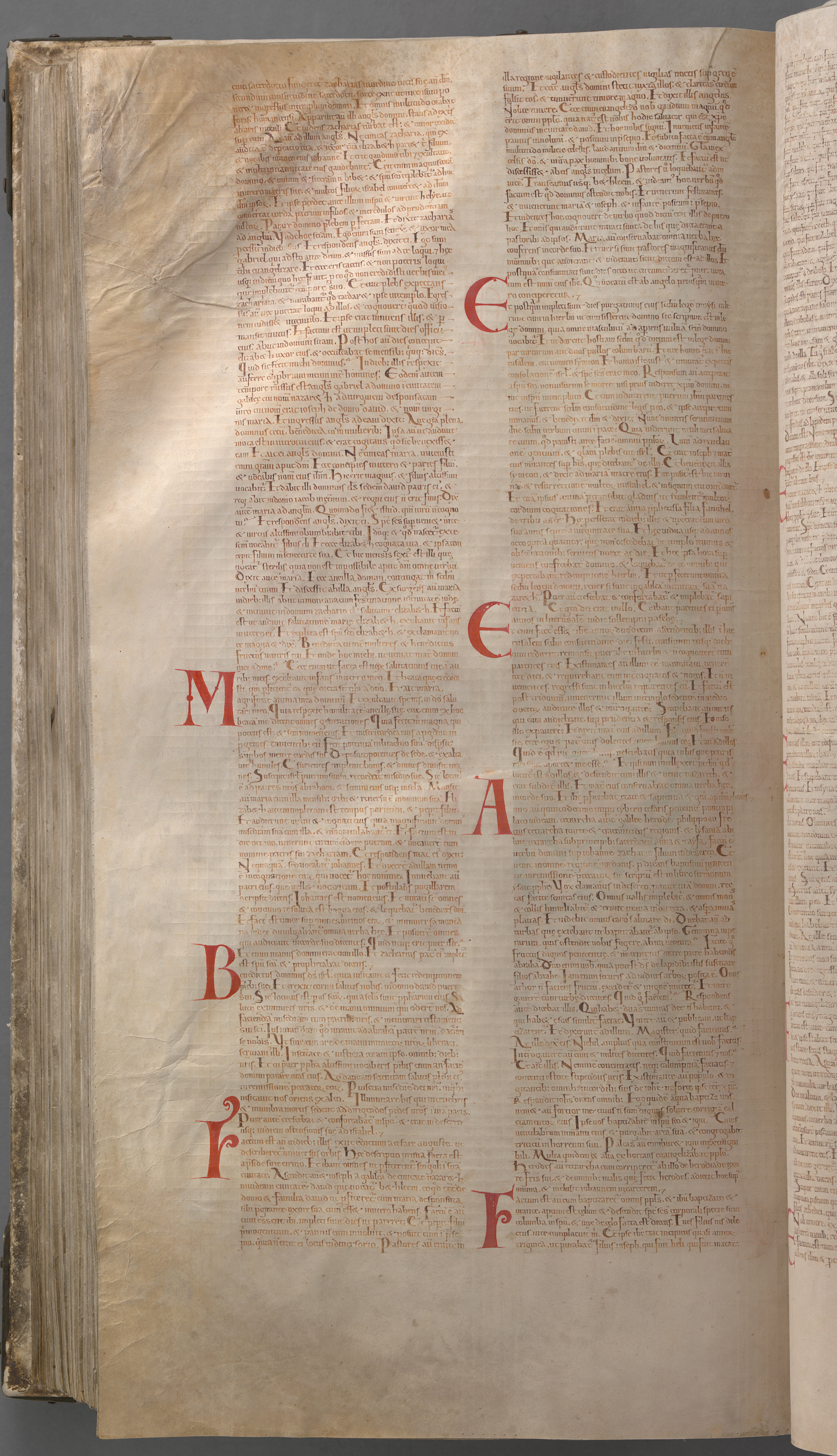
The Latin text of Luke 1:8–3:23 in Codex Gigas (13th century)

Luke 2:21 tells how Joseph and Mary have their baby circumcised on the eighth day after birth, and name him Jesus, as Gabriel had told Mary to do in Luke 1:31. Protestant theologian Jeremy Taylor argues that Jesus's circumcision proved his human nature while fulfilling the law of Moses and had Jesus been uncircumcised, it would have made Jews substantially less receptive to his Evangelism.

== Presentation in the Temple (verses 22–38) ==
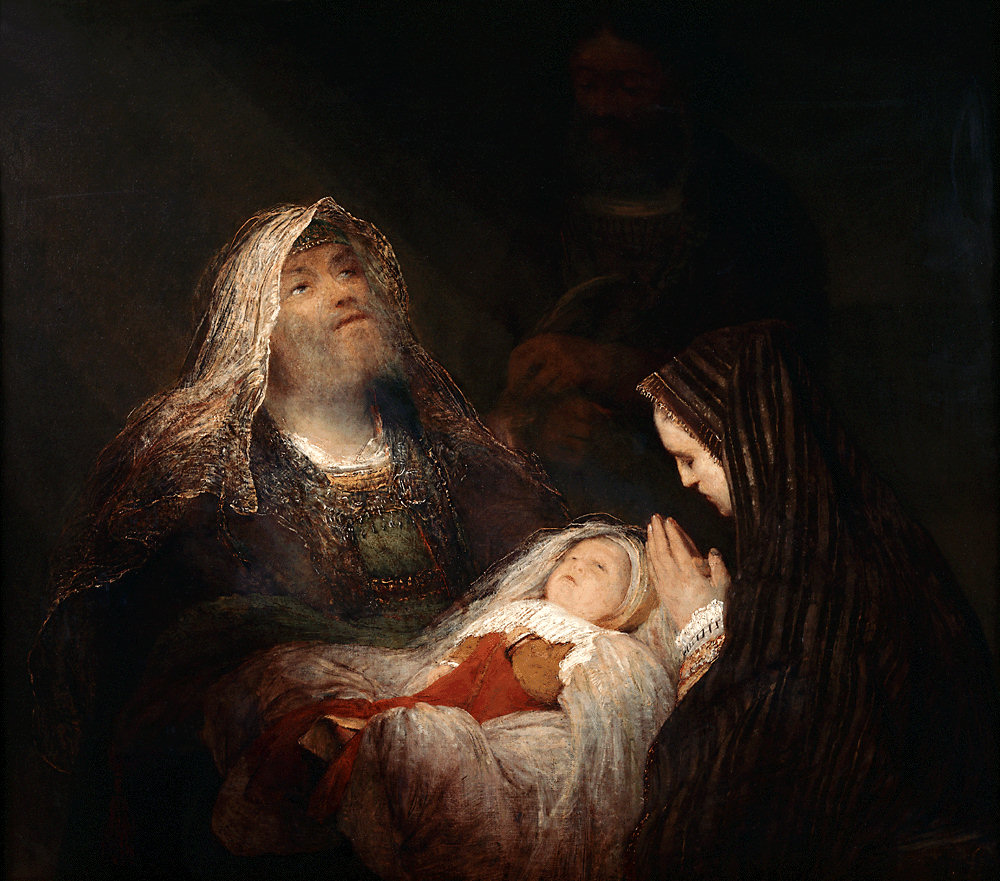
Simeon's Song of Praise (also showing Anna) by Aert de Gelder, around 1700–1710.

=== Verse 22 ===
And when the days of her purification according to the law of Moses were accomplished, they brought him to Jerusalem, to present him to the Lord;

The law in Leviticus 12:1–8 requires that after the birth of a male child, a mother is regarded as 'unclean' for seven days and is required to stay at home for a further 33 days, after which, on the 40th day, a sacrifice is to be offered for her purification, which can only be done in Jerusalem. Some translations refer to "their purification", but it was Mary, not her child, who needed to be purified, and even though Mary was not polluted by the conception, bearing, and giving birth of Jesus, who had no impurity in his nature (although he was made sin for his people), she still came under this law of purification, so that all possible requirements of the law were fulfilled (cf. Galatians 4:4).

"The days of her purification" or "her purifying" (Hebrew: ימי טהרה, yə-mê ṭā-ho-rāh, in Leviticus 12:4 and 12:6) are to be fulfilled or accomplished at the time described by Maimonides:

a new mother does not bring her offering on the fortieth day for a male, nor on the eightieth day for a female, but after her sun is set: and she brings her offering on the morrow, which is the forty first for a male, and the eighty first for a female: and this is the day of which it is said, [in] Leviticus 12:6, and "when the days of her purifying are fulfilled for a son, or for a daughter, she shall bring ...

This was the time when they, Joseph and Mary, brought the child Jesus, to the Temple in Jerusalem to complete Mary's ritual purification and to provide the sacrifice specified in the Law of Moses, in which she took the option provided for poor people (those who could not afford a lamb) in Leviticus 12:8, sacrificing "a pair of doves or two young pigeons." This was done in the eastern gate, called the gate of Nicanor, specially for:

women, suspected of adultery, to drink, and purified new mothers, and cleansed the lepers.

Then, they presented Jesus to God through the priest, his representative. Here Mary appeared with her firstborn son, the true Messiah, marking the first time of Jesus' coming into his temple, as was foretold (Malachi 3:1).

The presentation of Jesus in the Temple officially inducts him into Judaism and concludes the birth narrative in the Gospel of Luke. Within the account, "Luke's narration of the Presentation in the Temple combines the purification rite with the Jewish ceremony of the redemption of the firstborn (Luke 2:23–24)."

In the Temple, they meet Simeon and Anna. Simeon had been waiting for the Christ, and believes Jesus is him. Simeon prays the Nunc Dimittis (Canticle of Simeon) and tells Mary "This child is destined to cause the falling and rising of many in Israel, and to be a sign that will be spoken against, so that the thoughts of many hearts will be revealed. And a sword will pierce your own soul too." Anna, an old widowed woman who spent all her time in the temple praying, comes and praises Jesus as well.

== Return to Nazareth and early childhood (verses 39–40) ==
In verses 39–40, the family returns to Nazareth in Galilee, where Jesus grows and becomes strong and wise. He receives God's favour or grace. Unlike the apocryphal gospels, no preternatural stories of Jesus' childhood are found in Luke, or indeed any of the four canonical gospels. Verse 40 is echoed in verse 52: Lutheran pietist Johann Bengel suggests that verse 40 refers to the period from his first to his twelfth year, when Jesus grew in body, whereas verse 52 covers the period from his twelfth to his thirtieth year, when his progress is a spiritual increase towards "full perfection".

== The boy Jesus in the Temple (verses 41–50) ==
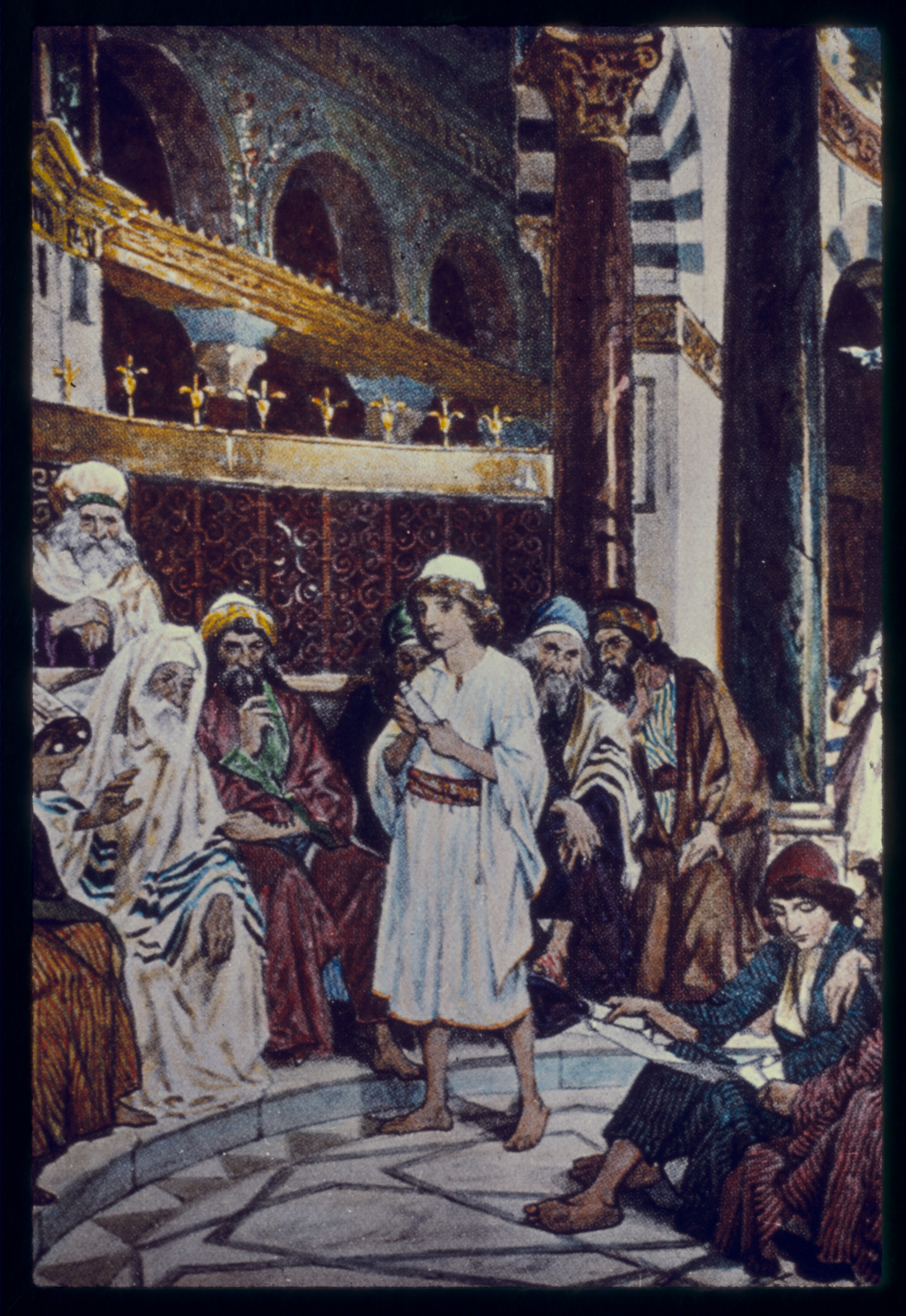
"Jesus... seeking instruction from the doctors of the law" (Luke 2:41–50) by William Hole (1846–1917). G. Eric and Edith Matson Photograph Collection.

The Gospel then provides the only story of Jesus's childhood in the Canonical Gospels. When Jesus is twelve he travels with his family to Jerusalem for the Passover festival. Then they leave with a large group of their relatives and friends and after a day his parents realize Jesus is not with them. They go back to Jerusalem and, after three days of searching, find him in the temple talking with the temple teachers. His parents scold him for running off, but Jesus replies that they should have known where he was. "Didn't you know I had to be in my Father's house? (or about my Father's business)?" The Greek is not specific: εν τοις του πατρος μου (en tois tou patros mou). Nicoll comments that "about my Father's business" is a more accurate translation, but "the place or house of my Father" carries "the real meaning Jesus wished to suggest". His family fails to understand what he is talking about. They all then go to Nazareth.

== Later childhood and youth (verses 51–52) ==
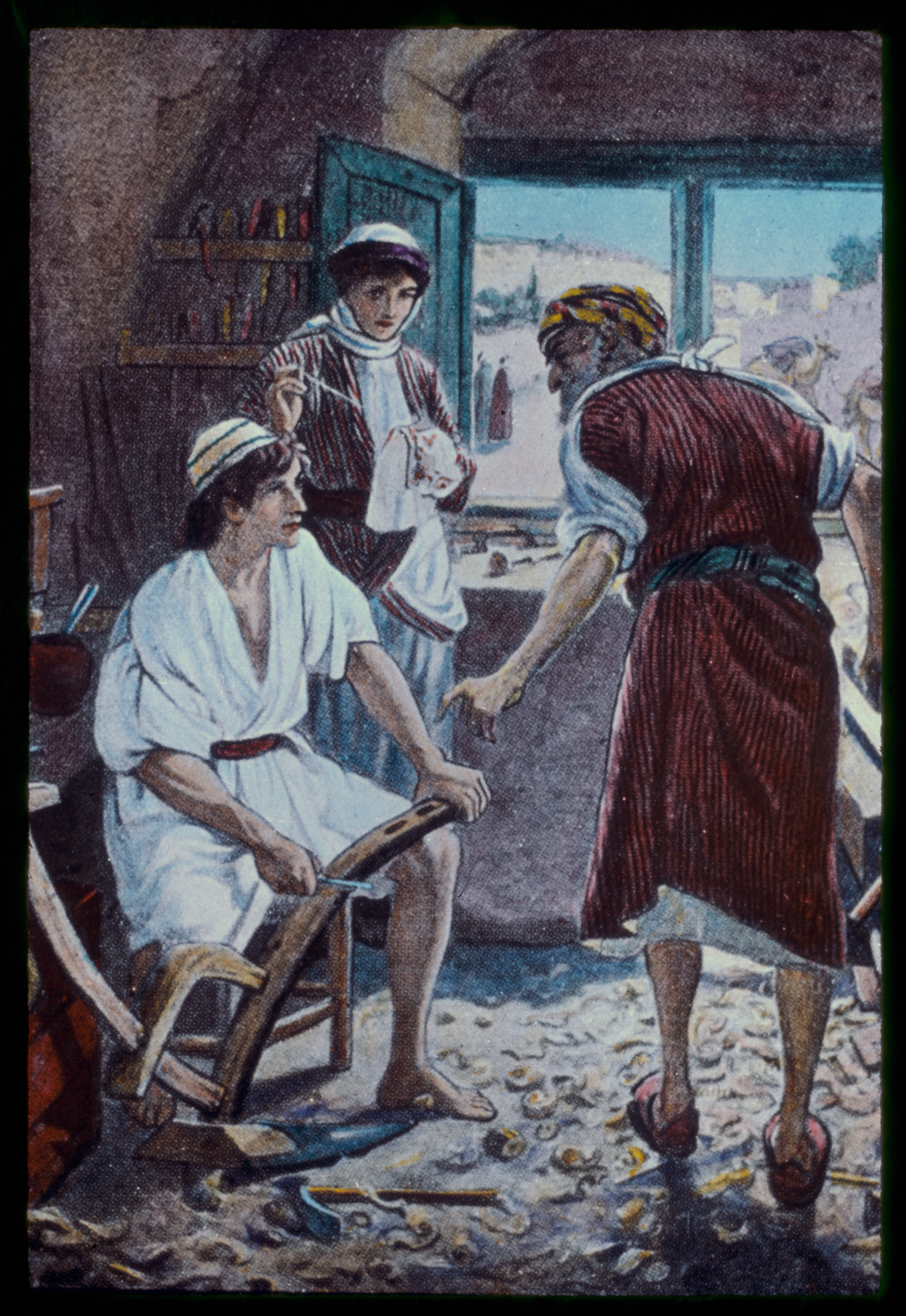
"Jesus returneth with his parents to Nazareth" (Luke 2:51–52) by William Hole (1846–1917). G. Eric and Edith Matson Photograph Collection.

Jesus returns to Nazareth and is "submissive" to his parents. Mary reflected on and treasured "all these things": H. E. Ryle notes that these words reflect how the patriarch Jacob pondered on his son Joseph's account of his dreams in Genesis 37.

The boy continues to grow and flourish both in wisdom and stature, and in the favour of God and man. This mirrors verse 40, and completes Jesus' early years. The next we see of him is in Chapter 3, verse 21, when he is baptised by John the Baptist.

== Uses ==
Verses 1–19 are commonly read during Nativity plays as part of the celebration of Christmas. Verses 29–32, the Nunc Dimittis, with the Gloria Patri, form part of Evening Prayer in the Church of England's Book of Common Prayer.

=== Music ===
The King James Version of verses 8–11 and 13–14 from this chapter is cited as text in the English-language oratorio "Messiah" by George Frideric Handel (HWV 56).

== See also ==
- Gloria in excelsis Deo
- Migdal Eder ("Tower of flock")
- Pidyon haben
- Related Bible parts: Micah 4, Micah 5, Matthew 2

== Sources ==
- Carson, D. A.; France, R. T.; Motyer, J. A.; Wenham, G. J., eds. (1994). "Luke". New Bible Commentary: 21st Century Edition (4, illustrated, reprint, revised ed.). Inter-Varsity Press. ISBN 9780851106489.

Preceded by Luke 1	Chapters of the Bible; Gospel of Luke	Succeeded by Luke 3
