= Diocese of Fabriano-Matelica =

Roman Catholic diocese in Italy

Coordinates: 43.3386°N 12.9085°E

Diocese of Fabriano-Matelica Dioecesis Fabrianensis-Mathelicensis

Catholic
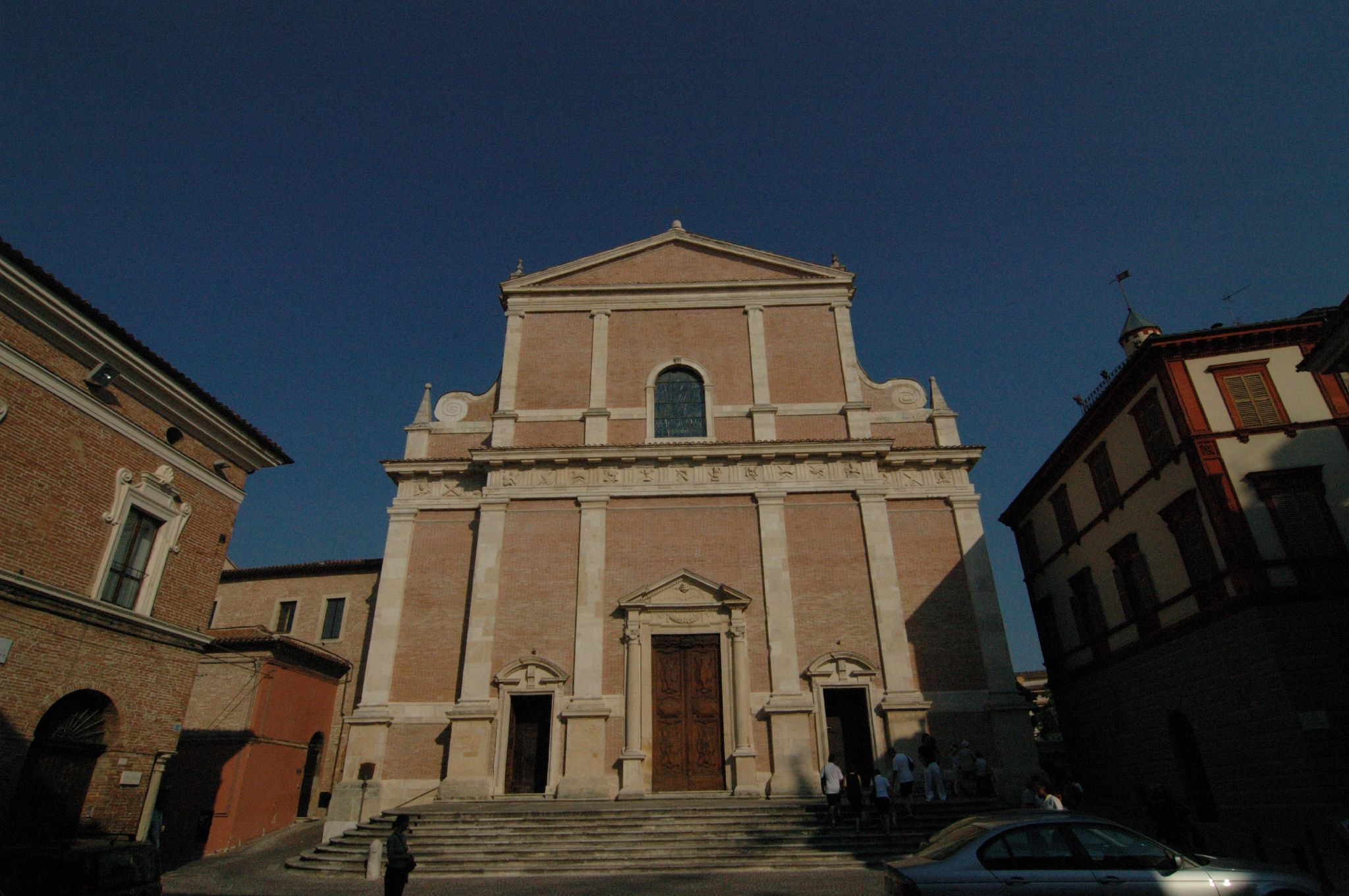
- Fabriano Cathedral

Location
- Country: Italy
- Ecclesiastical province: Ancona-Osimo

Statistics
- Area: 681 km^{2} (263 sq mi)
- Population: Total; Catholics: (as of 2021); 52,900 (est.); 50,500 (guess)
- Parishes: 58

Information
- Denomination: Catholic Church
- Rite: Roman Rite
- Established: 15 November 1728 (297 years ago)
- Cathedral: Basilica Cattedrale di S. Venanzio Martire
- Co-cathedral: Concattedrale di S. Maria Assunta
- Secular priests: 37 (diocesan); 15 (Religious Orders); 6 Permanent Deacons

Current leadership
- Pope: Leo XIV
- Bishop: Francesco Massara

Map

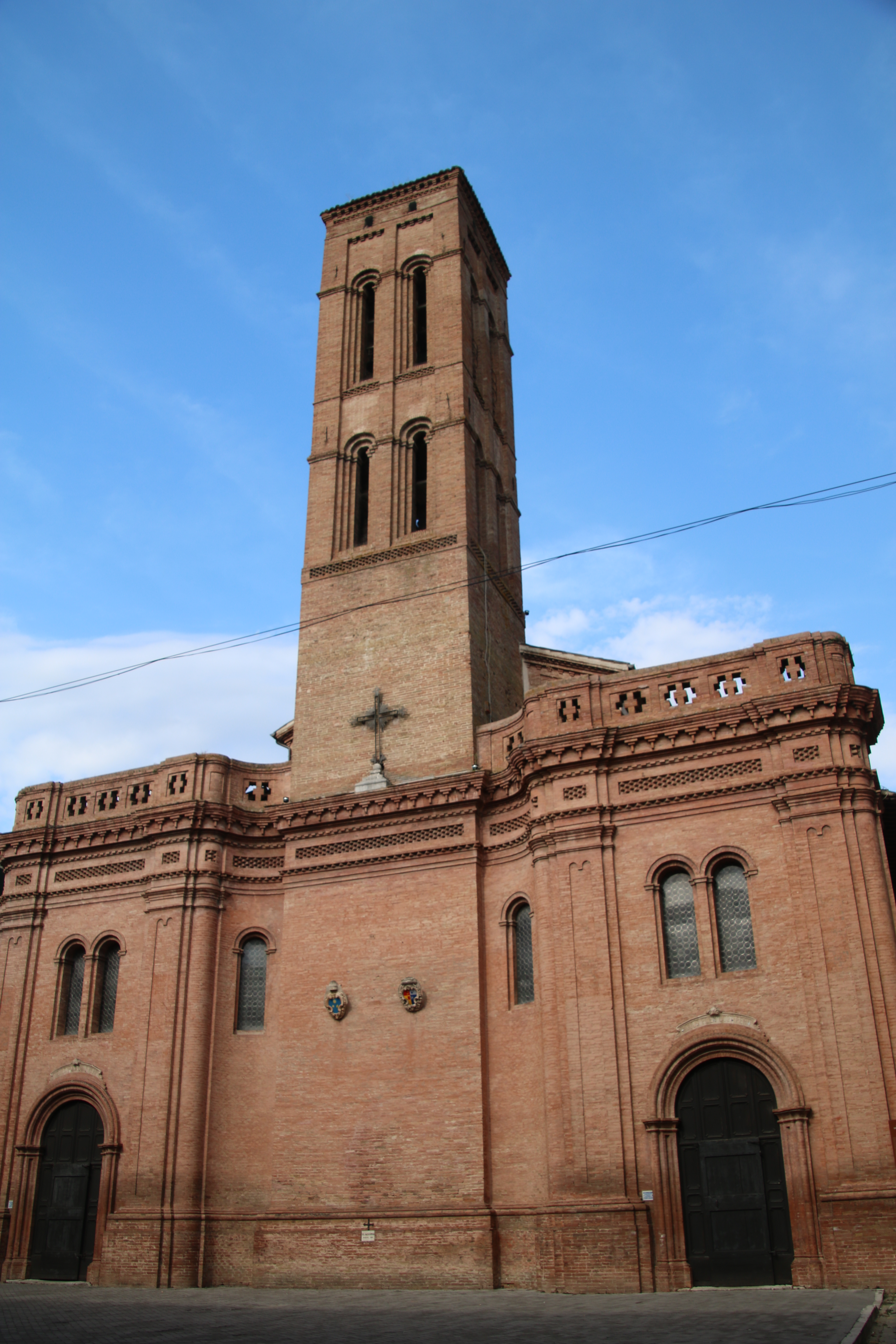
Cathedral of the Assumption, Matelica

The Diocese of Fabriano-Matelica (Latin: Dioecesis Fabrianensis-Mathelicensis) is a Latin Church diocese of the Catholic Church in the Marche has existed under this name since 1986. It is a suffragan of the archdiocese of Ancona-Osimo.

== History ==
Fabriano belongs to the medieval March of Ancona, and the modern province of Ancona. It is located approximately 56 km (35 mi) southwest and inland of the Adriatic port of Ancona, the capital of the March of Ancona. Fabriano is about 35 km (22 mi) north-northwest of Camerino by road.

Silvestro Guzzoli, the founder of the Congregation of the Sylvestrines, of the Order of Saint Benedict, is buried in the church of S. Benedict in the monastery of S. Silvestro at Monte Fano, three km. southwest of Fabriano, which he established in 1231, where Giuseppe dei Conti Atti and Ugo Laico, both Silvestrines, are also buried.

On 15 November 1728, Pope Benedict XIV established the town of Fabriano as the seat of a diocese, and the collegiate church of S. Venantius in Fabriano was constituted the cathedral of Fabriano. The new diocese of Fabriano was united aeque principaliter with the diocese of Camerino, from which its territory had been taken. Bishop Cosimo Torelli of Camerino became bishop of Camerino e Fabriano. Both dioceses continued to be directly subject to the Holy See (papacy), both politically and ecclesiastically.

The city of Fabriano in 1728 had a population of around 7,000 Catholics. Camerino's 18th century population was around 4,000. Fabriano had three parishes, twelve houses of male religious and nine houses of women religious. The diocese had fifteen towns (oppida) in its jurisdiction, and several country districts.

Bishop Francesco Viviani (1746–1767) held a diocesan synod for the dioceses of Camerino and Fabriano in 1748.

=== Matelica ===
In 487, Bishop Equitius of Matelica was at Rome; Basilius is recorded in 499; and in 551, Bishop Florentius accompanied Pope Vigilius to Constantinople. No other bishops of the ancient see are known. Until 1785, the territory of Matelica also was under the jurisdiction of Camerino. The town of Matelica was under the ecclesiastical jurisdiction of the diocese of Camerino until 8 July 1785, when Pope Pius VI re-established the old Diocese of Matelica and united it aeque principaliter with Fabriano.

In 1846, Bishop Francesco Faldi (1837–1858) held a synod for the diocese of Fabriano, and summoned the Chapter of the cathedral of Matelica to attend. They refused, and appealed to Rome, where the Sacred Congregation of the Council supported them against Fabriano.

Bishop Macario Sorini (1883–1893) held a diocesan synod for the diocese of Fabriano in the cathedral in Fabriano on 23–25 October 1884; he held another for the diocese of Matelica on 12–14 April 1885.

=== Reorganization of 1986 ===
In a decree of the Second Vatican Council, it was recommended that dioceses be reorganized to take into account modern developments. As part of the project begun on orders from Pope John XXIII, and continued under his successors, to reduce the number of dioceses in Italy and to rationalize their borders in terms of modern population changes and shortages of clergy, the diocese of Matelica was united to the diocese of Fabriano. The change was approved by Pope John Paul II in an audience of 27 September 1986, and by a decree of the Sacred Congregation of Bishops of the Papal Curia on 30 September 1986. Its name was to be Dioecesis Fabrianensis-Mathelicensis. The seat of the diocese was to be in Fabriano. The former cathedral in Matelica was to have the honorary title of co-cathedral, and its chapter was to be the Capitulum Concathedralis. There was to be only one episcopal curia, one seminary, one ecclesiastical tribunal; and all the clergy were to be incardinated in the diocese of Fabriano-Matelica. The diocese of Matelica was completely suppressed.

== Bishops ==
=== Diocese of Camerino and Fabriano ===
Erected: 15 November 1728
Latin Name: Camerinus et Fabrianensis

- Cosma Torelli (1728–1736 Died)
- Ippolito de Rossi (1736–1746)
- Francesco Viviani (1746–1767)
- Luigi Amici (1768–1785 Resigned)

=== Diocese of Fabriano e Matelica ===
United: 8 July 1785 with the Diocese of Matelica
Latin Name: Fabrianensis et Mathelicensis
Immediately Subject to the Holy See

- Nicola Pietro Andrea Zoppetti, O.E.S.A. (1785–1796)

Sede Vacante (1796–1800)

- Giovanni Francesco Capelletti (1800–1806)
- Domenico Buttaoni (1806–1822)
- Pietro Balducci, C.M. (1822–1837)
- Francesco Faldi (1837–1858)
- Antonio Maria Valenziani (1858–1876)
- Leopoldo Angelo Santanché, O.F.M. (1876–1883)
- Macario Sorini (1883–1893 Resigned)
- Aristide Golfieri (1895)
- Luciano Gentilucci (1895–1909)
- Pietro Zanolini (1910–1913 Appointed, Bishop of Lodi)
- Andrea Cassulo (1914–1921)
- Luigi Ermini (1921–1945)
- Lucio Crescenzi (1945–1960)
- Macario Tinti (1960–1978 Retired)
- Luigi Scuppa (1978–2001)

=== Diocese of Fabriano-Matelica ===
Combined: 30 September 1986 into one diocese
Latin Name: Fabrianensis-Mathelicensis

- Giancarlo Vecerrica (2002–2016 Retired)
- Stefano Russo (2016–2019)

Stefano Russo (2019–2020) Administrator
Francesco Massara (2019–2020) Administrator

- Francesco Massara (2020– )

== See also ==
- Roman Catholic Diocese of Matelica

== Bibliography ==
=== Reference works for bishops ===
- Gams, Pius Bonifatius (1873). Series episcoporum Ecclesiae catholicae: quotquot innotuerunt a beato Petro apostolo (in Latin). Ratisbon: Typis et Sumptibus Georgii Josephi Manz. p. 704.
- Ritzler, Remigius; Sefrin, Pirminus (1952). Hierarchia catholica medii et recentis aevi. Vol. Tomus V (1667-1730). Patavii: Messagero di S. Antonio.
- Ritzler, Remigius; Sefrin, Pirminus (1958). Hierarchia catholica medii et recentis aevi. Vol. Tomus VI (1730-1799). Patavii: Messagero di S. Antonio.
- Ritzler, Remigius; Sefrin, Pirminus (1968). Hierarchia Catholica medii et recentioris aevi (in Latin). Vol. VII (1800–1846). Monasterii: Libreria Regensburgiana.
- Remigius Ritzler; Pirminus Sefrin (1978). Hierarchia catholica Medii et recentioris aevi (in Latin). Vol. VIII (1846–1903). Il Messaggero di S. Antonio.
- Pięta, Zenon (2002). Hierarchia catholica medii et recentioris aevi (in Latin). Vol. IX (1903–1922). Padua: Messagero di San Antonio. ISBN 978-88-250-1000-8.

=== Studies ===
- Cappelletti, Giuseppe (1848). Le chiese d'Italia: dalla loro origine sino ai nostri giorni (in Italian). Vol. Tomo settimo. Venezia: G. Antonelli. pp. 635–658.
- Lanzoni, Francesco (1927). Le diocesi d'Italia dalle origini al principio del secolo VII (an. 604). Faenza: F. Lega. (in Italian)
