= Madonna of the Swallow =

Painting by Carlo Crivelli

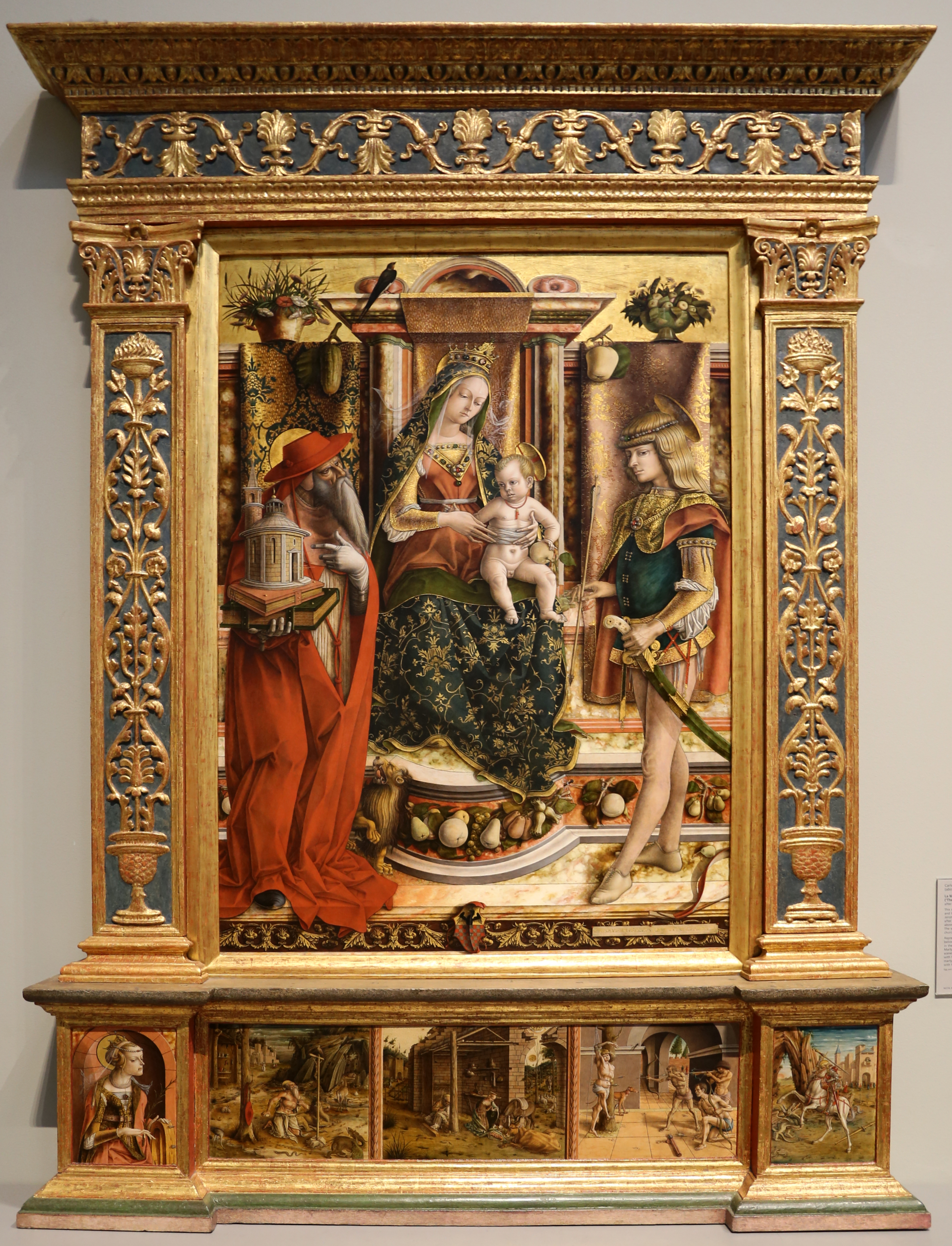
- Artist: Carlo Crivelli
- Year: c. 1490-1492
- Medium: oil on panel
- Dimensions: 175 cm × 151 cm (69 in × 59 in)
- Location: National Gallery, London

Madonna of the Swallow (Italian - Madonna della rondine) is a painting by Carlo Crivelli. It is named after the swallow perched on the top left hand corner of the Madonna's throne - the bird was a symbol of the Resurrection. It was commissioned by Ranuzio Ottoni and Giorgio di Giacomo for the church of San Francesco in Matelica in March 1490 - Ottoni was Lord of Matelica and Giacomo was guardian of the local Franciscan monastery. It was completed between 1490 and 1492. It is now in the National Gallery, London, who bought it in 1862.

The central panel shows the Madonna and Child in a granite, porphyry and marble throne, with Jerome to their left and saint Sebastian to their right. At the base is the Ottoni coat of arms and the signature CAROLVS CRIVELLVS VENETVS MILES PINXIT. The predella survives and shows (from left to right) Catherine of Alexandria, Jerome, the Nativity, the Martyrdom of St Sebastian and St George slaying the Dragon.

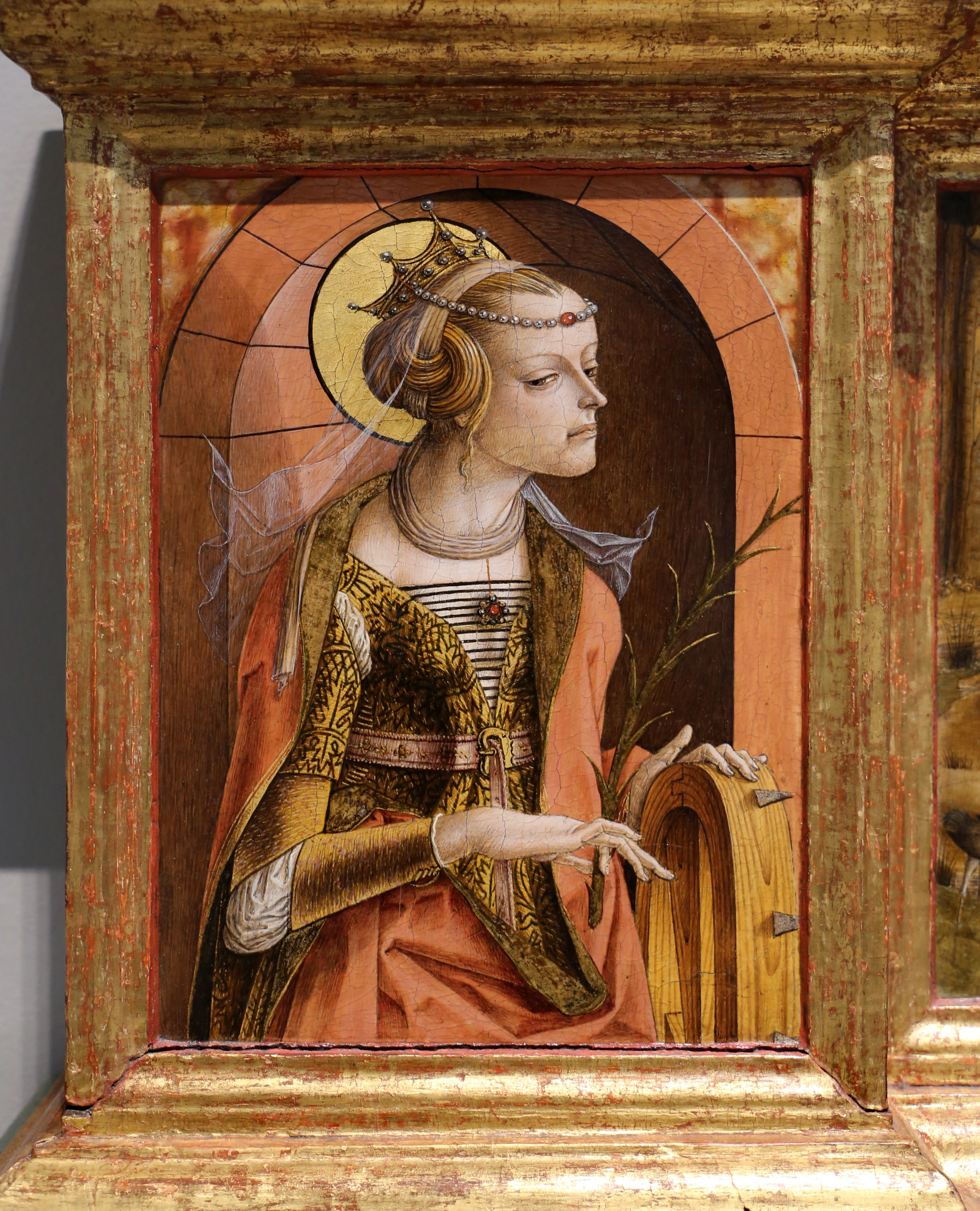
Catherine of Alexandria

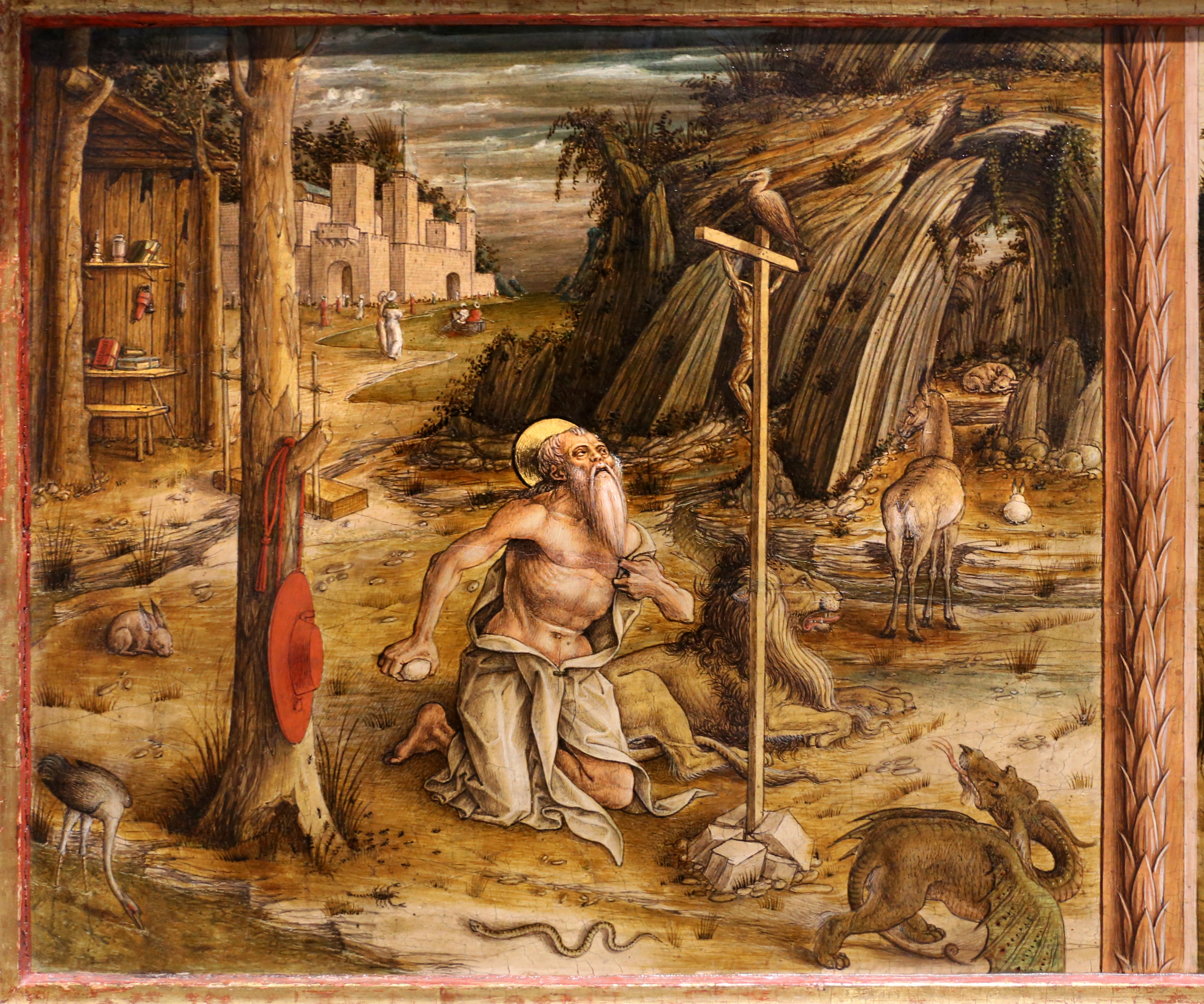
Jerome in the desert

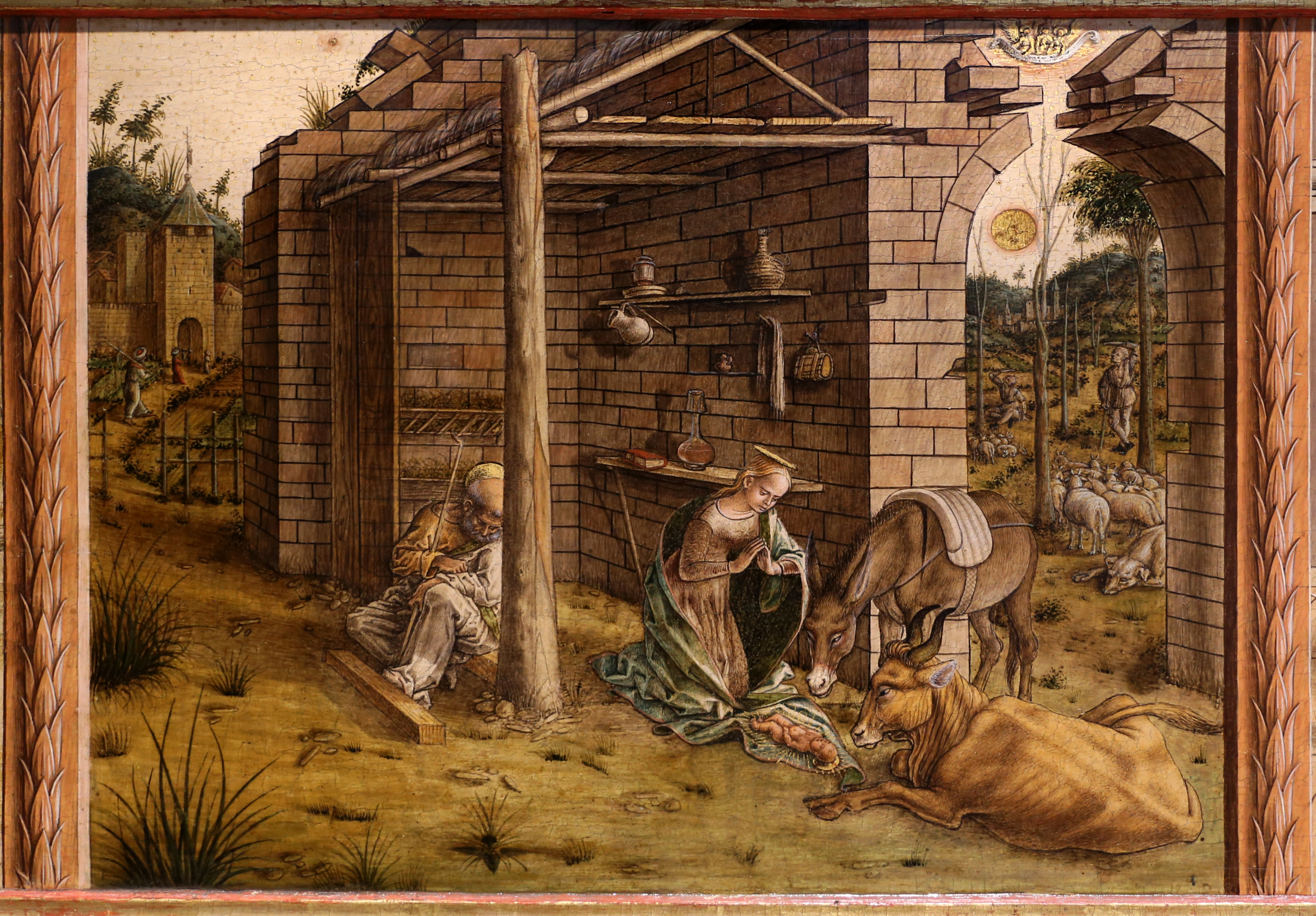
Nativity

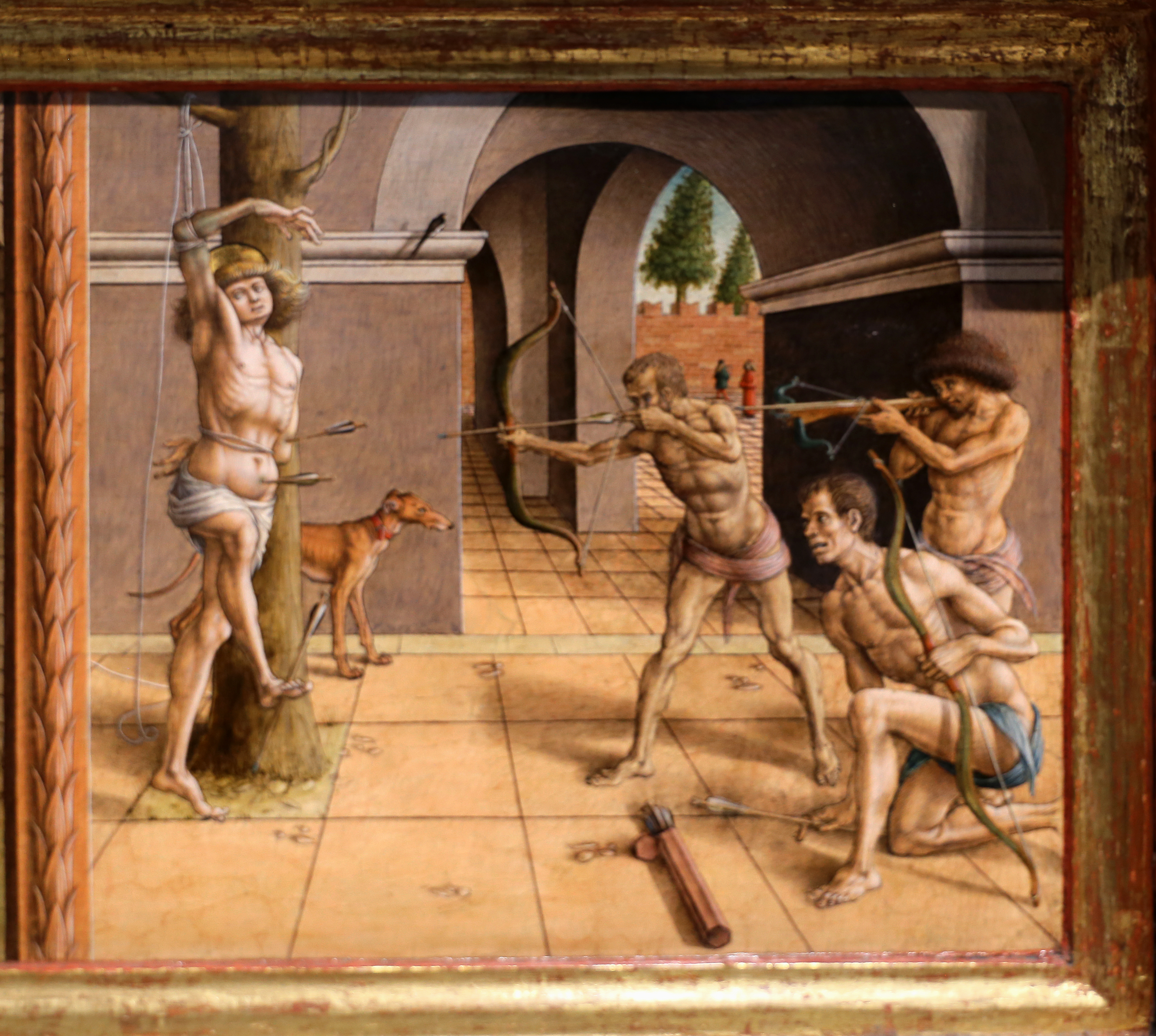
Martyrdom of St Sebastian

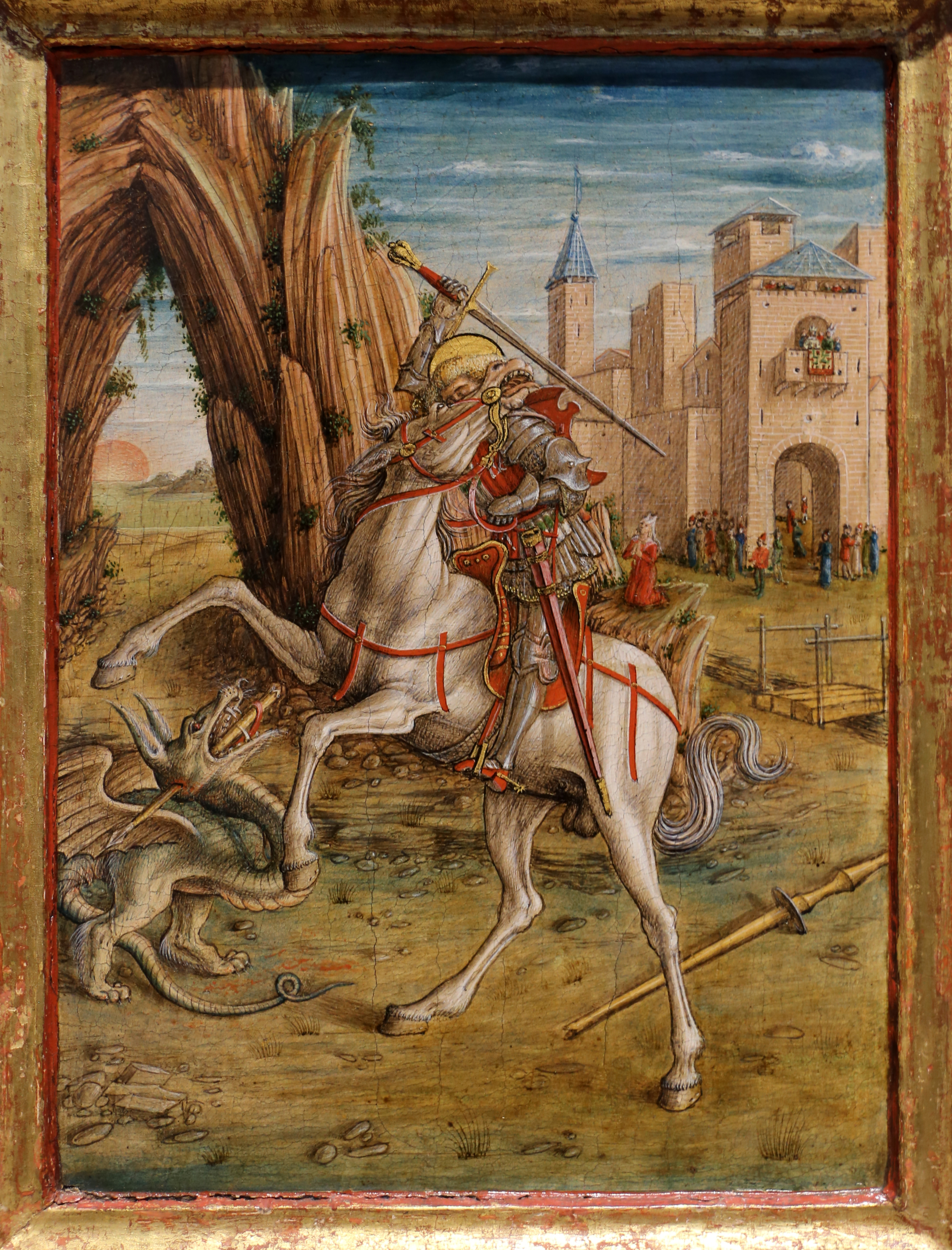
St George and the Dragon

== Sources (in French) ==
- Dictionnaire des sujets et des symboles dans l'Art, James Hall (1918-2007)
- Notice et photographie non recadrée
