= Pietro Zanolini =

Italian Catholic bishop

- Bishop of Lodi
- Church: Catholic Church
- Diocese: Fabriano-Matelica (1910–1913); Lodi (1913–1923)
- Appointed: 22 February 1910 (Fabriano-Matelica); 8 July 1913 (Lodi)
- Term ended: 8 July 1913 (Fabriano-Matelica); 6 December 1923 (Lodi)
- Predecessor: Luciano Gentilucci (Fabriano-Matelica); Giovanni Battista Rota
- Successor: Andrea Cassulo (Fabriano-Matelica); Ludovico Antomelli (Lodi)

Orders
- Consecration: 5 May 1910 by Luigi Pellizzo

Personal details
- Born: 29 June 1864 Merlara
- Died: 6 December 1923 (aged 59)

Ordination history
History
Episcopal consecration
- Principal consecrator: Luigi Pellizzo
- Co-consecrators: Andrea Caron, Carlo Liviero
Episcopal succession
Bishops consecrated by Pietro Zanolini as principal consecrator
- Domenico Mezzadri: 22 August 1920

Pietro Zanolini (29 June 1864 – 6 December 1923) was an Italian Roman Catholic prelate. He was the bishop of the Diocese of Fabriano-Matelica from 1910 to 1913, and the bishop of the Diocese of Lodi from 1913 to his death in 1923.
