= Domenico Mezzadri =

Italian Bishop

Domenico Maria Mezzadri
- Bishop of Chioggia
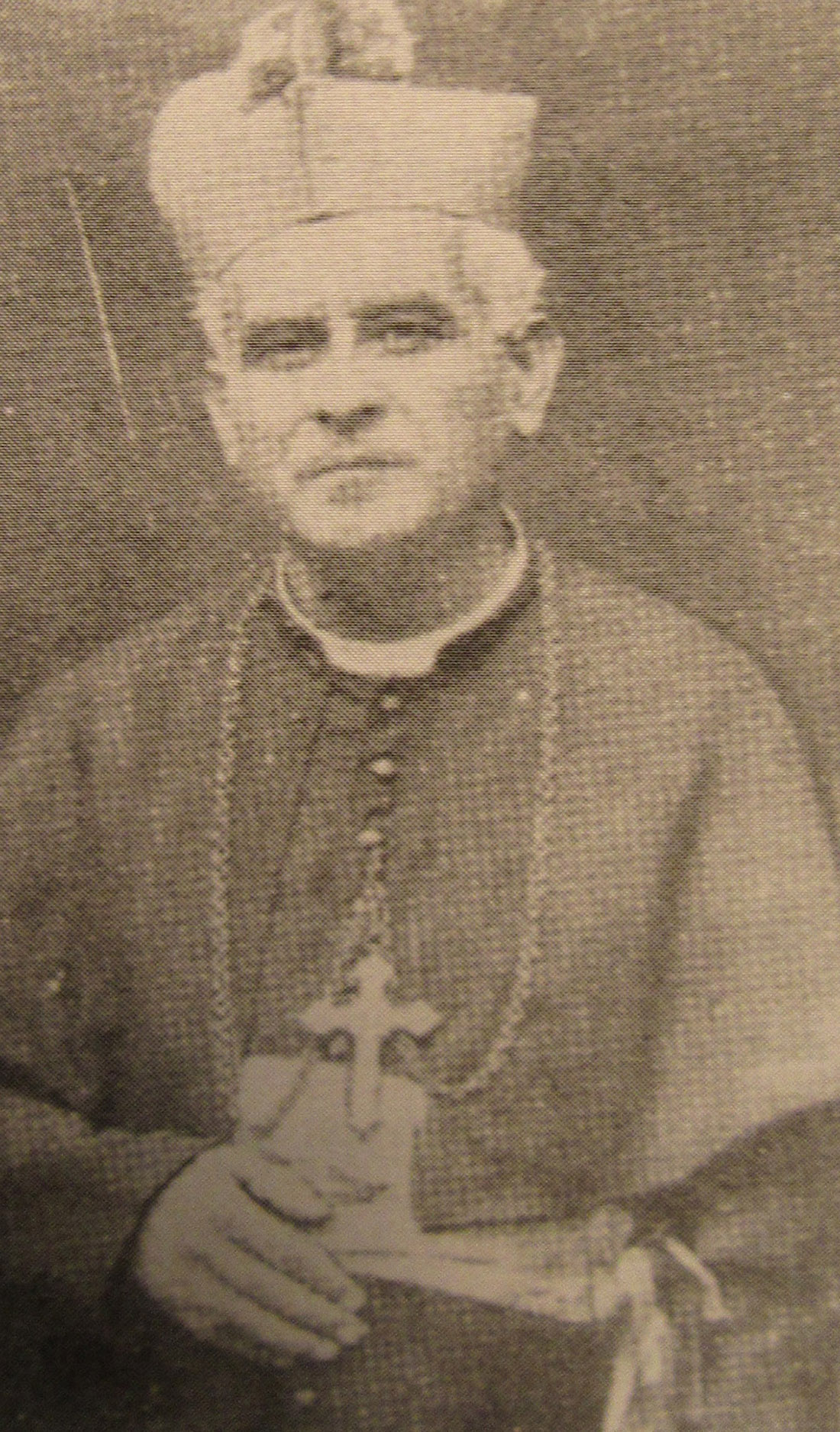
- Church: Roman Catholic Church
- See: Roman Catholic Diocese of Chioggia
- In office: 1920–1936
- Predecessor: Antonio Bassani
- Successor: Giacinto Giovanni Ambrosi

Orders
- Ordination: 11 August 1889
- Consecration: 23 October 1920 by Mgr Pietro Zanolini

Personal details
- Born: 30 January 1867 San Rocco al Porto, Italy
- Died: 8 December 1936 (aged 69) Chioggia, Italy
- Buried: Chioggia Cathedral
- Denomination: Roman Catholic Church
- Occupation: bishop
- Profession: priest
- Coat of arms

Styles of Domenico Maria Mezzadri
- Reference style: His Excellency
- Spoken style: Your Excellency
- Religious style: Bishop

Domenico Maria Mezzadri (11 August 1889 – 8 December 1936) was the Italian Bishop of the Roman Catholic Diocese of Chioggia from his appointment by Pope Benedict XV on 2 July 1920 until his death on 8 December 1936.

== Biography ==
Born in San Rocco al Porto in 1867, Mezzadri was ordained a Catholic priest on 11 August 1889; he was a priest in three parishes of the Diocese of Lodi. He was appointed bishop of Chioggia on 2 July 1920 and ordained Bishop on 22 August 1920. During his ministry as bishop he celebrated the first diocesan Eucharistic Congress, in 1923, and two pastoral visits, in 1922 and 1930, respectively. In 1927 he reopened the church of San Michele Brondolo for worship and in 1935 he consecrated the little church of the Capuchins in the cemetery of Chioggia.

He instituted a diocesan council of the Catholic movement.

He governed the diocese until his death on 8 December 1936 and was buried in the diocesan cathedral with his predecessors.

In Caselle Landi and Sant'Angelo Lodigiano, where he was parson at the beginning of 20th century, it has been dedicated a square and a street to him.

Catholic Church titles
Preceded by Antonio Bassani	Bishop of Chioggia; 1920–1936	Succeeded by Giacinto Giovanni Ambrosi
