= Eusebio da San Giorgio =

Italian painter (c. 1470 – c. 1550)

- Born: 1470; Perugia, Italy
- Died: 1550 (aged 79–80)
- Known for: Art
- Movement: Renaissance

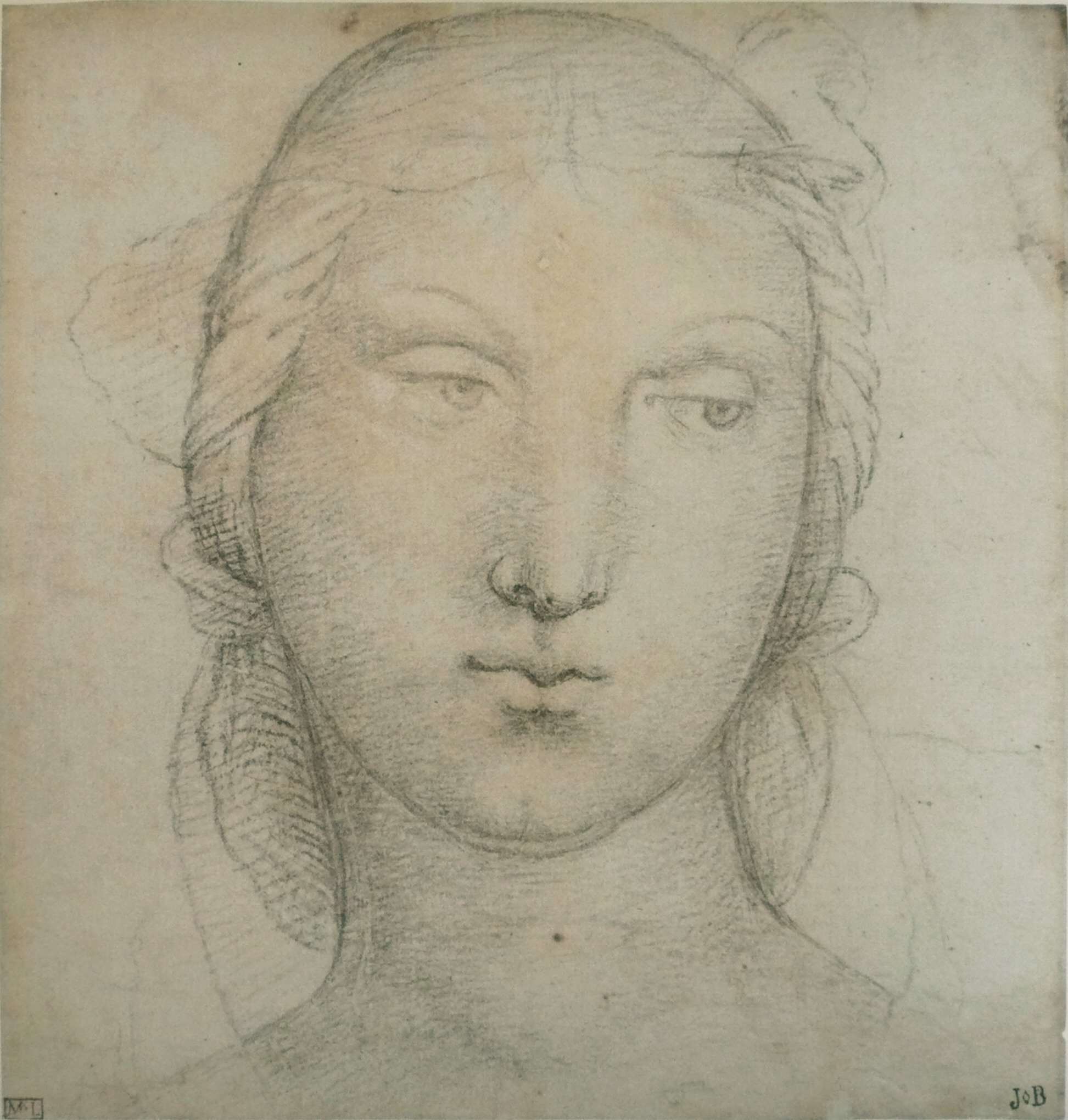
Head of a young woman, attributed to Eusebio da San Giorgio - Louvre, département des Arts Graphiques

Eusebio da San Giorgio or Eusebio di Jacopo di Cristoforo da San Giorgio (c. 1470 – c. 1550) was an Italian painter of the Renaissance period.

== Biography ==
Born in Perugia, he was a pupil of the painter Pietro Perugino. In 1494, he was elected as Camerlengo dell'Arte dei pittori.

He painted an altarpiece for the parish church of Matelica (1512). He painted an Adoration of the Kings in the church of Sant’Agostino in Perugia. He painted frescoes of an Annunciation and a St Francis receiving the stigmata (1507) for the cloister of San Damiano at Assisi. In 1537, records note that along with Sinibaldo Ibi, he praised a work by Giovanni Battista Caporali completed for the main altar of the Duomo of Perugia.
