= Santa Maria Maddalena, Matelica =

Roman Catholic church and monastery in Marche, Italy

Coordinates: 43°15′12.6″N 13°00′27.9″E

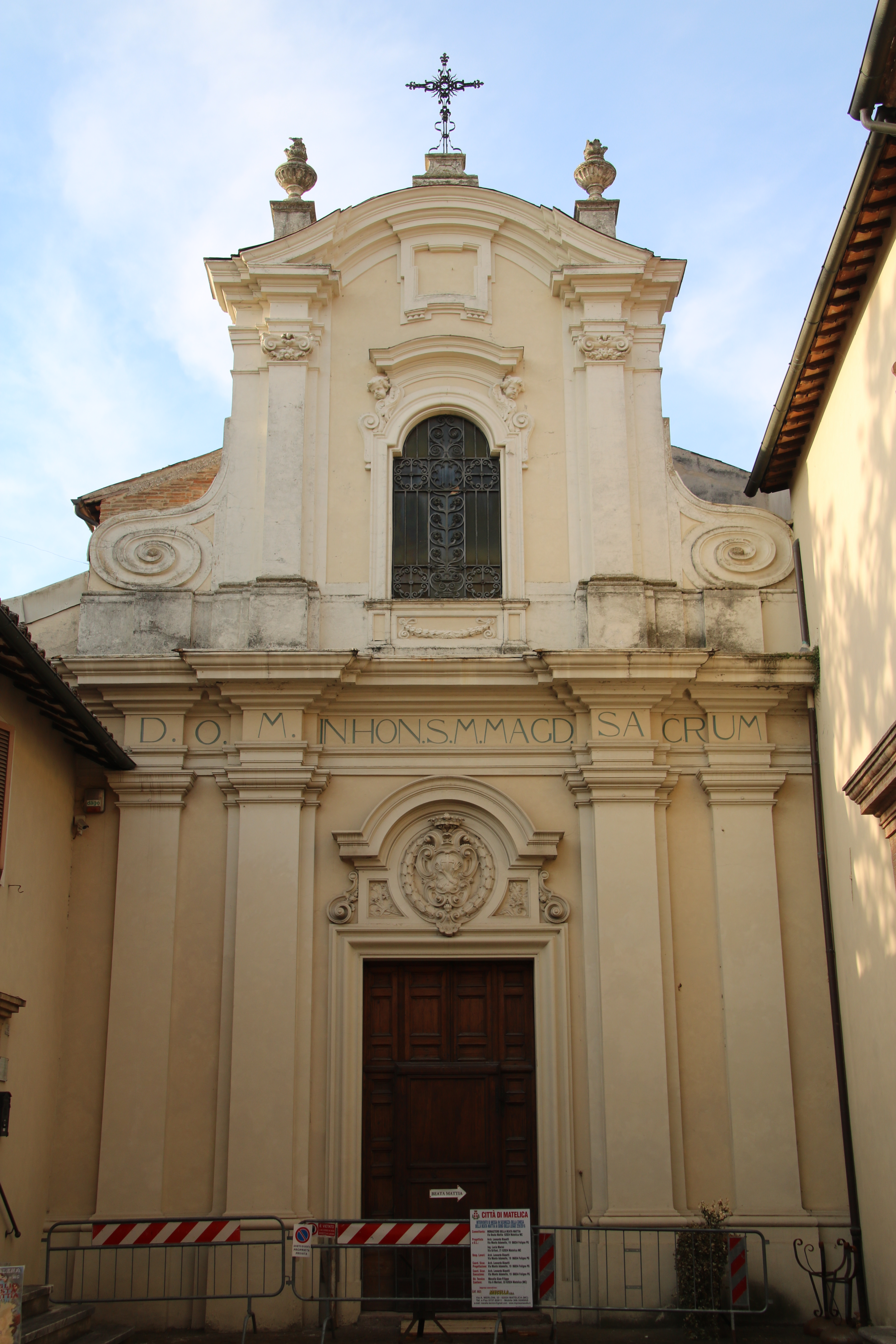

Santa Maria Maddalena, also called the Chiesa della Beata Mattia is a Baroque-style, Roman Catholic church and monastery located on a cul de sac of Via Beata Mattia #39, where it intersects with Via Damiano Chiesa, in Matelica, province of Macerata, region of Marche, Italy.

== History ==
The church is among the oldest in Matelica and construction began in 1225, when a group of Clarissine nuns, including Sister Mattia, established a convent. In 1765, the Sister was beatified, and the church is known for Blessed Mattia. The church has a tall campanile, which served as an overlook for the southern approach to the city. An earthquake in 1740 caused major damage, and in 1750, the church underwent a major reconstruction, including the formulation of a baroque façade, work commissioned by Enrico Mattei and using designs of Gaetano Maggi and Domenico Luigi Valeri.

The interiors were built still maintaining a screened separation of the cloistered nuns from the lay public. The columns are colored in scagliola. The main altar houses the incorrupt body of the Blessed Mattia in a glass case.

In the monastery, which extends to the right of the facades are housed some of the works of art from the site including a 13th-century painted Crucifix with Madonna and John the Baptist. The church contains a Madonna and Child painted by 13th-century Masters, including Maestro della Culla.
