= Sant'Agostino, Matelica =

Roman Catholic church in Italy

Coordinates: 43°15′19.2″N 13°00′27.4″E

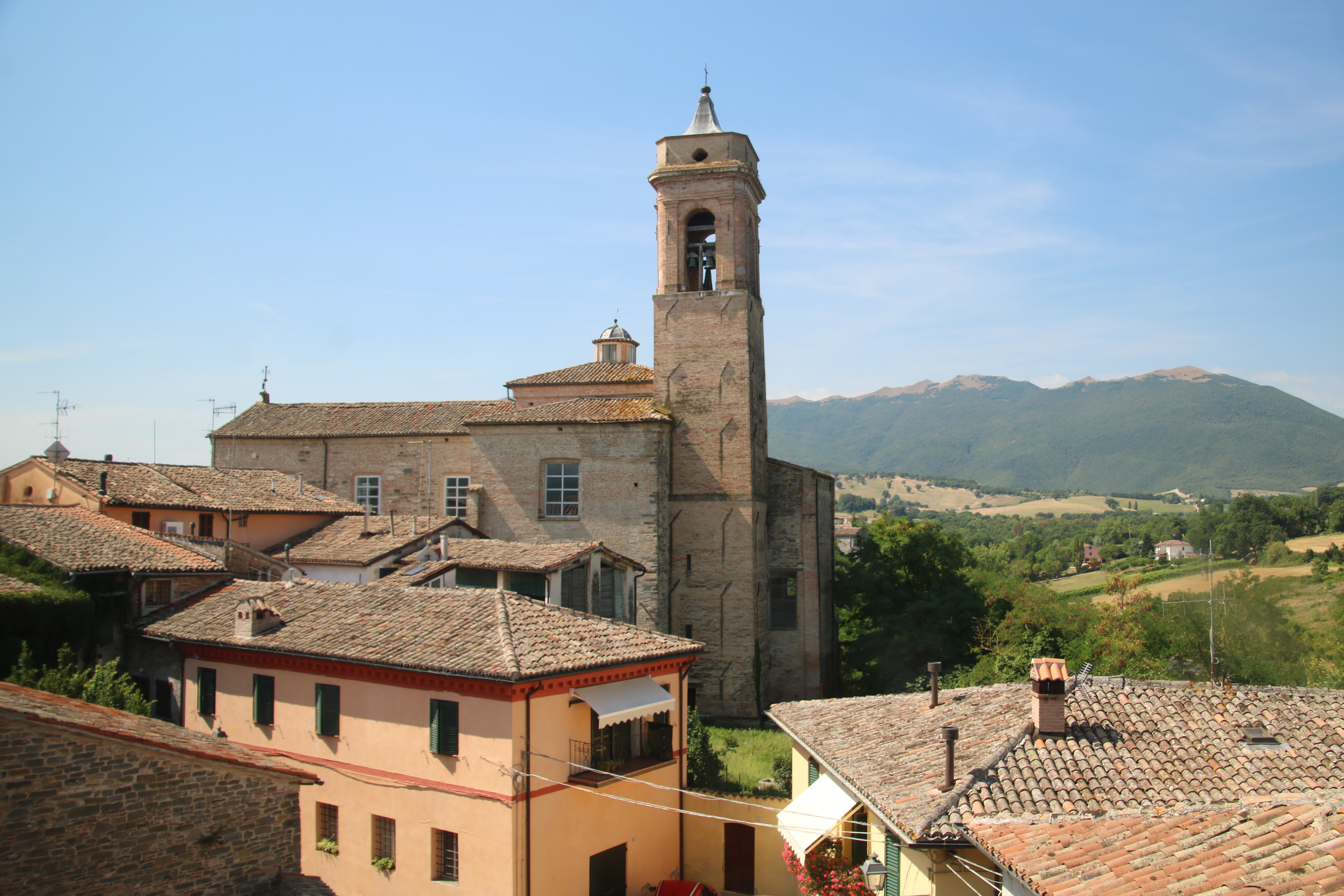

Sant'Agostino is a Baroque style, Roman Catholic church located on Via Umberto I #29, facing Piazza Lorenzo Valerio, in Matelica, Province of Macerata, region of Marche, Italy.

== History ==
The church of Sant'Agostino was built in the 13th century on the steep hillside on the outskirts of the medieval town. The Romanesque-style rounded arch stone entrance portal, decorated with floral and vegetative motifs, is the only part of the original church that remains. The portal now perilously leans toward the street. The remainder of the church was rebuilt in the 18th century with a dome, and interiors decorated with stucco in baroque style. The church contains three late 16th-century works attributed to Ercole Ramazzani: Noli me Tangere; St Nicola di Tolentino intercedes for Souls in Purgatory; and a Madonna, Child and Saints. A painting depicting the St Francis in Extasis receives the stigmata is attributed to the studio of Guercino.
