= San Francesco, Matelica =

Roman Catholic church and monastery in Matelica, Macerata, Marche, Italy

Coordinates: 43°15′26.3″N 13°00′39.5″E

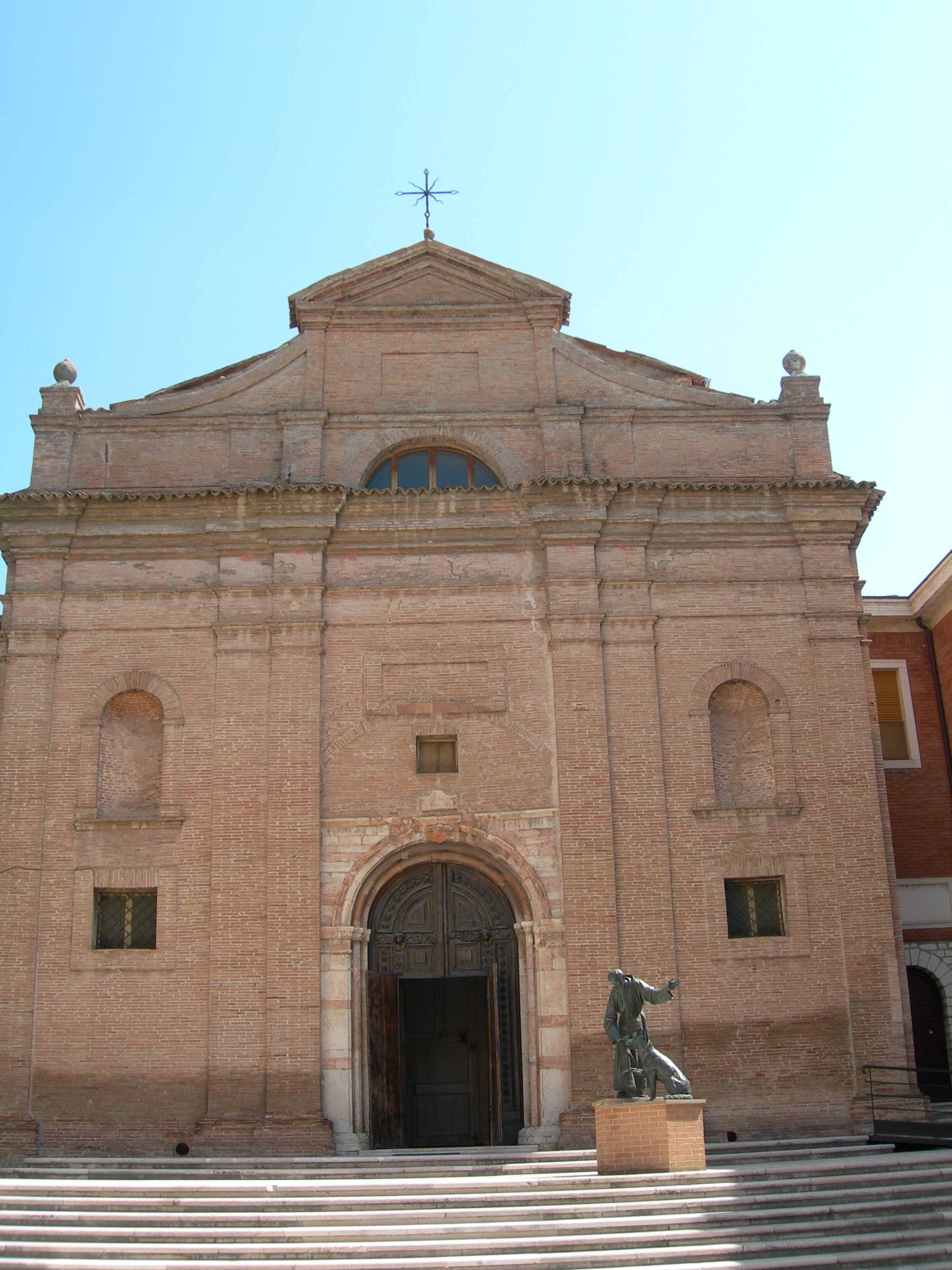

San Francesco is a Gothic-style, Roman Catholic church and monastery located in Matelica, province of Macerata, region of Marche, Italy.

== History ==
A church and convent were originally erected in the middle of the 13th-century; of this church, the Romanesque-style portal remains. A reconstruction occurred between 1653 and 1719, and created the church's sober brick facade with monumental pilasters. By the 19th century, the monastery was in disuse. The stairs in front of the church and the ground-level bronze statue of St Francis of Assisi feeding the wolf date to the 1970s. The church was damaged by the 1997 earthquake and remained closed in 2014.

Among the works recently housed in the church are:

- Souls of the Purgatory liberated by Saints Pietro Diacono, Gregory the Great, and Francis of Assisi with the Blessed Battista Camilla da Varano (1587) by Ercole Ramazzani in first chapel on the right.
- Enthroned Madonna and Child between St Francis and Catherine of Alexandria and other Saints in a large predella (1501) by Marco Palmezzano in 2nd chapel on the right
- Assumption of the Madonna (1574) by Ercole Ramazzani in the 5th chapel
- Enthroned Madonna and Saints (1512) by Eusebio da San Giorgio in the 5th chapel
- Virgin and Child and Saints (mid 15th-century) by Francesco di Gentile in 4th chapel
- Enthroned Madonna and Child (1501) by Marco Palmezzano in 2nd chapel
- Adoration of the Magi (1566) by Gianfrancesco and Simone de Magistris of Caldarola in the 4th chapel
- Martyrdom of St Stephen(1569) by Gianfrancesco and Simone de Magistris in the 6th Chapel
- Crucifixion fresco in Chapel of the Passion and cloisters (1569) attributed to Simone de Magistris.
- 14th-century frescoes in choir, painted by followers of Giotto
