= Matelica Cathedral =

Roman Catholic cathedral in Matelica, Marche, Italy

Coordinates: 43.2576°N 13.0087°E

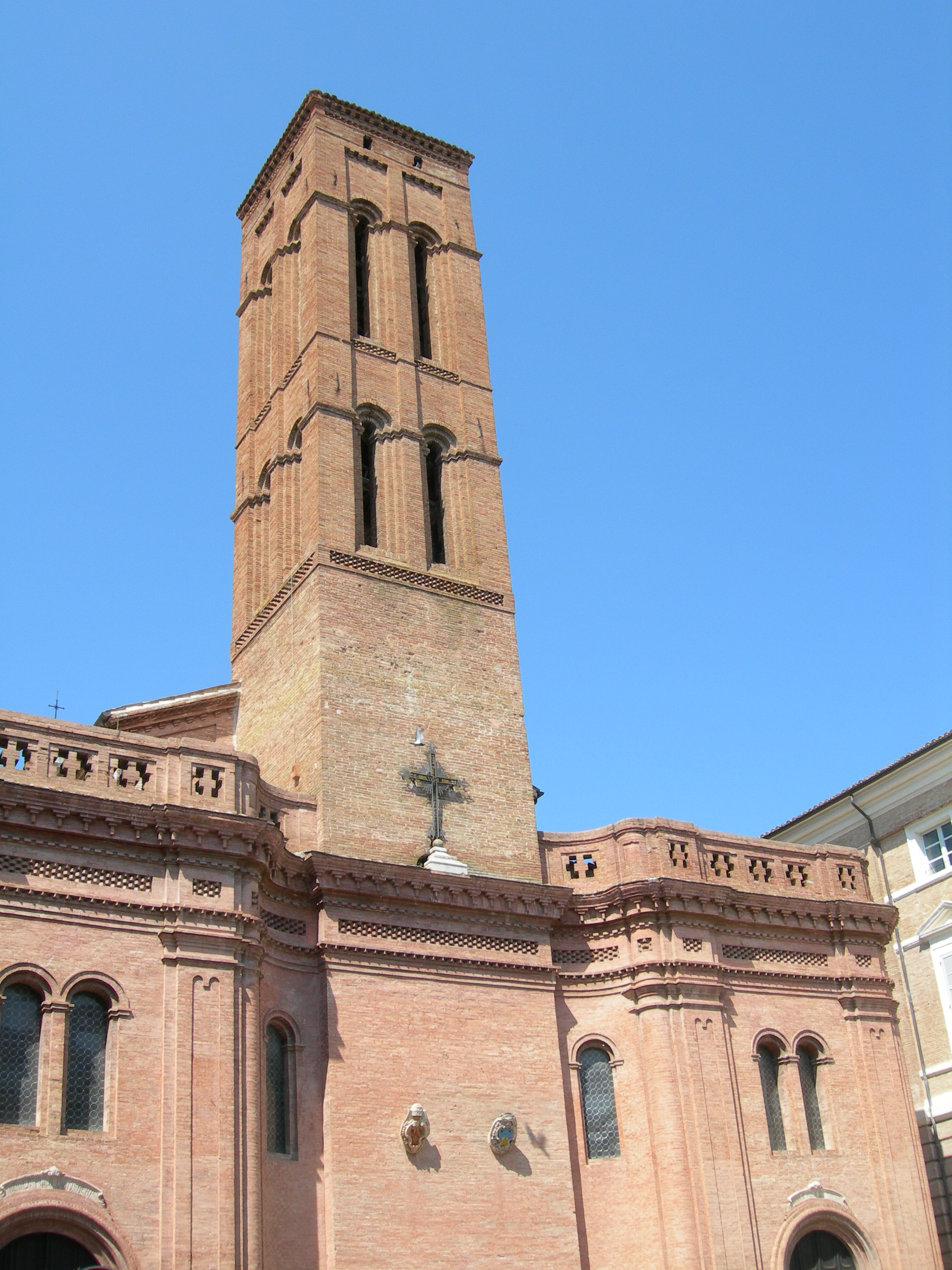
West front of the cathedral, showing the unusually-placed campanile

Matelica Cathedral (Italian: Concattedrale or Chiesa di Santa Maria Assunta) is a Roman Catholic cathedral in Matelica, Marche, Italy, dedicated to the Assumption of the Virgin Mary. Formerly the episcopal seat of the Diocese of Matelica, it is now a co-cathedral in the Diocese of Fabriano-Matelica.

== History and description ==
The first cathedral of Matelica was built in the historical centre of the town, but fell into ruin after the bishop's seat was moved elsewhere, and was finally demolished in 1530.

It had already been replaced as the town's main church in the 15th century by the church of Santa Maria della Piazza, which was made the cathedral under the name of Santa Maria Assunta in 1785 when Matelica was restored as a bishopric.

The campanile, which dates from the 15th century, is most unusually positioned in the centre of the cathedral's west front. This has sometimes led to suppositions over whether the present church building occupies the same position as the original church or whether repeated re-buildings and restorations over time have had the effect of moving it.

Among the works of art in the cathedral, of particular note for the fine quality of the workmanship is an 18th-century crucifix in wood and silver by Giovanni Giardini of Forlì.
