= Chiesa del Suffragio, Matelica =

Church and monastery in Marche, Italy

Coordinates: 43°15′23.2″N 13°00′31.8″E

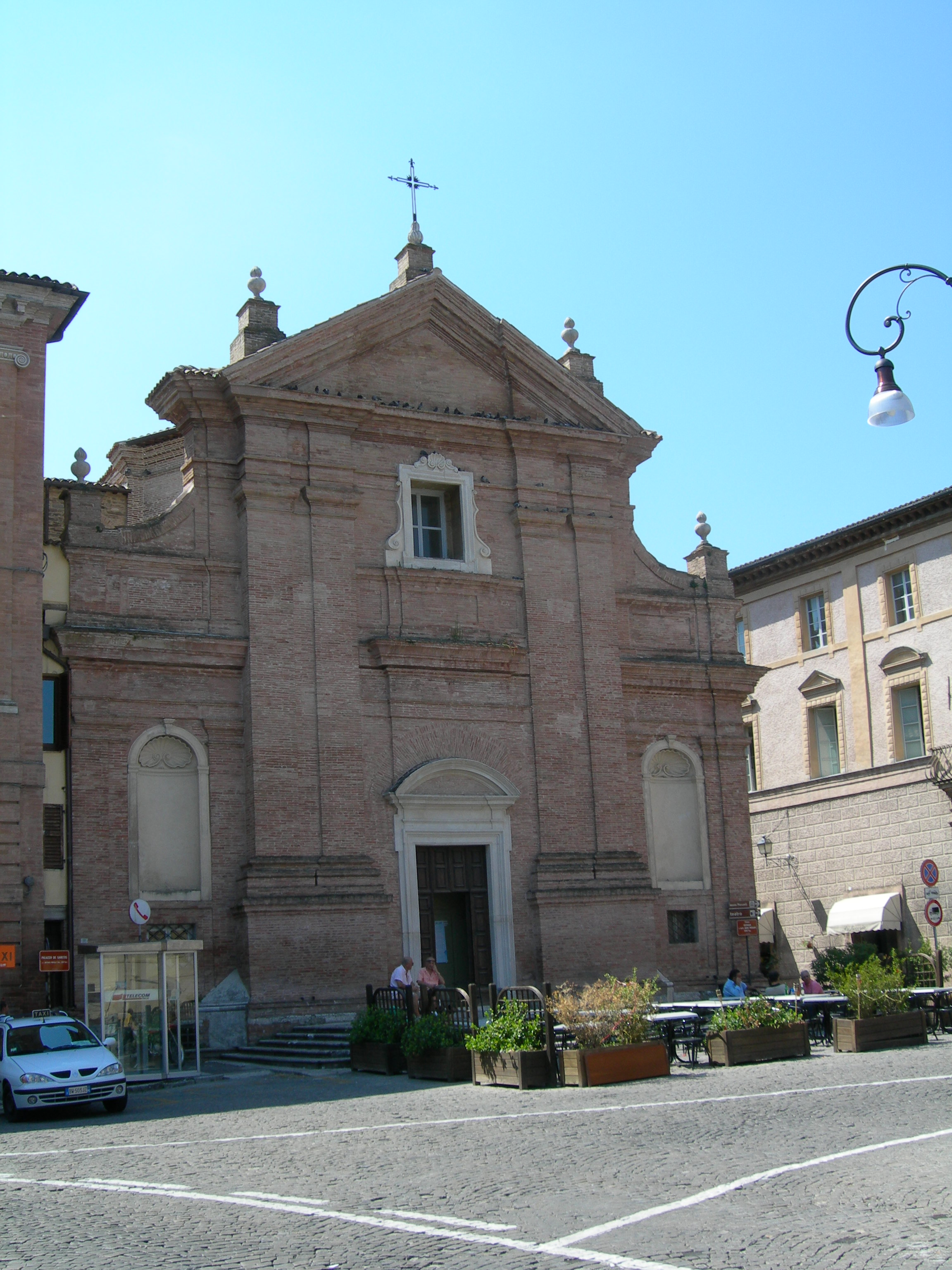
Chiesa del Suffragio, Matelica

The Chiesa del Suffragio, also known as the Chiese delle Anime Purganti (Church of the Suffering or Church of the Souls in Purgatory), is a Baroque-style, Roman Catholic church and monastery located in Piazza Mattei in the city center of Matelica, province of Macerata, region of Marche, Italy.

== History ==
The church was commissioned by the Confraternity Del Suffragio, which was founded in 1684. Work on the church was completed in 1715.

The brick facade has monumental pilasters upholding a triangular tympanum, flanking a white stone portal with a rounded pediment. In the presbytery are two chapels dedicated to Saints Sebastian and Lucy. An elliptical dome covers the nave, with a cupula frescoed with Jesus in Glory with Angels. The main altarpiece depicts Christ and the Souls in Purgatory by the studio of Biagio Puccini, which also painted the works in the lateral chapels.
