= Matelica =

- Comune
- Comune di Matelica
- Piazza Enrico Mattei

- Coat of arms

- Location within Italy Location within Marche
- Coordinates: 43°15′23.71″N 13°0′34.54″E
- Country: Italy
- Region: Marche
- Province: Macerata (MC)
- Frazioni: Balzani, Braccano, Castiglione, Cavalieri, Colferraio, Collepere, Colli, Grimaldi, Mistriano, Pezze, Piane, Poggeto, San Nicola, Terricoli, Valbona, Vinano

Government
  - Mayor: Massimo Baldini (Matelica Futura)

Area
  - Total: 81.1 km^{2} (31.3 sq mi)
- Elevation: 354 m (1,161 ft)

Population (31 December 2021)
  - Total: 9,384
  - Density: 116/km^{2} (300/sq mi)
- Demonym: Matelicesi
- Time zone: UTC+1 (CET)
  - Summer (DST): UTC+2 (CEST)
- Postal code: 62024
- Dialing code: 0737
- Patron saint: St. Adrian
- Saint day: 16 September
- Website: Official website

Matelica is a comune (municipality) of the Province of Macerata in the Italian region of Marche. Located about 60 kilometres (37 mi) southwest of Ancona and 35 kilometres (22 mi) west of Macerata, it extends over an area of 81.04 square kilometres (31.29 mi^{2}).

== Geography ==
Matelica lies in an ample valley where the Braccano creek joins the Esino river, dominated by the town from an eastern ravine. The valley, roughly in the north–south direction, is delimited on the east and west sides by Apennines sub-ranges, whose highest peaks are respectively Mount Gemmo at 719 metres (2,359 ft) and Mount San Vicino at 1,479 metres (4,852 ft), compared to the 354 metres (1,161 ft) above sea-level of the city centre.

Matelica borders on the following municipalities: Apiro, Castelraimondo, Cerreto d'Esi, Esanatoglia, Fabriano, Fiuminata, Gagliole, Poggio San Vicino, San Severino Marche.

== Climate ==
The climate is dictated by the Apennines and, to a lesser extent, by the temperate Adriatic Sea on the east. Consequently, Matelica enjoys a somewhat continental climate with cool winters and hot, dry summers. In winter, Matelica occasionally experiences sub-zero temperatures and snowfall between December and February. Highest summer temperatures can be well above 30 °C (86 °F) in July and August. In keeping with the layout of the valley, the dominant winds are along the north–south direction, those from the south being more frequent but weaker than those from the north.

== History ==
The first human settlements in the area can be traced to the Umbri and Picentes and date back to the 1st millennium BC. Later, under Roman rule, Matelica became a municipium (70 BC). Starting from the 5th century AD, it was seat of a bishop, who for a while remained the only authority, after the fall of the Western Roman Empire. The town was then annexed to the Byzantine Empire (552). Destroyed by the Lombards in 578, it was subsequently joined to the bishopric of Camerino. From the 9th century, Matelica was under the indirect rule of the Holy Roman Empire (while belonging formally to the Papal States), then becoming a free municipality in 1160. In 1174, it was again obliterated, this time by the army of Christian I (Archbishop of Mainz). Since then, Matelica remained part of the Papal States (albeit at times under an independent Governor), until the Italian unification (1861), save for the brief Napoleonic occupation.

== Main sights ==
The old part of town presents an urban structure dating largely from the Middle Ages, and is punctuated by several palazzi and churches from different periods.

Sights in the town include:

- Matelica Cathedral
- Church of Sant'Agostino (14th century)
- Church of San Francesco (1246–1260, façade from the 18th century)
- Church of Santa Maria Maddalena
- Chiesa del Suffragio
- San Filippo, Matelica (17th century)
- Communal palace
- Governor Palace and Civic Tower
- Piersanti Museum, housing a collection of artworks.
- Palazzo Pettinelli

== Twin towns ==
- Las Rosas, Argentina
