= San Facondino, Gualdo Tadino =

Building in Gualdo Tadino, Italy

Coordinates: 43.250070°N 12.771075°E

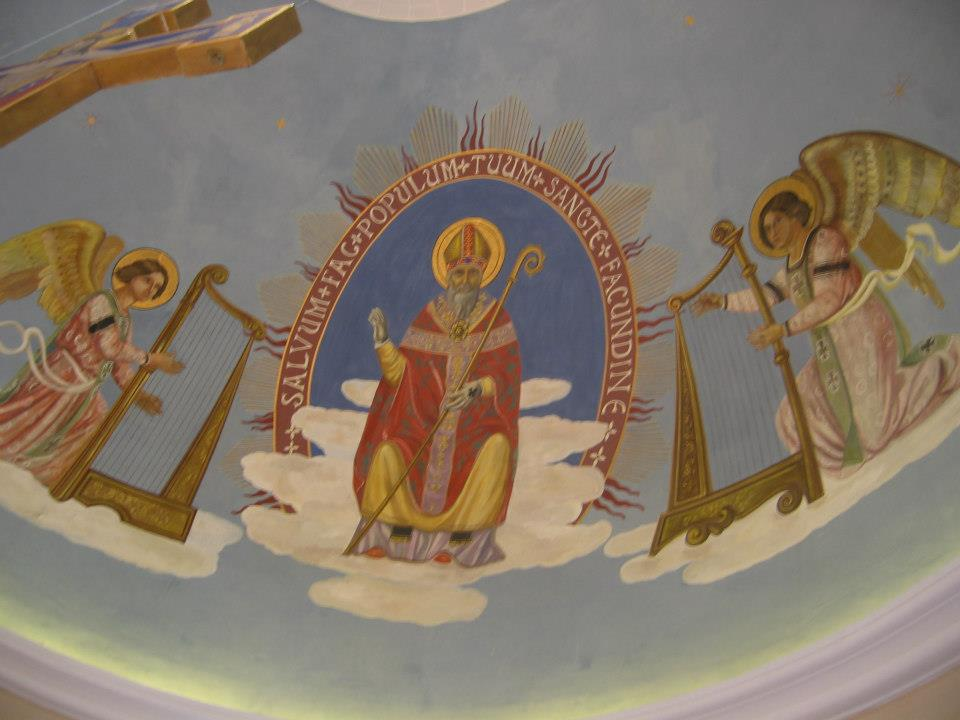

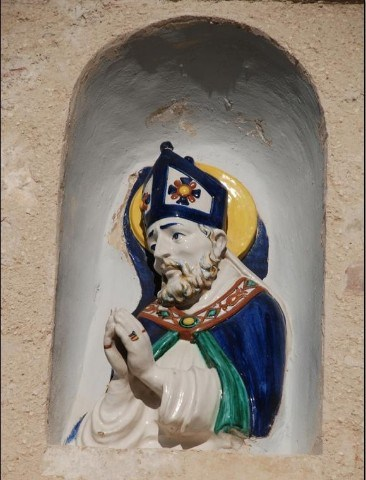

San Facondino is an originally Romanesque-style, Roman Catholic church located on the via of the same name just north outside of the urban center of Gualdo Tadino, region of Umbria, Italy. The church has undergone numerous modifications over the centuries.

The church is dedicated to the 7th-century bishop Facondino (died 607). According to legend, soon after the bishop's death, and angelic messenger calling for the body of the bishop to be taken in oxen cart for burial, and to let the oxen decide where to go. The church built at the site suffered recurrent devastation over the next few centuries, until a church of the present layout was built between the 11th and 13th centuries. Part of the commission was by the Holy Roman Emperor Henry II. The base of the bell-tower, likely built utilizing spolia from prior structures dates to prior to the year 1000 AD.

The interior has three naves. The walls were originally all covered with frescoes from the past but now traces remain, depicting saints Roch and Antony of Padua painted by Matteo da Gualdo; a St Anne and Madonna and Child by Bernardo da Gualdo; and a 17th-century fresco of the Baptism of Christ. The remainder of the present frescoes were painted in 1932 by Pico Discepoli (1887-1962).

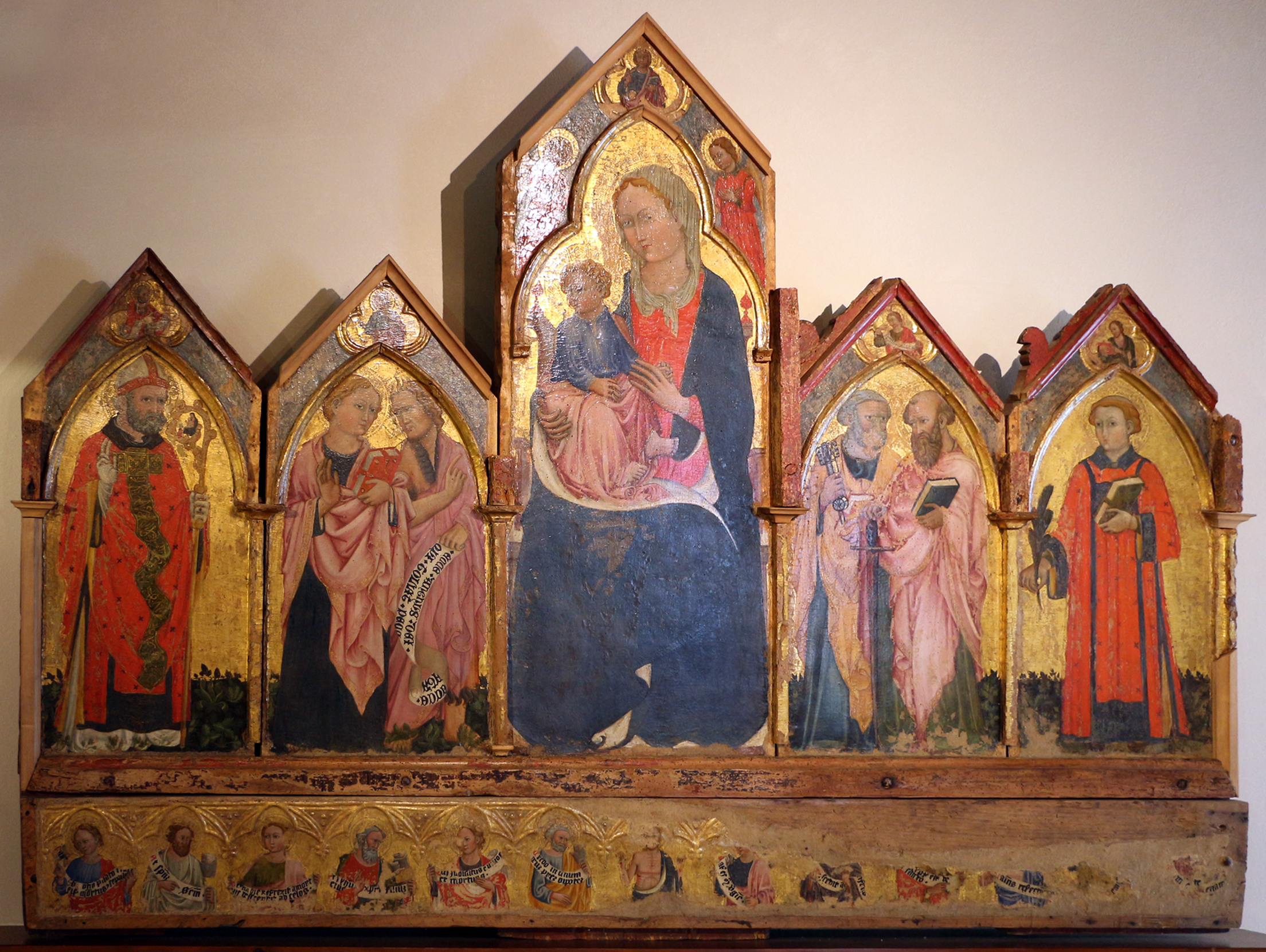
Polyptych, now in Museo Civico

Of the altarpieces now on display are a St Facondino in prayer by Giuseppe Reposati. The former main altarpiece was a 15th-century polyptych depicting an Enthroned Madonna and Child, surrounded by angels, saints and apostles by the Master of Fossato, now on display in the Pinacoteca Civica of Rocca Flea. A codex depicting the life of San Facondino attributed to the same master is now in the Vatican Library.
