= San Francesco, Gualdo Tadino =

Church building in Gualdo Tadino, Italy

Coordinates: 43.231088°N 12.784278°E

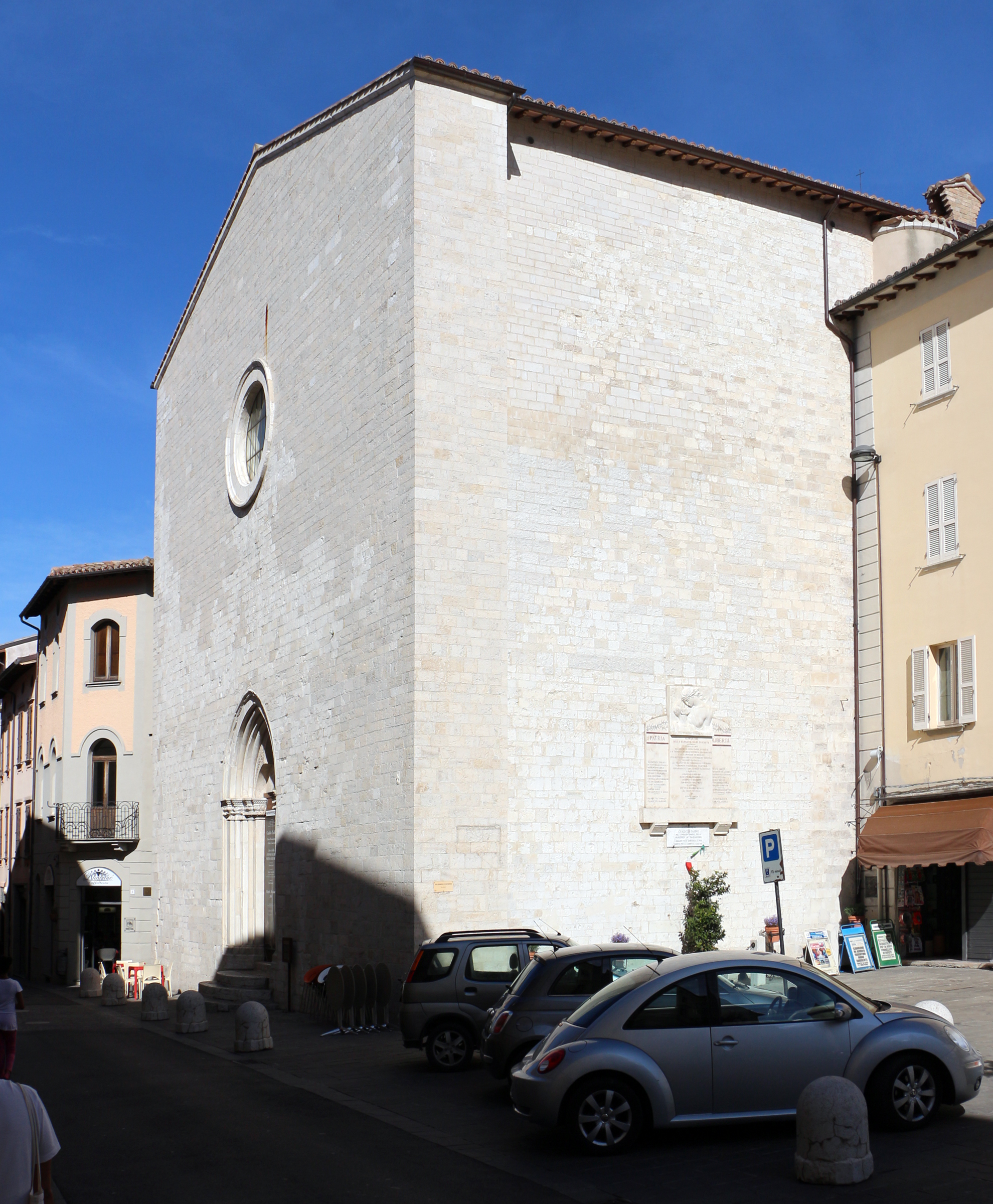
Gualdo tadino, san francesco

San Francesco is a Gothic-style, Roman Catholic church located in Piazza Martiri della Libertà of Gualdo Tadino, region of Umbria, Italy. It is located opposite to the Cathedral of Gualdo Tadino.

Construction of the church by the Franciscan order began in 1241 and was completed in 1315. The church has frescoes by Matteo da Gualdo and work by the Master of San Verecondo.
