= Piergentile da Matelica =

Italian painter

Piergentile da Matelica (active first half 16th century) was an Italian painter of the Renaissance period.

== Biography ==
He was born apparently in Matelica. Little is known of his biography. He was influenced or trained with Luca Signorelli. Some of his works were collaborations with Venanzio da Camerino, including altarpieces including the altarpiece of St Anne in San Menardo of Arcevia, or the fresco depicting the Assumption of the Virgin in the Sanctuary of Santa Maria delle Macchie in Gagliole, and others in the church of San Francesco in Nocera Umbra. They also collaborated on the Madonna and Child between Saints Peter and Paul in the Pinacoteca of Macerata.
