= Master of San Verecondo =

Italian painter

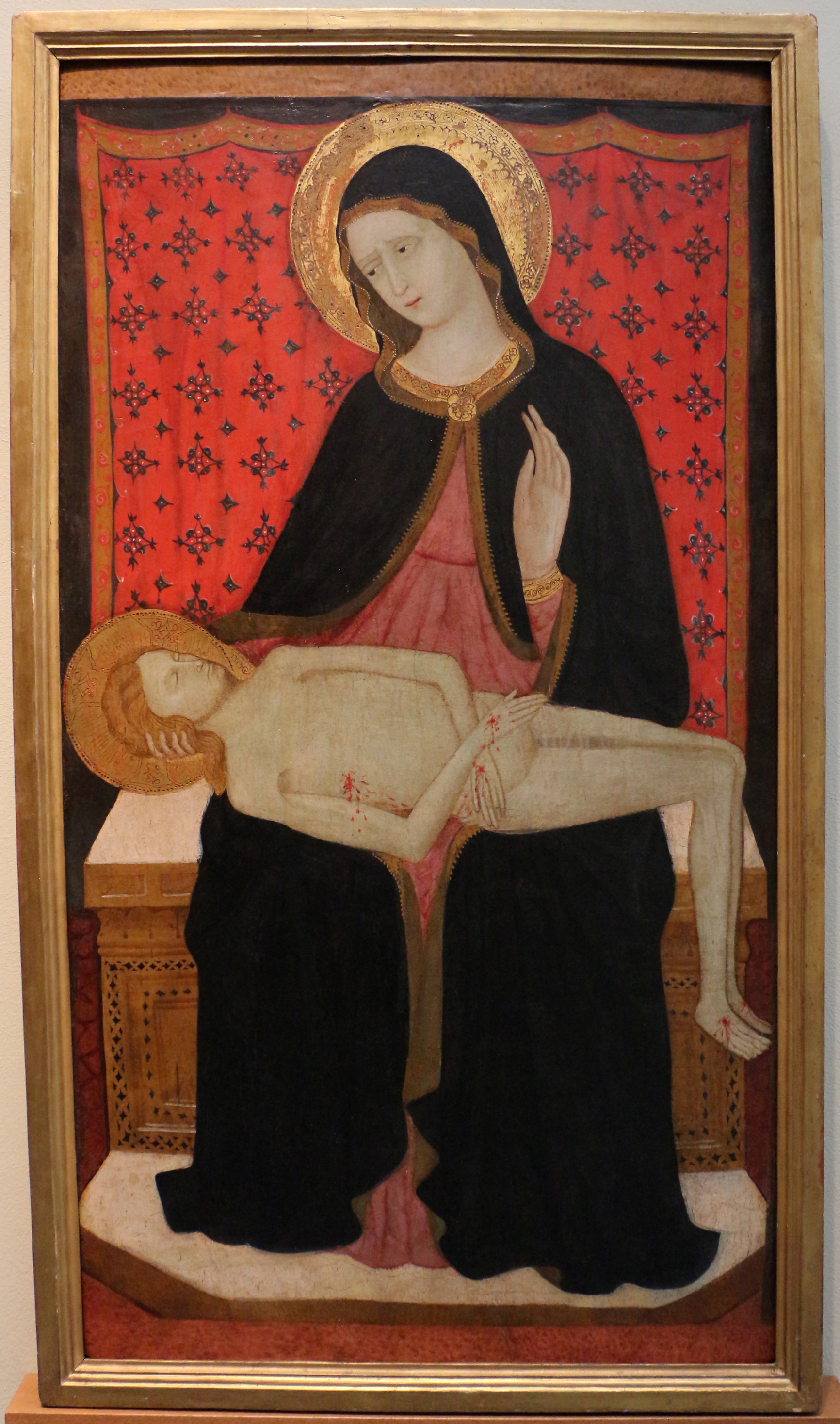
A Madonna with Dead Christ of c. 1415–30, in the Pinacoteca Nazionale di Bologna

The Master of San Verecondo (active first half of 15th century) was an anonymous painter active in the towns of Fabriano and Gualdo Tadino in the Marche.

He painted in the church of San Francesco in Gualdo Tadino and a fragment of a crucifixion for the Convent of San Domenico in Fabriano. Works of his are also on display in the Pinacoteca Vaticana of Rome and the Collezione Salini of Asciano. The Pinacoteca of Fabriano has a gilded triptych depicting a Madonna and Child with Saints Augustine and San Verecondo.
