= Giovanni Angelo d'Antonio =

Italian painter

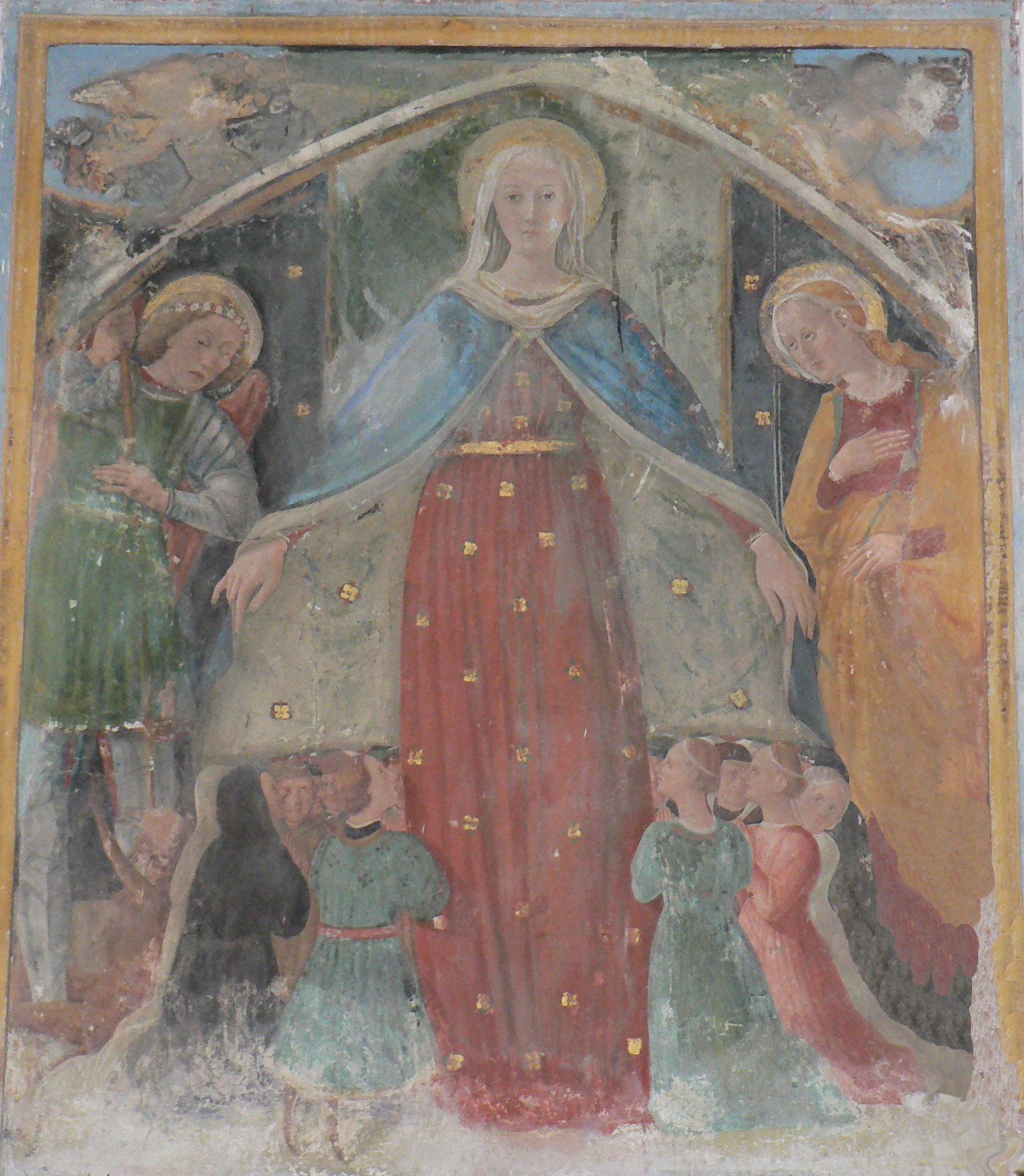
Madonna della Misericordia (1468) fresco by Giovanni Angelo d'Antonio, Chiesa di Santa Maria del Soccorso, Villa di Montalto, Italy

Giovanni Angelo d'Antonio (15th century) was an Italian Renaissance painter belonging to the Camerino school that also included Giovanni Boccati and Girolamo di Giovanni.

== Biography ==
D'Antonio was born in a peasant community in the mountain village of Bolognola between 1415 and 1420. His father was known as Antonio di Domenico "the madman". The first records of Giovanni Angelo d'Antonio date from 1443, after he had just made a trip to Florence that included a meeting with Giovanni di Cosimo de' Medici. After a second visit in 1444, he returned to Camerino to produce his first notable work, Madonna e santi (1445), now at Palazzo di Venezia in Rome. The picture, painted for the church of San Michele Arcangelo, Bolognola at which his brother, don Pietro, was the priest from 1441, shows the influence of the Florentine School and of Filippo Lippi in particular.

In 1449 he was commissioned to work on a fresco for a chapel in Sant'Agostino in Camerino.

It is hypothesised that he may have made a visit to Padua with his friend and fellow Camerino school painter Giovanni Boccati, which would explain the change in his style in the 1450s.

His most significant work is considered to be the Annunciation from the convent at Spermento, probably painted in 1456.

His most successful period followed, lasting into the 1460s, during which his work reveals an understanding of the way in which Piero della Francesca was using light. Works from this period include the Crocifissione e santi at Castello di Fiordimonte (1456), the Madonna e santi from the church of San Francesco in Camerino (1462), and the Madonna della Misericordia at Villa di Montalto near Cessapalombo (1468).

His final major piece was undertaken in the seventies. He returned to work in his small home town to fresco a Madonna and child with various saints in a roadside shrine at Bolognola. The shrine frescoes have now been removed to the Pinacoteca Civica in Camerino and restored.

Giovanni Angelo d'Antonio made his last Will and testament in 1478 and was dead by 1481.

Until a radical reassessment in 2001 much of his work had been attributed to Girolamo di Giovanni. The contribution made by Giovanni Angelo d'Antonio to the reputation of the Camerino school of the 15th century is now considered at least as significant as that made by Giovanni Boccati and Girolamo di Giovanni.
