= Girolamo di Giovanni di Camerino =

Italian painter

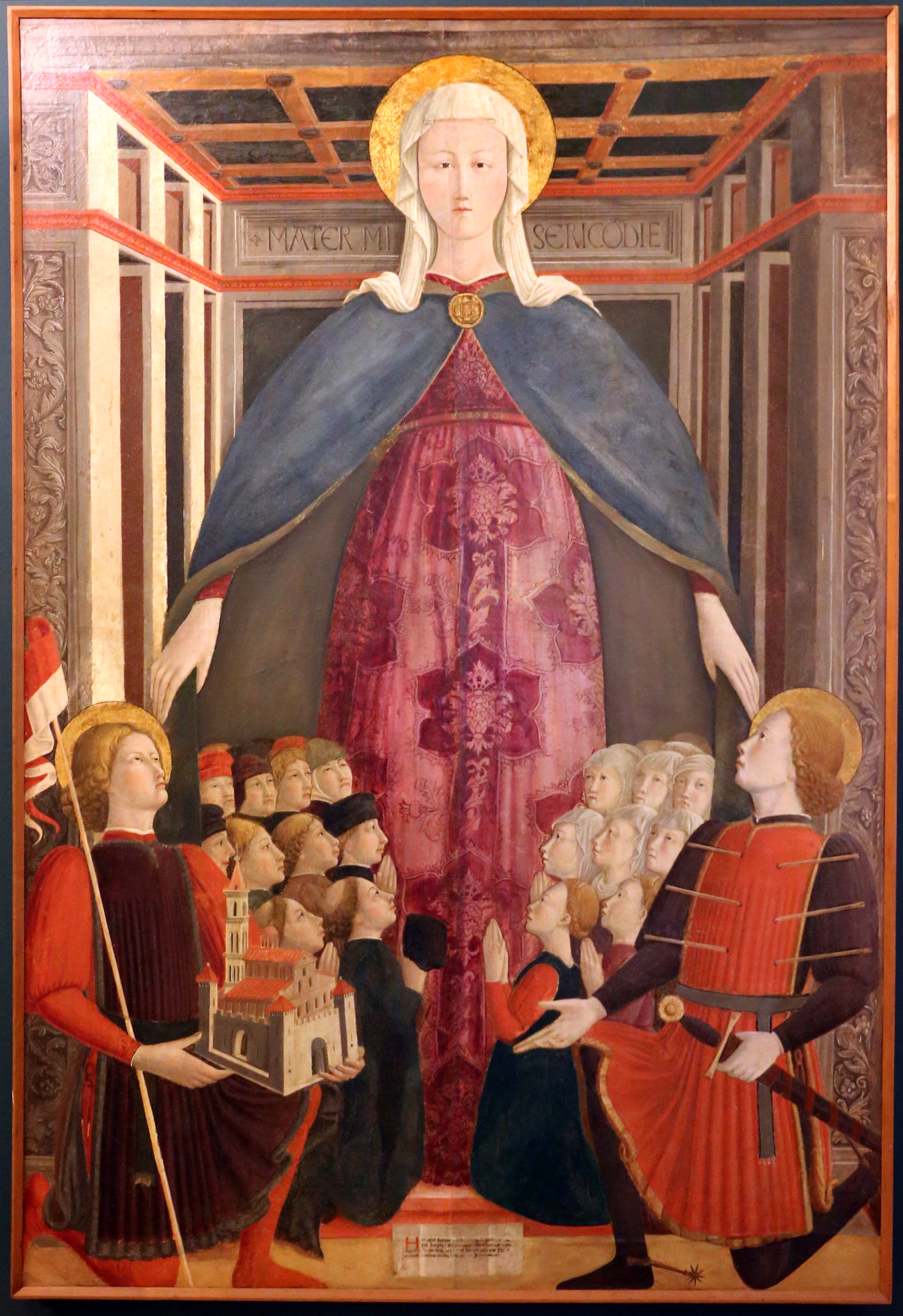

Girolamo di Giovanni di Camerino was an Italian painter. Supposedly the son of Giovanni Boccati, he was the painter of an altar-piece at Santa Maria del Pozzo in Monte San Martino, near Fermo, and represents the Madonna and Child, and four Angels, between SS. Thomas and Cyprian (1473).

== See also ==
- Da Varano
- Giovanni Boccati
- Giovanni Angelo d'Antonio
