= Matteo da Gualdo =

Italian painter

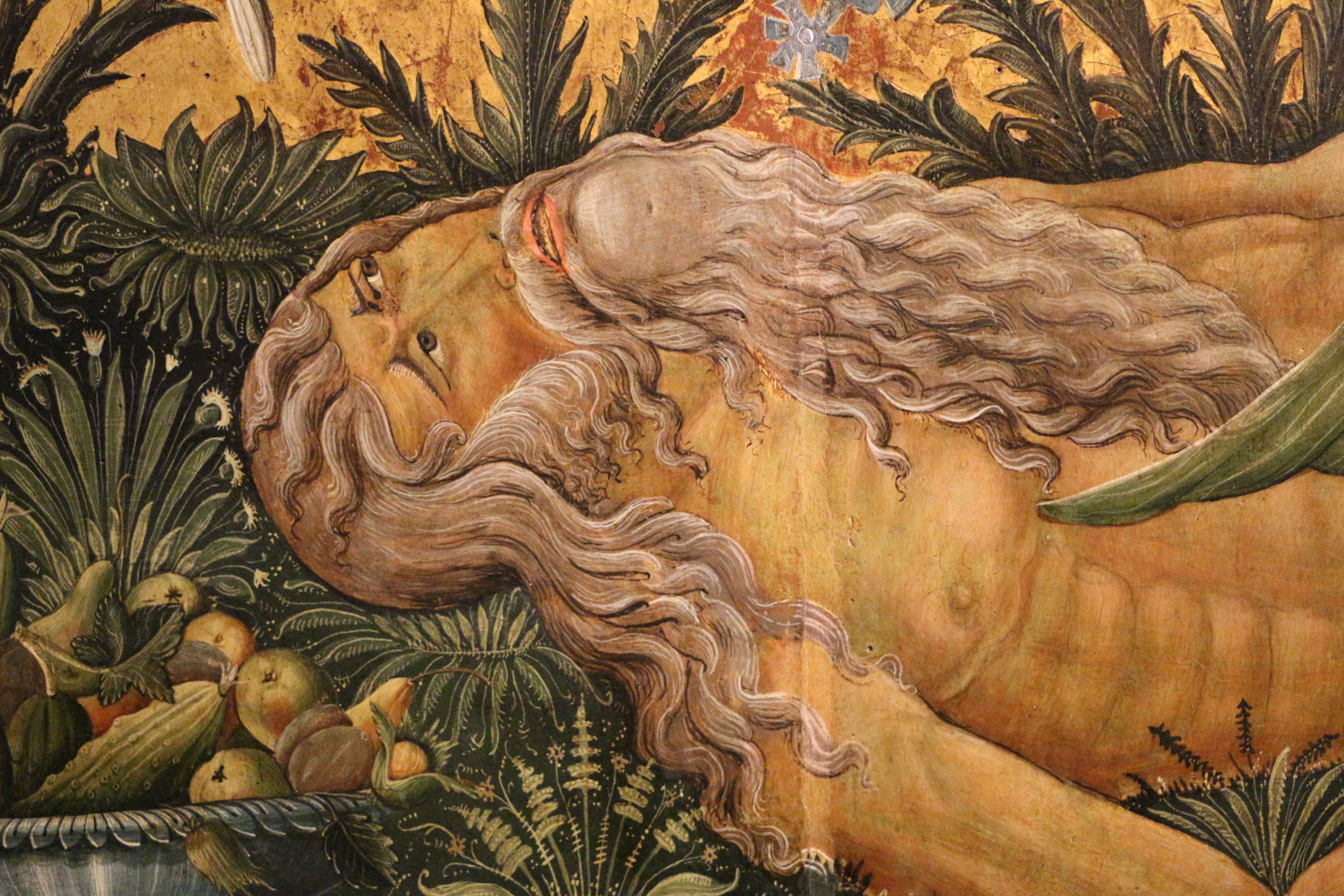
Detail of a Tree of Life in the Museo Civico di Gualdo Tadino

Matteo da Gualdo or Matteo di Pietro di Ser Bernardo (Gualdo Tadino, circa 1435-1440 - 1507) was an Italian painter, active in Gualdo Tadino, Nocera Umbra, and Assisi.

== Biography ==
He likely trained under the painter from Foligno, Bartolomeo di Tommaso, and Girolamo di Giovanni di Camerino. He was influenced by Piero della Francesca, Andrea Mantegna, and Niccolò di Liberatore. In 1462, he painted the polyptych of Santa Margherita; and in 1471, a triptych: both now in the Rocca Flea Museo Civico. He painted an Encounter of a young St John the Baptist with St Anne now found at the Pinacoteca of Nocera Umbra. His son Girolamo and grandson also became painters.

== Gallery ==
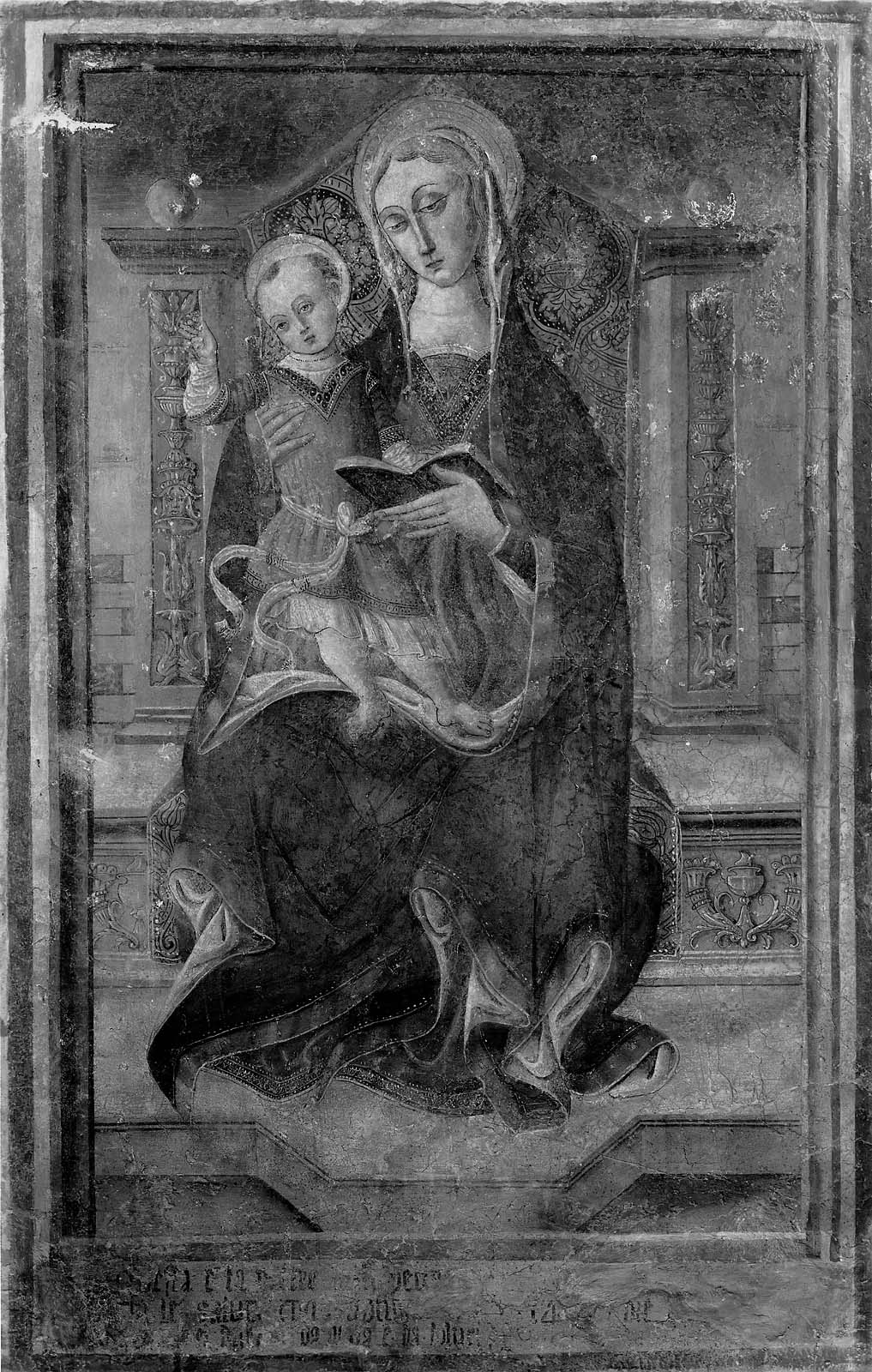
Virgin and Child Enthroned

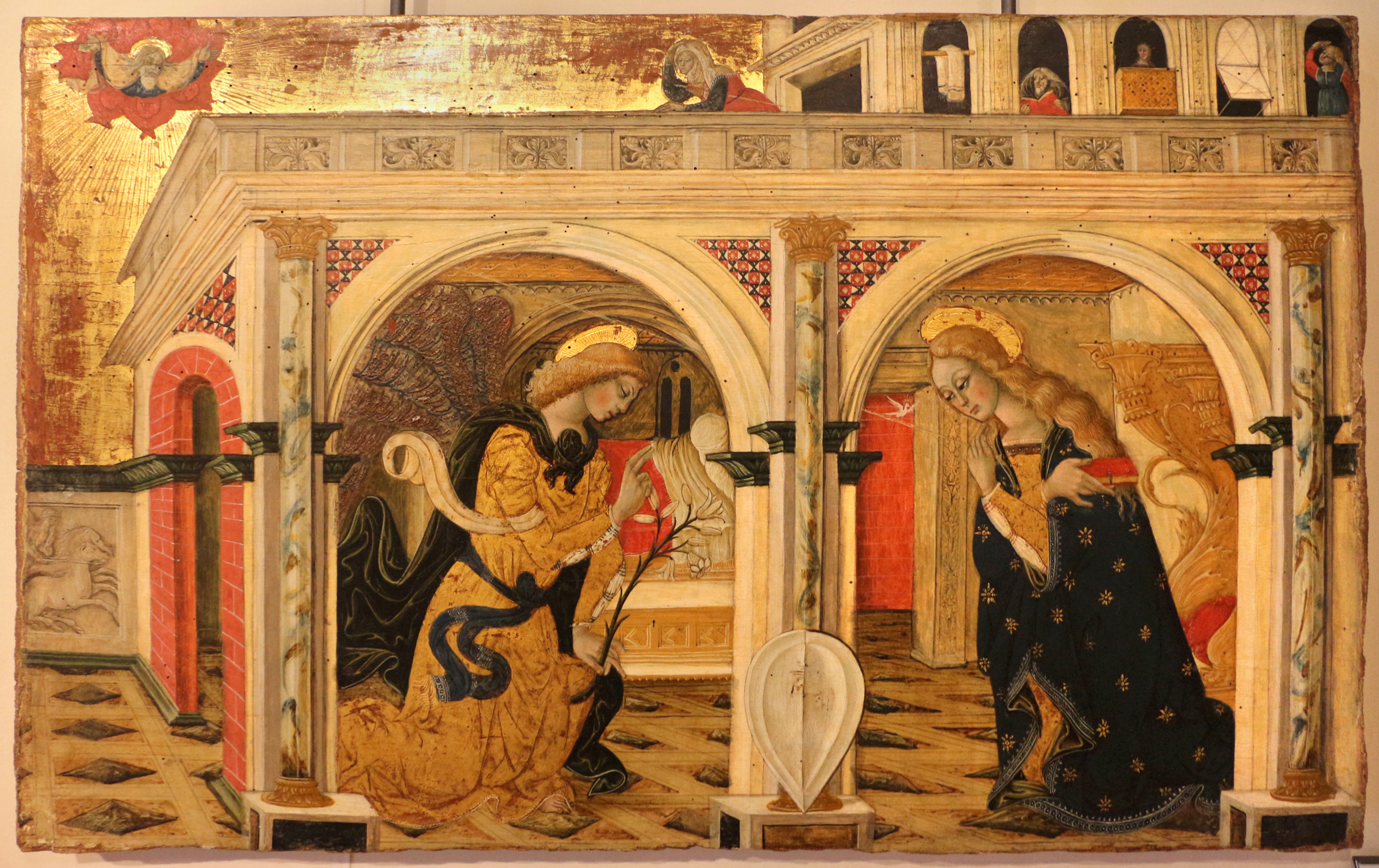
Annunciation

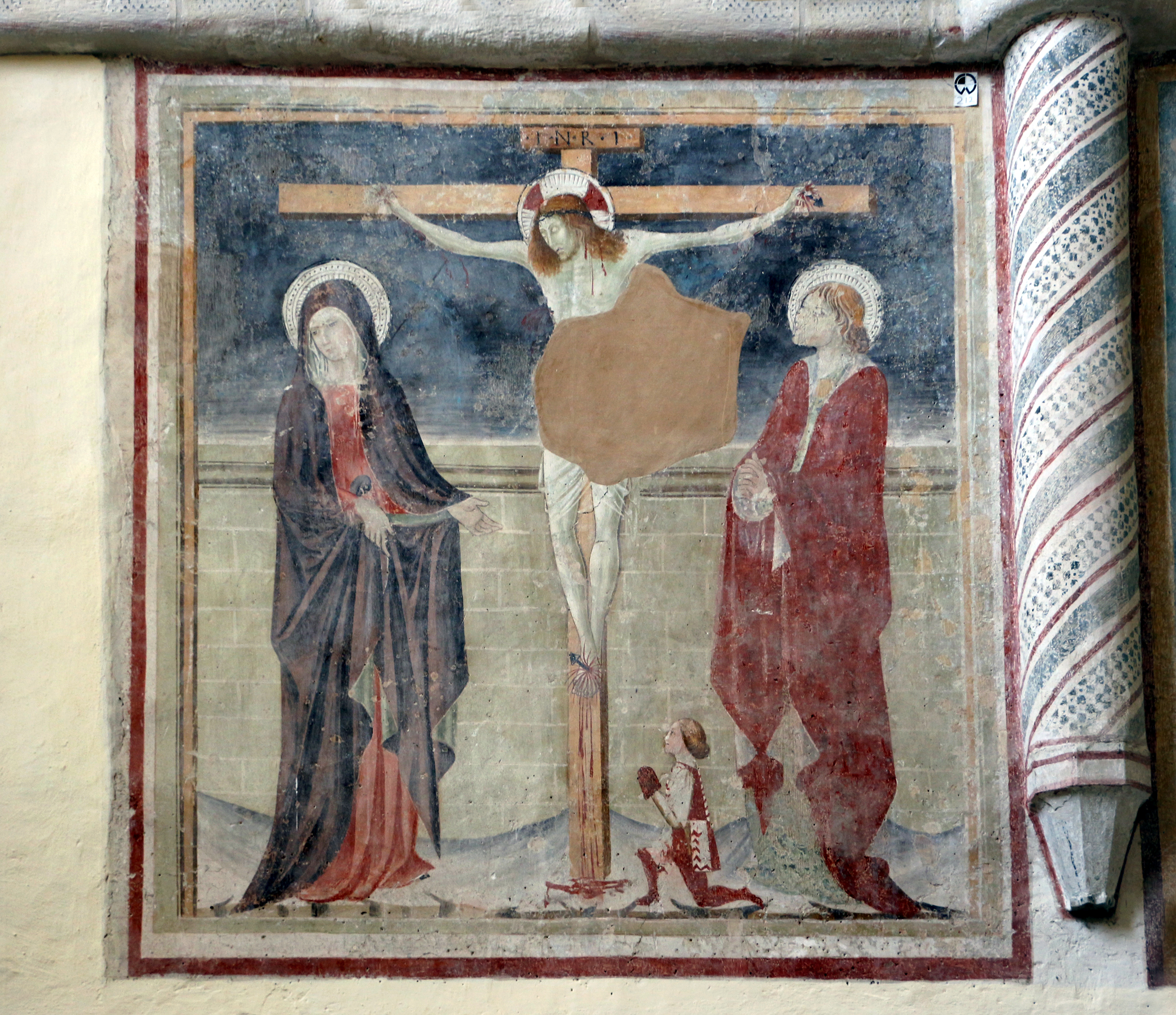
Crucifixion with the Mourners

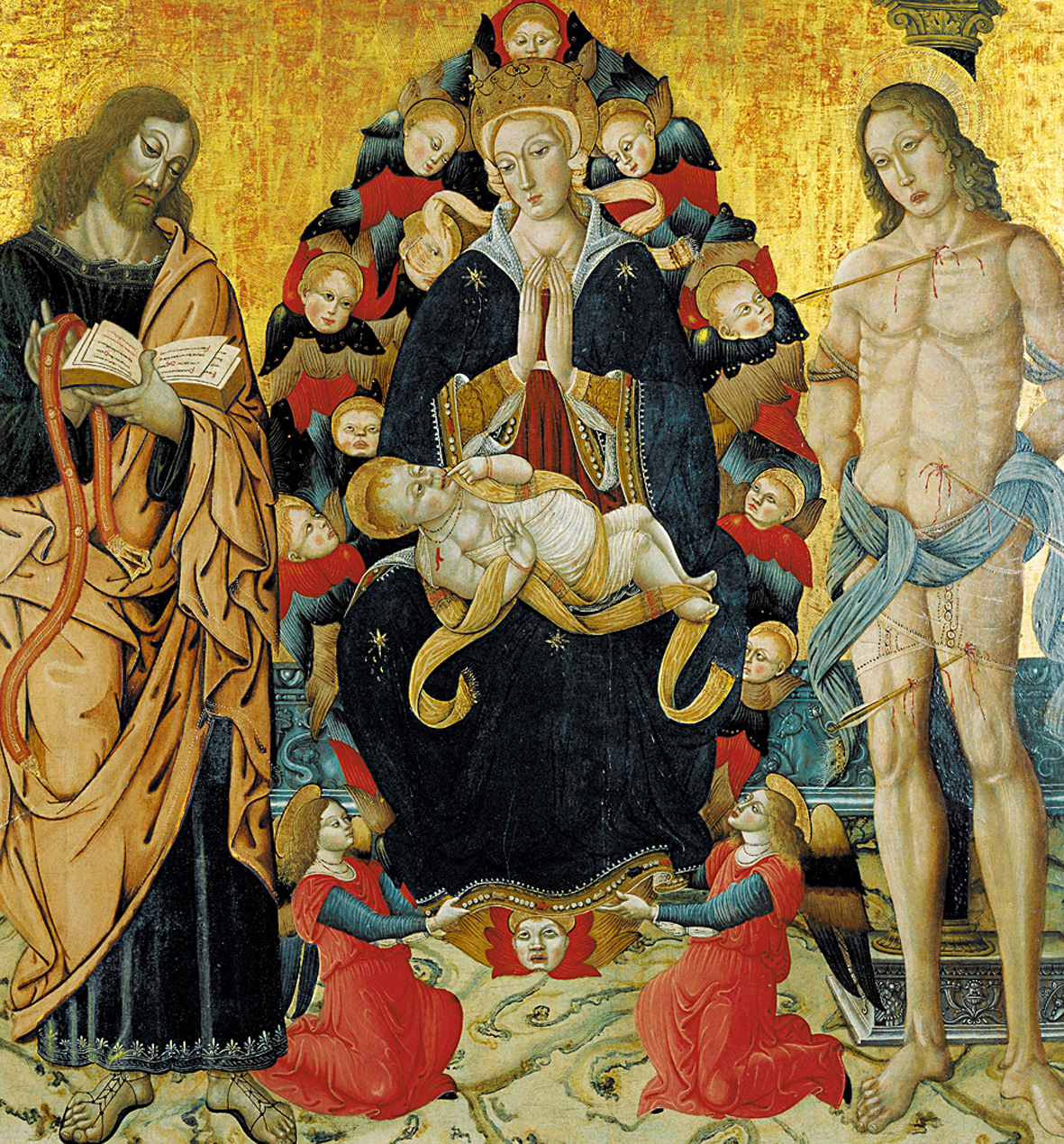
Assumption with Saints Thomas and Sebastian

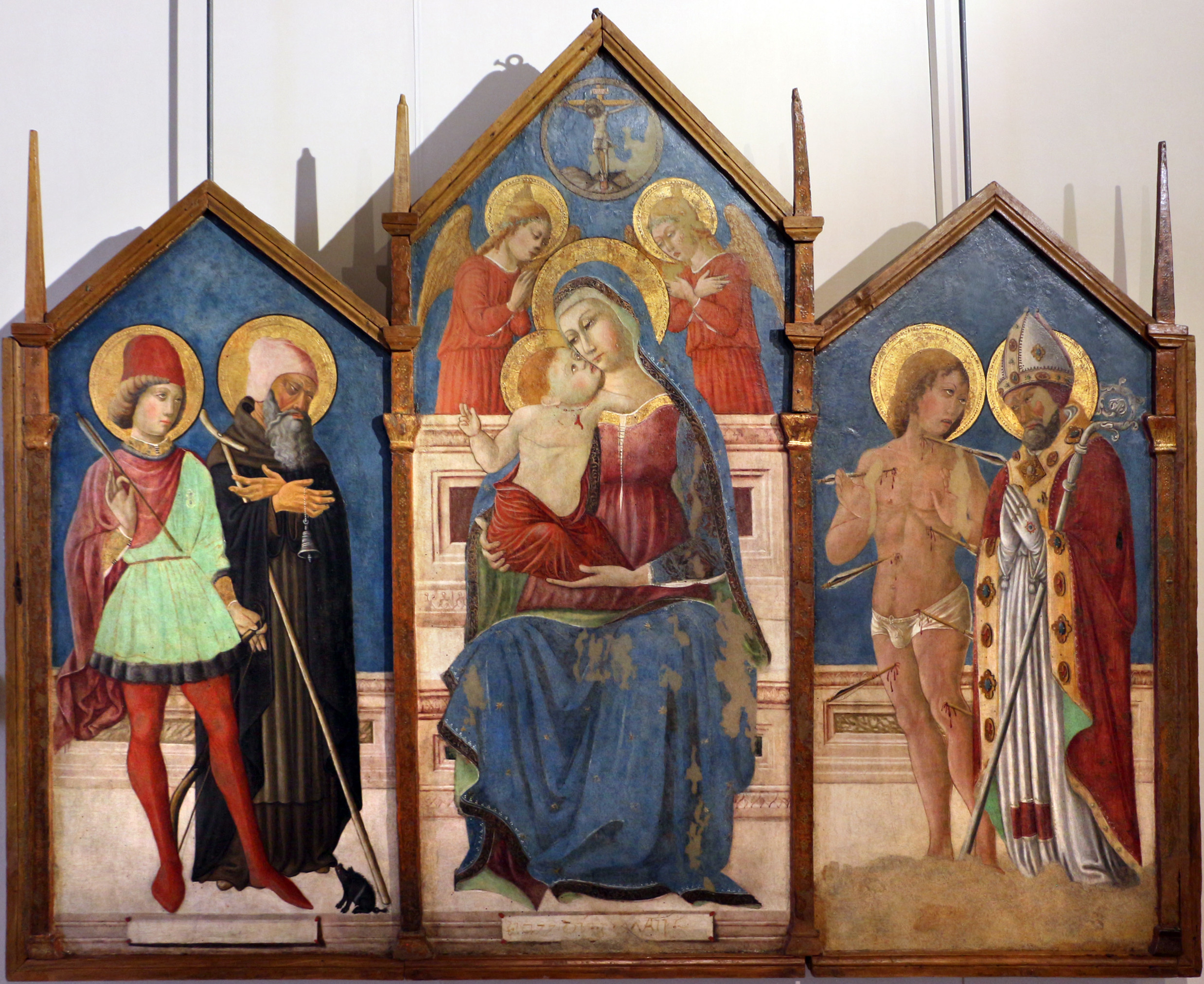
Trittico di Pastina di Gualdo

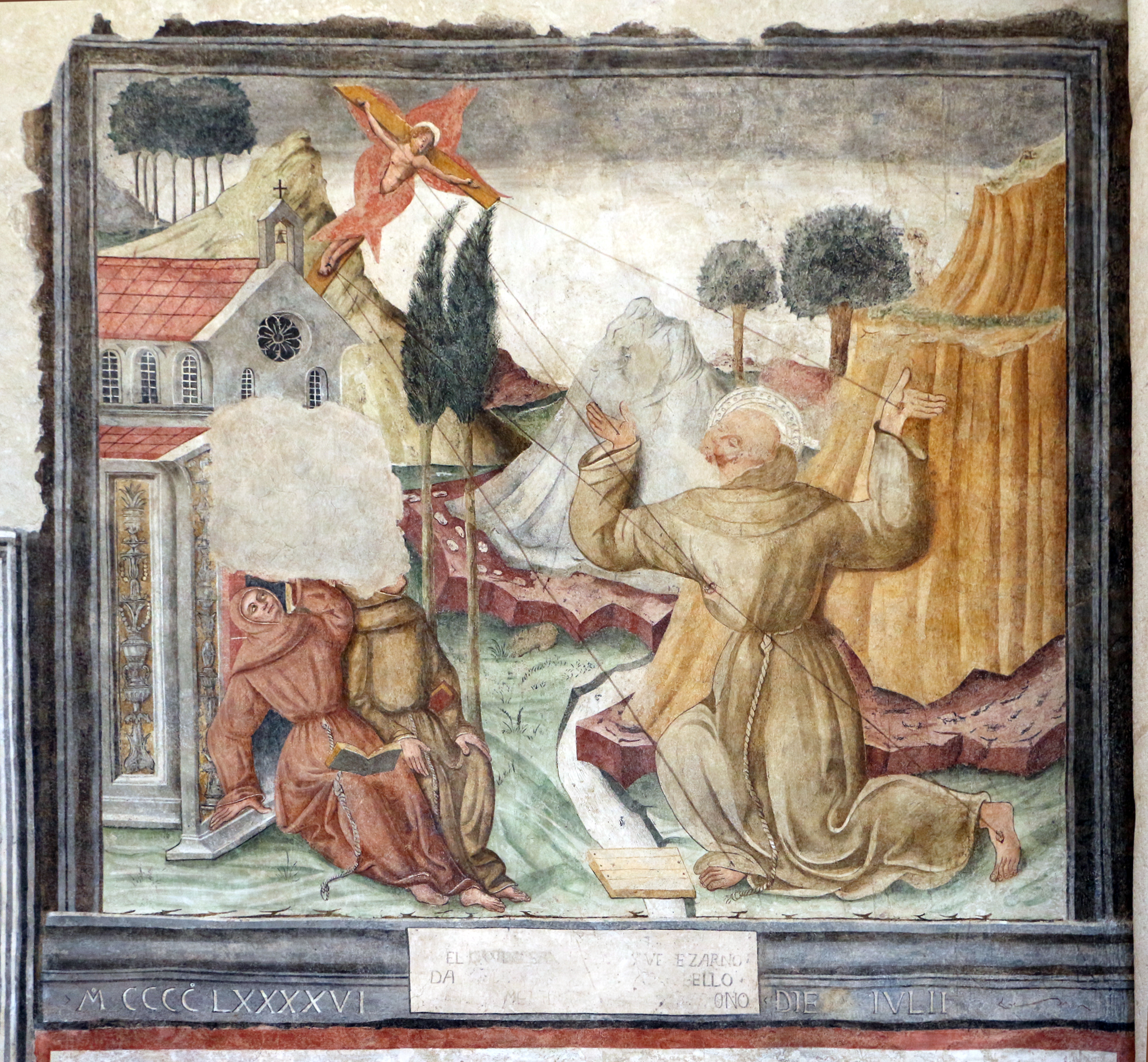
Stimmate di San Francesco
