= Master of Fossato =

Italian painter

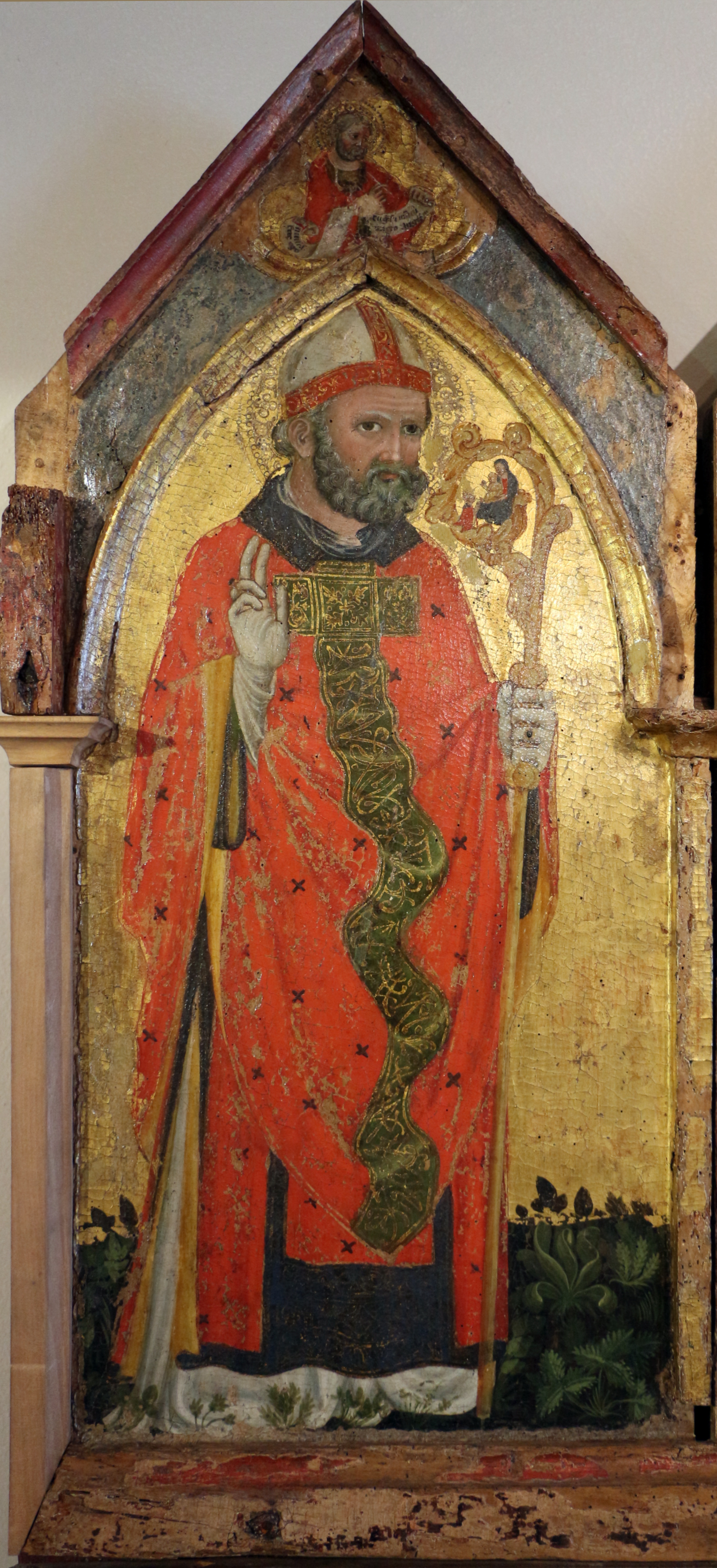
The work of the Master of Fossato

The Master of Fossato (active end of 14th and early 15th centuries) was an anonymous late Gothic style painter active in the towns of in the region of Umbria.

Attributed to this painter are paintings in the Oratory of Santa Maria della Piaggiola in Fossato di Vico, church of Santa Maria in Campis in Foligno, in the parish church of Grello, and a polyptych in the Pinacoteca of Gualdo Tadino. He painted a Crucifixion found in the Pinacoteca of Fabriano.
