= Pinacoteca Comunale, Nocera Umbra =

Coordinates: 43.11112°N 12.78981°E

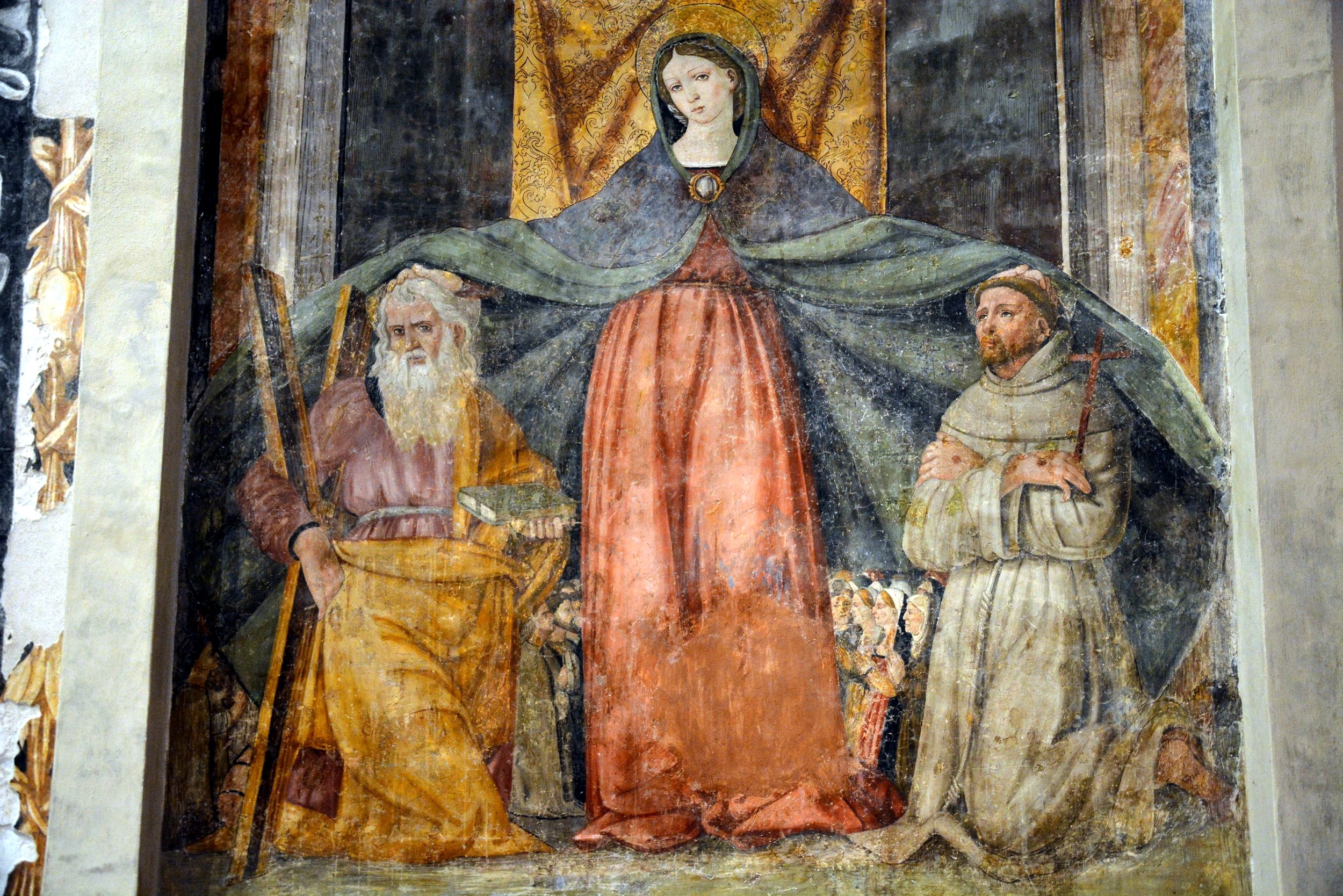
Fresco inside Pinacoteca Comunale

The Pinacoteca Comunale of the town of Nocera Umbra is located in the former church of San Francesco, located on Piazza Caprera #2 in this town in the region of Umbria, Italy.

== History and Description ==
The plain white marble facade of the church has two arched portals, a smaller left one and a larger right one with a gothic arch. Both lead into the flank of the single nave. The building has both Romanesque and Gothic stylistic elements and was erected in the 15th-century. The church was initially frescoed by Matteo Gualdo and other local painters. The church, once attached to a Franciscan convent, was suppressed by the Napoleonic government. By 1860s, the church and adjacent convent had fallen into disrepair and were expropriated by the commune.

In 1954, restoration of the church was begun, and the museum was inaugurated in 1957. The nucleus of the collection were works originating from suppressed religious buildings. In 1994, the architect Mario Manieri Elia, refurbished the layout. The earthquake of 1997 closed the museum and it was not reopened until 2003. The Franciscan convent and cloister were razed in the 19th-century.

The collection is notable for:

- Encounter of Gioacchino and St Anne and Francis receives stigmata by Matteo da Gualdo
- Polyptych by Niccolo di Liberatore
- Madonna della Misericodia by Venanzo da Camerino
- Madonna and child by Segna di Bonaventura
- Frescoes by Girolamo da Matteo
- Santa Barbara and vedute of Nocera by Bernardo di Girolamo da Guarda
