= Gagliole =

- Comune
- Comune di Gagliole
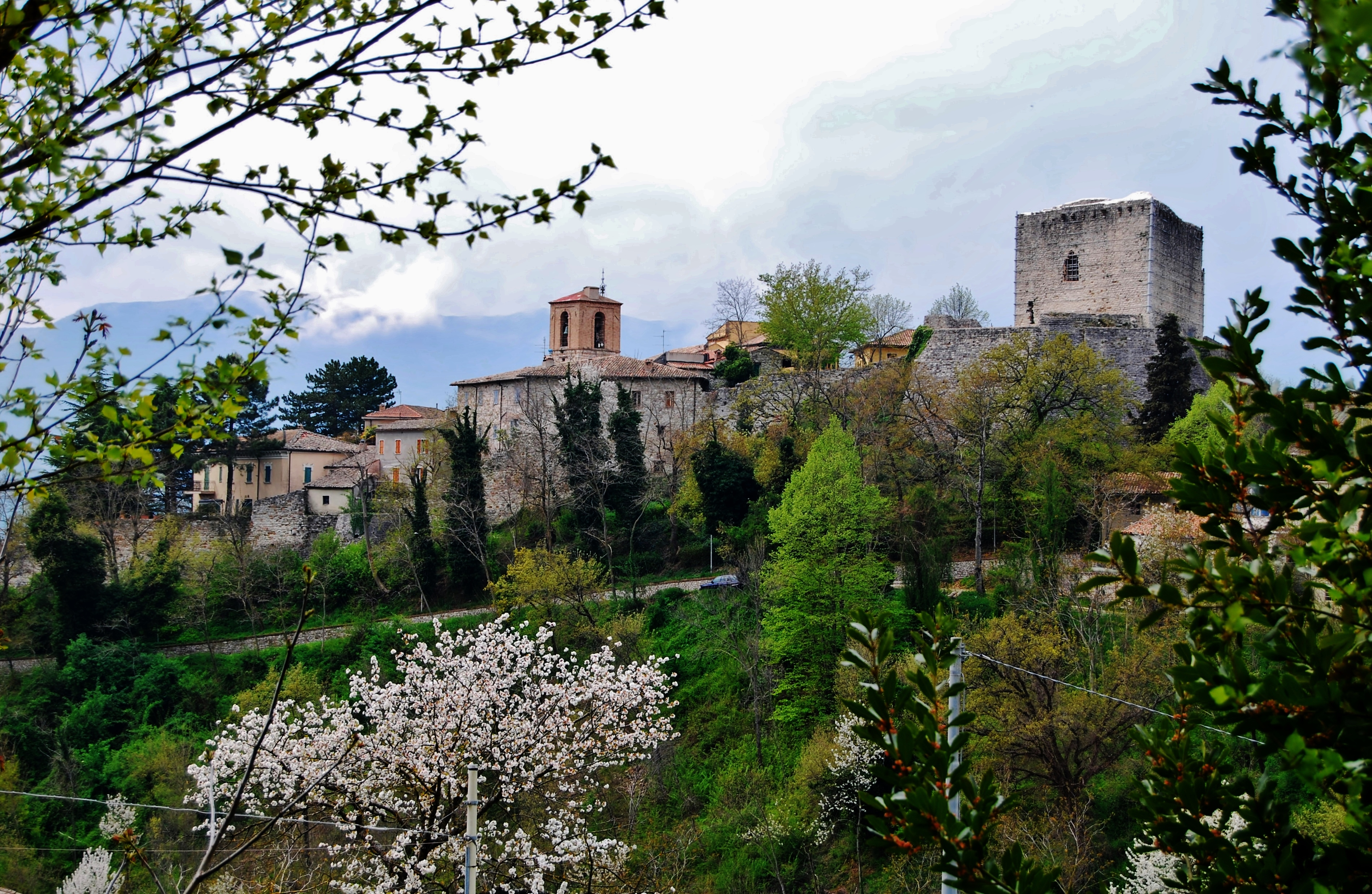

- Coat of arms

- Location within Italy Location within Marche
- Coordinates: 43°14′N 13°4′E
- Country: Italy
- Region: Marche
- Province: Macerata (MC)
- Frazioni: Acquosi, Casetre, Castellano, Celeano, Cerqueto, Collaiello, Selvalagli

Government
  - Mayor: mauro riccioni

Area
  - Total: 24.1 km^{2} (9.3 sq mi)
- Elevation: 484 m (1,588 ft)

Population (31 December 2008)
  - Total: 680
  - Density: 28/km^{2} (73/sq mi)
- Demonym: Gagliolesi
- Time zone: UTC+1 (CET)
  - Summer (DST): UTC+2 (CEST)
- Postal code: 62020
- Dialing code: 0737

Gagliole is a comune (municipality) in the Province of Macerata in the Italian region Marche, located about 60 kilometres (37 mi) southwest of Ancona and about 30 kilometres (19 mi) west of Macerata.

Among the churches in the town are:

- San Giovanni
- San Lorenzo a Torreto
- San Michele Arcangelo
- Eremo della Madonna delle Macchie
- Madonna della Pieve or Madonna di San Zenone
- San Giuseppe
