= Rocca Flea =

Coordinates: 43°13′59″N 12°47′19″E

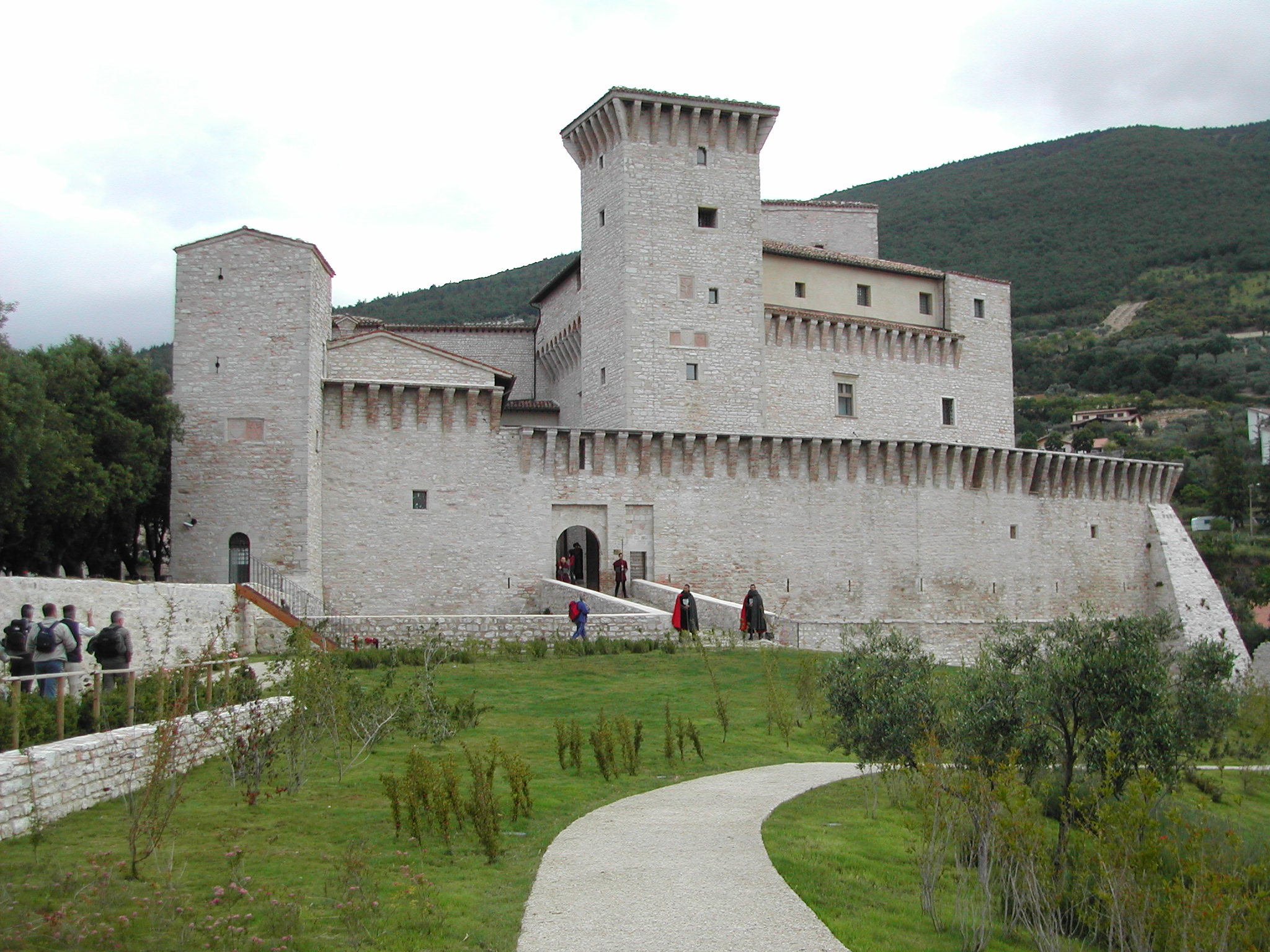
Rocca Flea, Gualdo Tadino.

The Rocca Flea (Italian: Flea Castle) is a fortified palace in Gualdo Tadino, Umbria, central Italy. It is located in the upper part of the hill on which the town lies.

== History ==
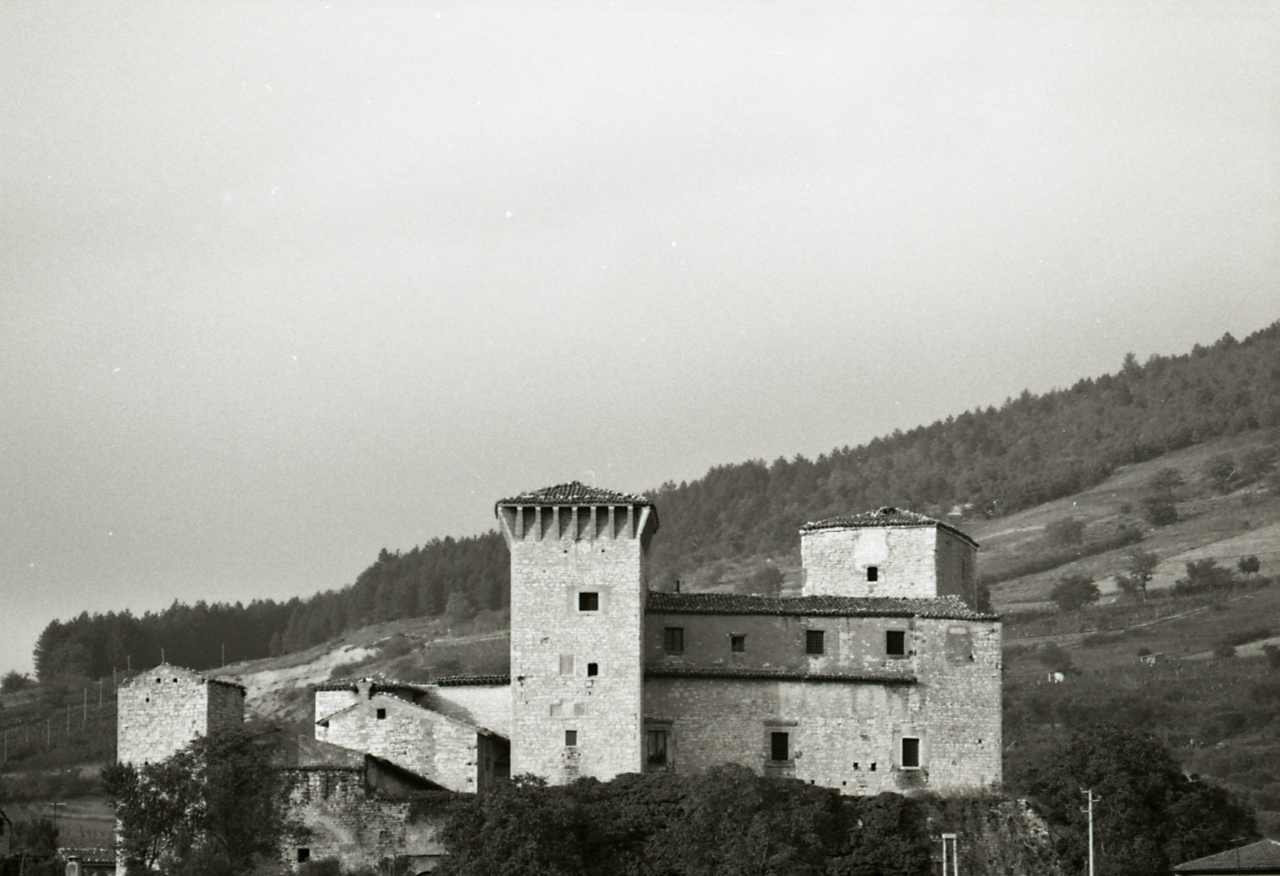
The Rocca Flea in a 1967 photo by Paolo Monti

Although it has been speculated that its construction could date to Lombard times, what is known with certainty is only that it predates the town's reconstruction in 1237. In 1242 it was rebuilt by Frederick II and was later frequently renovated: in 1350, during the Perugine domination, a central keep (Cassero) was added, while a few years later other intervention were carried on by Biordo Michelotti.

Cardinal Antonio Maria Ciocchi del Monte lived in the fortress from 1515 to 1533.

During the Renaissance the Rocca became a patrician residence, but in 1888 was turned into a prison.

It is now the seat of a ceramics museum and of an historical exhibition. Rocca Flea Museum official web site

== See also ==
- List of castles in Italy
