= Giovanni Boccati =

Italian painter

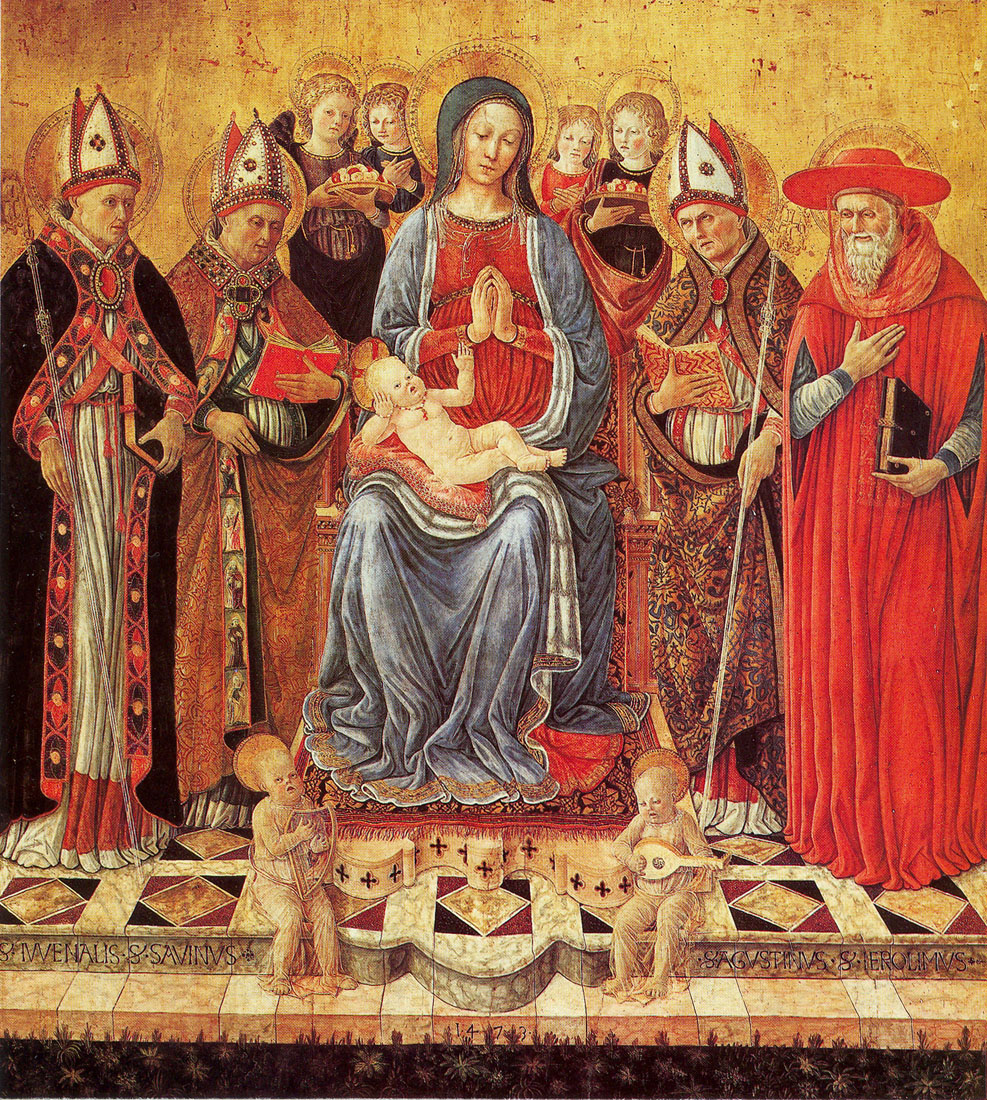
Giovanni Boccati, Mary on the throne with Saint Juvenal, Saint Sabinus, Saint Augustinus, Saint Jerome and six angels, 1473, Tempera on wood panel, 186,5х162 cm. Museum of Fine Arts, Budapest, Hungary

Giovanni Boccati or Giovanni di Pier Matteo Boccati (1409 – between 1486 and 1487) was an Italian painter.

== Biography ==
Boccati was born in Camerino, in the region of Marche. He lived and worked in Camerino, Padua, Perugia, and Urbino. His first documented work is the Madonna del Pergolato (1447); that painting, Madonna dell’Orchestra, and a Pietà (1479) are on display in the Galleria Nazionale dell’Umbria in Perugia. By 1445 he had become a citizen of Perugia.

It is not known where he was trained, but his painting suggests the influences of painters such as Fra Angelico, Filippo Lippi, and Domenico Veneziano.

He painted frescoes in the Palazzo Ducale in Urbino, and an altarpiece (1473) in Orvieto. In 1480, he was paid for two altarpieces in Perugia, now lost. Boccati's "Adoration of the Magi" is found in the Sinebrychoff Art Museum in Helsinki, Finland.

He painted a polyptych (1468) for the main altar of the church of Sant'Eustachio a Belforte del Chienti in the province of Macerata, Marche. The Polyptych depicts events in the life, martyrdom, and glory of Saint Eustachius, patron of the town. It also depicts a number of other saints, including the Magdalen, St Barbara, St Agatha, St Venantius, and St Anthony Abbot.
