= Gualdo Tadino =

- Comune
- Comune di Gualdo Tadino
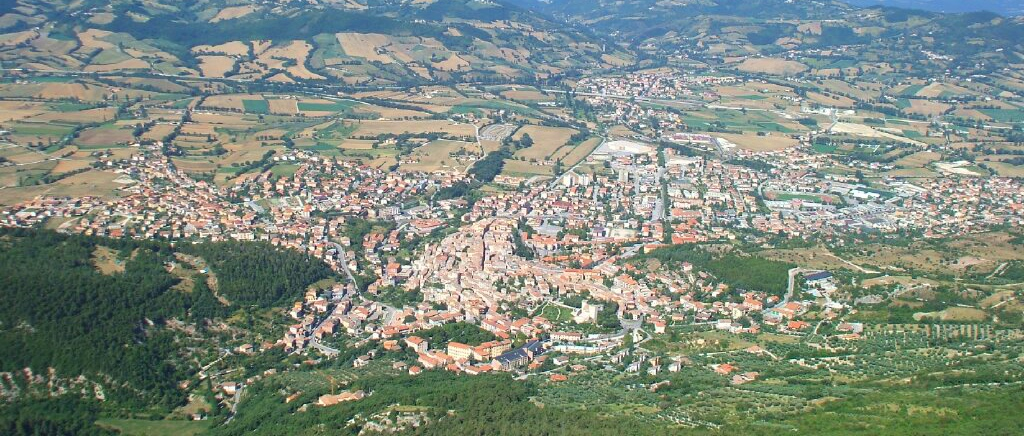
- Panorama of Gualdo Tadino

- Coat of arms

- Location of Gualdo Tadino in Italy Gualdo Tadino (Umbria)
- Coordinates: 43.230929°N 12.784801°E
- Country: Italy
- Region: Umbria
- Province: Perugia (PG)
- Frazioni: see list

Government
  - Mayor: Massimiliano Presciutti

Area
  - Total: 124 km^{2} (48 sq mi)
- Elevation: 536 m (1,759 ft)

Population (1 January 2025)
  - Total: 14,224
  - Density: 115/km^{2} (297/sq mi)
- Demonym: Gualdesi
- Time zone: UTC+1 (CET)
  - Summer (DST): UTC+2 (CEST)
- Postal code: 06023
- Dialing code: 075
- ISTAT code: 054023
- Patron saint: Blessed Angelo from Gualdo
- Saint day: January 15
- Website: Official website

Gualdo Tadino (Latin: Tadinum) is a town in the province of Perugia in northeastern Umbria, on the lower flanks of Monte Penna, a mountain of the Apennines. It is 47 kilometres (29 mi) northeast of Perugia.

== Etymology ==
The name Gualdo derives from the Lombardic term wald, meaning a wooded place.

== History ==
=== Antiquity ===
Gualdo Tadino derives from the ancient city of Tadinum, which stood in the plain below the present town, at a distance of a little more than 1 mile (1.6 km). The settlement, known in antiquity as Tarsina, was annexed by Rome in 266 BC and subsequently took the name Tadinum.

Tadinum is identified with Tagina, a city mentioned by Procopius, and was located along the Via Flaminia, where it was known for its springs, considered beneficial for health; a thermal establishment was built there at private expense by Omio Firmo.

In Roman times, Pliny the Elder placed Tadinum in the Regio VI Umbria. The ancient settlement was successively a free city, later a municipium, and then governed by a count and subsequently by a Roman patrician, as attested by inscriptions.

Christianity was brought to the area by Saint Felician. A bishopric was established in the 4th century, with bishops including Facondino of Tadino in the 4th century, Gaudenzio in 499, and Martino in 591.

The town suffered devastation in 409 during the march of Alaric toward Rome.

=== Early Middle Ages ===
In 545, during the Gothic War, Totila encamped at Tadinum. The ancient city was devastated by his forces and subsequently declined into a minor settlement.

In 552 Totila was defeated and killed at the nearby Battle of Taginae by the forces of Narses. Tradition holds that thousands of Goths fell in the surrounding valley, later known as the "valley of the rout" (vallata delle rotte) where a church dedicated to the Virgin was erected in thanksgiving for the victory.

Further destruction occurred under the Lombards, particularly during the reigns of Alboin and Liutprand, and later from Saracen incursions.

=== Reestablishment as Gualdo ===
During the early medieval period the town came under Lombard rule within the Duchy of Spoleto. In 996 the city was destroyed by Emperor Otto III after siding with Crescentius and the antipope John XVII. The surviving inhabitants dispersed, some seeking refuge in wooded areas or nearby strongholds such as Nocera.

The name Gualdo came into use after this phase, when the population resettled on nearby hills and in the Val di Gorgo.

In 1006 Pietro, son of Count Attone, founded a monastery dedicated to Saint Peter in the valley of Resina, inhabited for about a century by Benedictine nuns. The episcopal seat was transferred to Nocera in 1007.

Around 1180, in an effort to reunite the dispersed population, hermits founded a new castle on a hilltop, initially called Validum and later Gualdo. A major fire in the early 13th century caused widespread destruction.

In 1237, during the passage of Frederick II, a new settlement was established on a different site, enclosed by walls and granted privileges, including the right to self-government. This marked the foundation of the present Gualdo, which developed under imperial privilege and later under the protection of the Church and Perugia. In 1292 it submitted to Perugia.

The later 13th century was marked by frequent conflicts with neighboring cities, and in 1378 early municipal statutes were issued, drawn up by Bartolo di Sassoferrato.

Between the late 14th and the mid-15th century the town was governed by condottieri. In 1459 it was handed over to the Papal States in 1459 by Jacopo Piccinino. From 1513 to 1587 it functioned as an autonomous papal administrative seat.

A severe earthquake in 1751 caused extensive damage.

=== Modern era ===
Gualdo Tadino was elevated to the rank of city in 1833 by Pope Gregory XVI.

In the 19th century the city had a population of 6,422 inhabitants, of whom 2,364 lived within the town and 4,058 in the surrounding countryside.

In 1860 it was annexed to the Kingdom of Italy.

== Geography ==
Gualdo Tadino stands at an elevation of 535 metres (1,755 ft) above sea level. The Apennines rise to the north-east, while to the south and north-west extends a broad plain, at the center of which lie the remains of ancient Tadinum. The prominent Monte Nero rises steeply nearby, limiting the view on one side. The area is connected by routes crossing the Apennines, including paths leading toward the sources of the Giano and onward to Fabriano.

On Monte Penna there is a deposit of iron ore extending into the neighboring territory of Fabriano. Natural alteration of the ore produces ochres and pigments that were commercially exploited. The area also contains deposits of lithographic stone.

The climate is described as cold, with heavy snowfall and strong southern winds.

=== Subdivisions ===
The municipality includes the localities of Anguillara, Borgonovo, Boschetto, Broccaro, Busche, Caprara, Case Biagetto, Case Fornaci, Case Genni, Castellare, Categge, Cerasa, Cerqueto, Corcia, Crocicchio, Crocicchio Basso, Gaifana, Grello, Gualdo Tadino, Madonna del Gambero, Morano Madonnuccia, Morano Osteria, Palazzetto, Palazzo Mancinelli-Vaccara, Pastina, Petroia, Piagge, Pieve di Compresseto, Poggio Sant'Ercolano, Rasina, Roveto, San Lazzaro, San Lorenzo, San Pellegrino, Santa Croce, Sassuolo, Toccio, Voltole.

In 2021, 1,426 people lived in rural dispersed dwellings not assigned to any named locality. At the time, the most populous locality was Gualdo Tadino proper (8,993). The following localities had no recorded permanent residents: Cugiano.

== Economy ==
In the 19th century the principal industry was the production of ceramics, both utilitarian and artistic, using traditional kiln techniques. The territory also supported agricultural production, including wine, oil and cereals. The presence of iron deposits supported extractive activity.

== Religion ==
=== San Benedetto ===
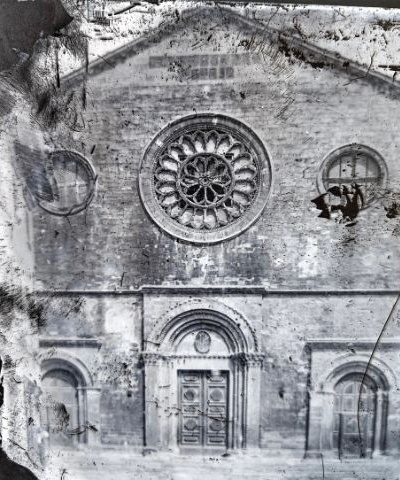
The Cathedral of Gualdo Tadino in the late 19th century

The church of San Benedetto was founded in 1251 by the abbot Guglielmo, who transferred there monks previously established since 1006 in a monastery near the town. An inscription on the eastern side records its foundation. The façade has three portals and three large upper windows, with finely carved capitals. Inside, the second altar on the right contains a copy of Raphael's Madonna of Foligno by Avanzino Nucci.

The third altar preserves an altar table supported by spiral columns with richly decorated capitals, a work of the 12th century originating from one of the churches of ancient Tadinum. The apse frescoes are by Matteo da Gualdo. Behind the sacristy is a five-part tempera panel of the 15th century depicting Saint Facondinus, Saint Michael the Archangel, Saint Benedict, the Blessed Angelo of Gualdo, and Christ blessing.

The church also preserves a finely worked silver processional cross dated 1481. Another tempera panel with gold background representing the Virgin and Child is attributed to Matteo da Gualdo. The church was later enlarged and restored according to a design by the architect Vespignani.

=== Santa Maria ===
The church of Santa Maria contains, of note, a fresco of the Perugian school on the left side and an oil painting on the high altar representing the Annunciation, attributed to Pomarancio.

=== San Francesco ===
The church of San Francesco, erected in the 13th century in squared white limestone, has a reconstructed façade incorporating sculptures from the original front. The interior includes a fresco above the entrance depicting Saint Julian killing his parents, and two lateral tabernacles with Saints John the Baptist and Bernardino of Siena. The second altar contains a signed tempera panel dated 1471, while another panel of the Virgin and Child reflects the manner of Cimabue. The pavement contains the tomb of Andrea di Pietro dei Benci, counsellor of Sigismund II. The high altar retains an ancient altar table supported by elegant columns. Above the sacristy door is a painted cross attributed to Margheritone. In the adjoining cloister there is a Roman funerary urn of fine workmanship from the ruins of Tadinum.

=== Santissima Annunziata ===
The church of the Santissima Annunziata contains, in the second chapel on the left, a tempera panel representing the Virgin and Child, described as a work of Byzantine art. Behind the high altar are additional tempera panels painted in the 15th century by a pupil of Matteo da Gualdo. In the sacristy are two paintings by Sermei, depicting Saint Francis receiving the stigmata and Saint John in the desert.

=== Congregation of Charity ===
Works formerly kept in the halls of the Congregation of Charity include a triptych and a tempera panel regarded among the principal works of Matteo da Gualdo, now preserved in the pinacoteca.

=== Churches in surrounding areas ===
In the surrounding area, the church of San Facondino preserves a gold-ground triptych of the local school, and in the sacristy are 14th-century statues of the Virgin with Child and two angels.

The church of San Pellegrino contains a stone tabernacle dated 1521 and a large tempera triptych attributed to Matteo da Gualdo, as well as frescoes depicting episodes from the life of Saint Pellegrino.

The church of Santa Maria in Asciano has a triptych at the high altar representing the Virgin, Christ, and various saints, reflecting the style of Matteo da Gualdo.

== Culture ==
=== Rocca Flea ===
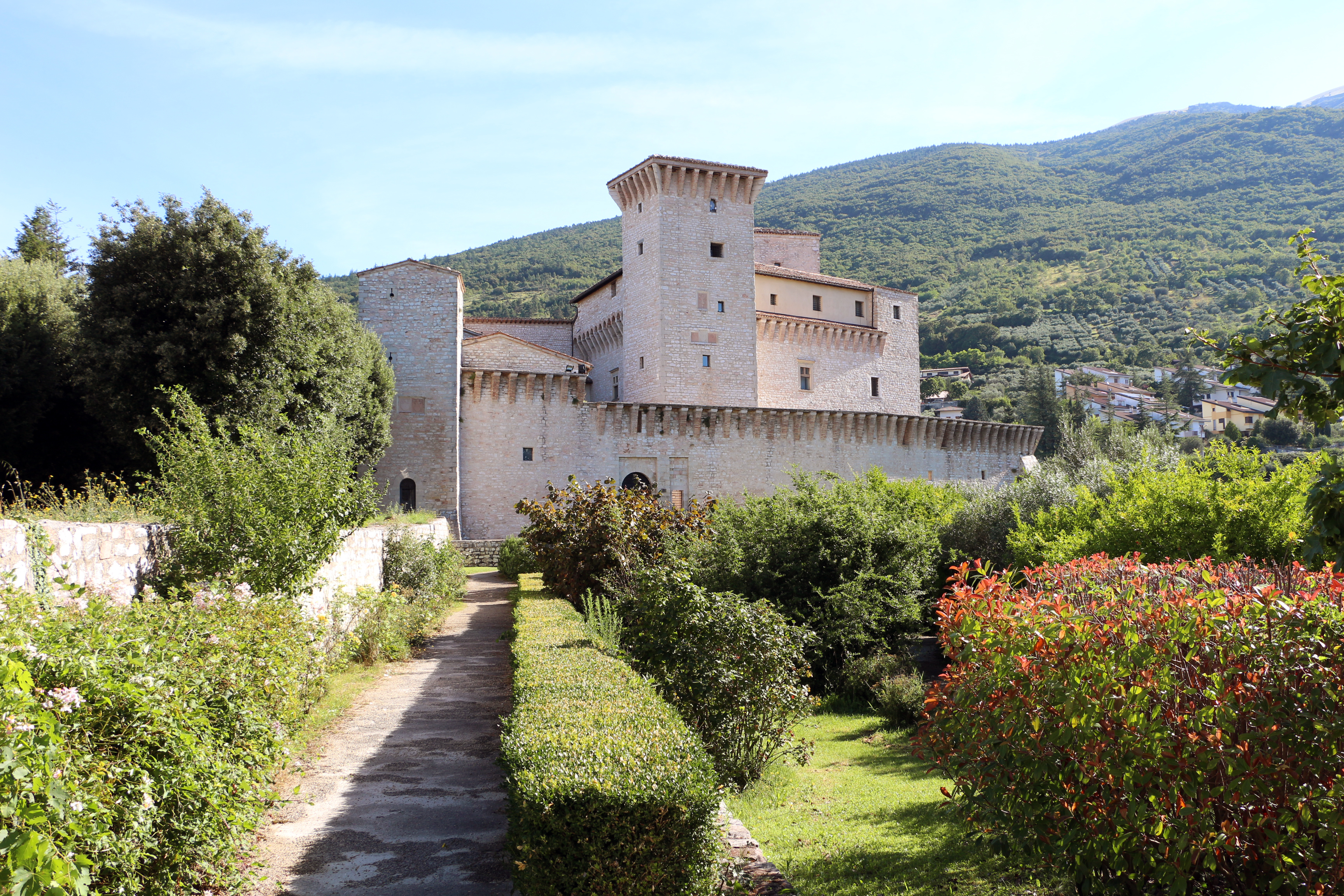
Rocca Flea, a fortified complex with crenellated walls and a central keep

Rocca Flea stands above the medieval town, dominating the settlement from the top of the hill. Also known as "Flebea", it is associated with the nearby river Flebeo. The structure is organized around a central courtyard with a fountain and includes multiple buildings, over forty rooms, four towers with internal courtyards, and defensive walls with walkways and an angular buttress. It was originally surrounded by a moat and accessed by a drawbridge on the southern side.

Founded around the 10th century and linked to the counts of Nocera, it later belonged to the Atti family of Foligno before passing under the authority of Pope Innocent III in 1198. In the early 13th century it was contested between Gubbio and Perugia. In 1240 Frederick II resided there and promoted works of expansion and restoration, including the construction of the city walls.

In 1394 Biordo Michelotti stayed in the fortress, which was then also known as Arx Maior Terre Gualdi. In 1434 it was granted as a vicariate to Count Francesco I Sforza by Pope Eugene IV. Toward the end of the 15th century it was used as a clandestine mint by Filippo degli Arcioni of Rome.

From 1513 to 1587 it housed the Lega Cardinalizia Autonoma, during which time the interiors were modified and decorated. After 1587 it became the residence of papal officials until 1798. In the 19th century it was used as a women's prison, and after Italian unification until 1985 it functioned as a district prison.

Restoration works carried out in the late 20th century led to the discovery of the chapel of Sant'Angelo de Flea at the base of the keep and brought to light frescoes from the 14th and 15th centuries. Since 1999 the complex has housed the civic museum and an antiquarium with archaeological finds documenting settlement in the area from prehistory to the early Middle Ages.

=== Museo Regionale dell'Emigrazione ===
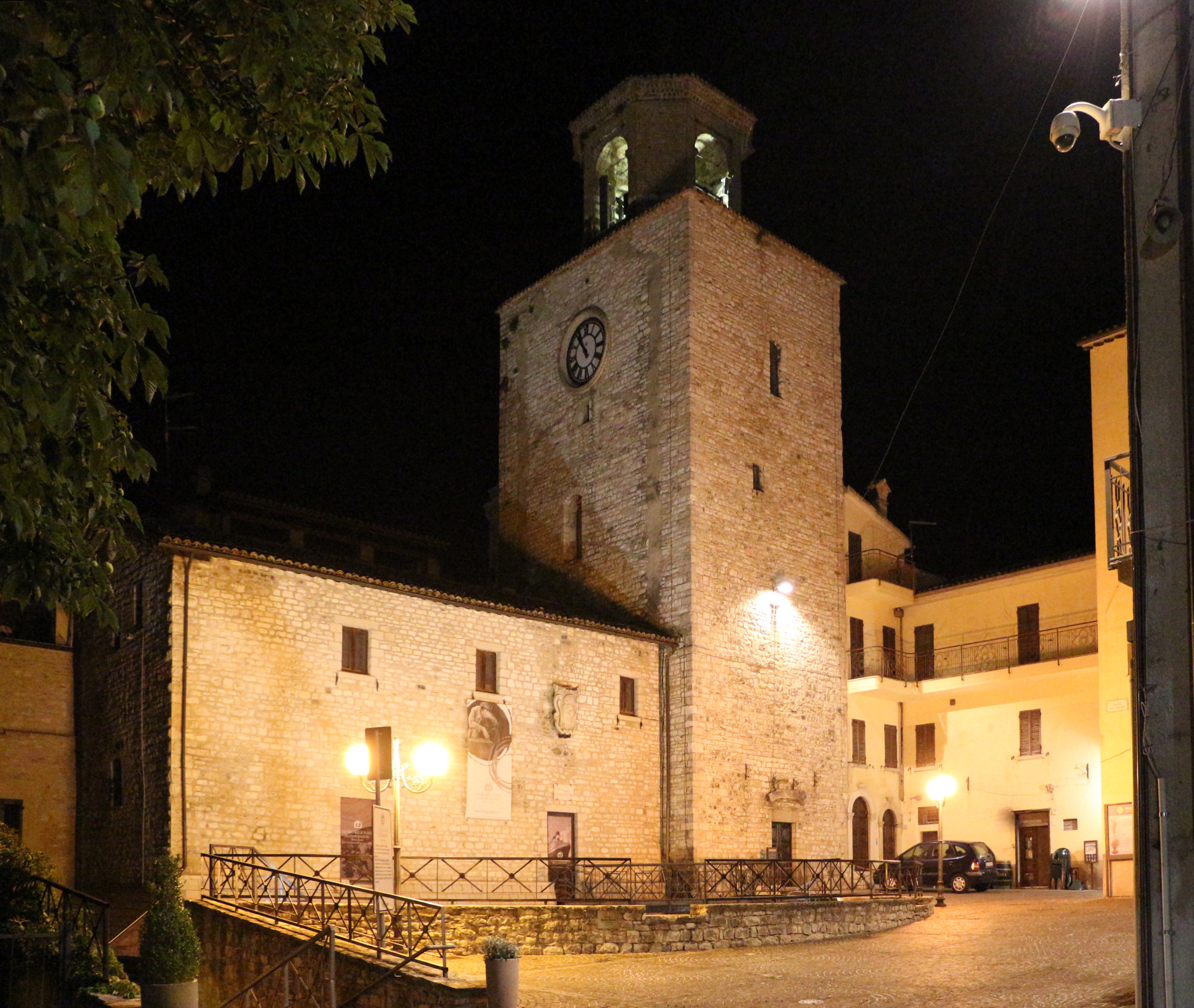
Palazzo del Podestà, now housing the emigration museum, featuring a stone tower with clock face

The Museo Regionale dell'Emigrazione is housed in the Palazzo del Podestà in the historic center. The building was formerly the residence of the podestà, of which the 13th-century civic tower remains, later topped with a Baroque lantern.

The museum is dedicated to the history of Italian emigration from the late 19th century to the 1960s. It preserves documents, images and objects relating to migration abroad and functions as a research and documentation center on Umbrian emigration. Its collections include a video collection with archival footage and a specialized library. The exhibition route presents themes of departure, journey and arrival, including aspects such as work and travel conditions.

=== Palazzo Comunale ===
The Palazzo Comunale was built after the destruction of the earlier Palazzo dei Rettori delle Arti e dei Priori in the earthquake of 1751. The earlier building is thought to have dated to around 1246, though documentation is limited.

Construction of the present building began in 1768, following plans prepared in 1756 during the commissariamento of the Flaviani. The works were directed by Domenico Fontana on a design by Clemente Orlandi and were completed the following year by a Lombard contractor.

The council chamber contains decorative paintings by Rodolfo Rossi and Clodomiro Menichetti, dated 1909, depicting episodes from the history of Gualdo and local figures, including scenes such as the Battle of Taginae and the workshop of Matteo da Gualdo.

=== Ceramics ===
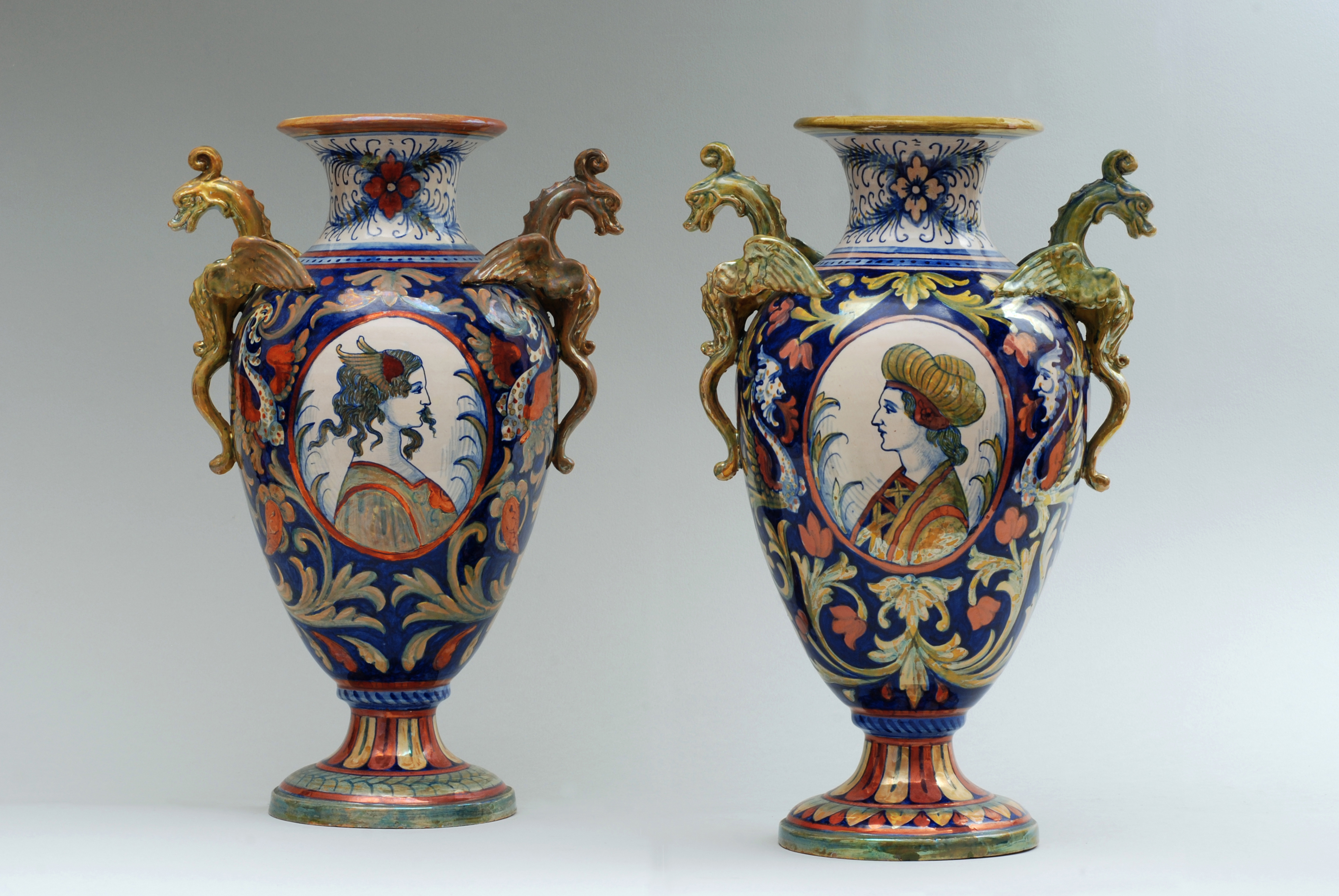
Maiolica vases by Lorenzo Rubboli, with painted medallion portraits framed by scrolling foliage on a cobalt ground

Gualdo Tadino was an early center of ceramic production. The forests of the Apennines supplied wood for kilns, while streams powered mills used to grind glazes. Iron oxide, used for the gold and ruby luster effects, came from the Monte Fringuello quarry, and high-quality clay was obtained from the Matalotta quarries.

The first written records of ceramic supply date to the 14th century, with forms and decorations recalling types found in the areas of Gubbio, Orvieto, and Deruta. In the second half of the 15th century, documents attest to the recognized quality of local maiolica, including authorization in 1456 for the sale of ceramics such as olle and pignatte in the markets of Gubbio.

Between the 16th and 17th centuries, production included the use of luster techniques, involving a further firing that produced gold and ruby reflections. In the 17th century, ceramists from Gualdo Tadino worked outside the region, including Antonio and Lorenzo Pignani, active in Rome; in 1673 Pope Clement X granted them exclusive rights to apply gold to maiolica using a new technique.

A further phase of development occurred in the second half of the 19th century with the revival of metallic luster techniques by Paolo Rubboli, leading to renewed production of artistic maiolica. Traditional decorative motifs include grotesques, foliage, scales, and quartered patterns, often on a blue ground and combined with classical subjects, finished with gold and ruby luster in kilns known as muffole, also described in I tre libri del vasaio by Cipriano Piccolpasso.

=== Tadinum archaeological area ===
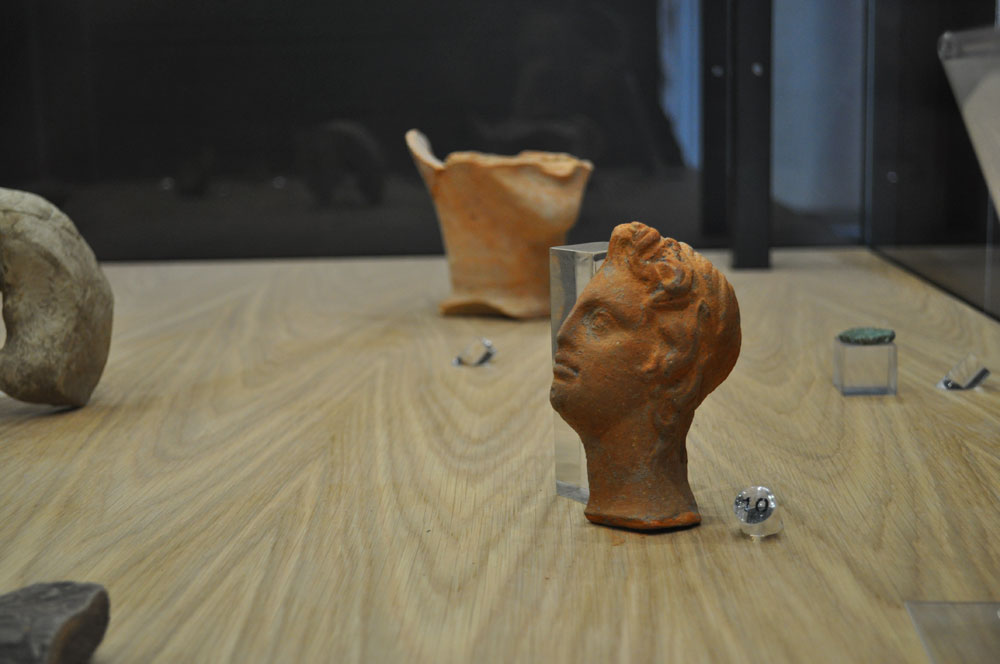
Terracotta votive head displayed among ceramic finds from the Tadinum area

Colle I Mori is an archaeological site corresponding to the ancient settlement of Tadinum, mentioned in the Iguvine Tablets. The earliest excavations, conducted in 1935 on the summit of the hill, revealed the remains of a rectangular sacellum as well as schematic Italic bronze figurines. Visible features still include a rock-cut well and traces of an artificial fortification. Later excavations have broadly outlined the size and characteristics of the settlement, which extended over approximately five to six hectares and was arranged on artificial terraces. Archaeological evidence has revealed numerous domestic structures, typically composed of three rooms with rectangular plans and likely equipped with porticoes.

The settlement at Colle I Mori spans a chronological range from the late 6th century to the 3rd–2nd century BCE. It constitutes a rare example of proto-urban organization in Umbrian territory.

Associated with the settlement is the rich necropolis of San Facondino, whose tombs date from the 7th century BCE to the Late Imperial period. Some burials contained particularly rich grave goods, including pottery, bronze tools, and Attic red-figure vases. These materials are now preserved in the National Etruscan Museum in Rome.

The urban area of the municipium of Tadinum has been identified in the locality of Sant'Antonio di Rasina. Remains of necropoleis and rural villas have been found both along the Via Flaminia and in the foothill and hilly zones.

Excavations initiated in 2004 include three main building complexes: public baths, a market area likely identifiable as the forum pecuarium (livestock market), and a large domus. Immediately south of the baths lies a large artificial terrace bordered to the east by a series of rooms. The earliest of these, decorated with geometric motifs and dated to around 100 BCE, is probably identifiable as the sacellum of Hercules mentioned in a 2nd-century CE inscription found nearby. The overall layout suggests the presence of the commercial forum of the municipium.

The domus of Tadinum is a large residential complex located south of the forum pecuarium. The western sector includes rooms paved in cocciopesto with geometric decoration. In the early decades of the 2nd century CE, a small private bath complex was added to the eastern side, featuring mosaic floors and associated basins. The mosaic, composed of white and pink tesserae, depicts a marine scene dominated by Neptune riding a chariot drawn by sea horses, surrounded by fish and mollusks, representing a high level of artistic and cultural refinement.

The Gothic king Totila was buried at Capras, identified with modern Caprara, a hamlet of Gualdo Tadino.

== Notable people ==
Among figures associated with Gualdo Tadino are the jurists Giandiletto Durante, Nicolò Morone and Giambattista Spinola, and Mansueto Rosati. In medicine, Castore Durante served as physician to Pope Sixtus V and was also a poet. In the arts, Matteo da Gualdo and Avanzino Nucci are noted painters. Giulio Gualdese was the author of works on the plague and on thermal baths.

Other figures include Pietro di Giunta, counsellor to Emperor Sigismund; Monsignor Umeoli, chamberlain of the Holy Church at the end of the 15th century; Monsignor Francesco Bonfigli, general of the Conventual Franciscans; Monsignor Porfirio Felizioni, secretary to Pope Paul V; and the marquis Giacomo Mattioli, counsellor to the Duke of Parma.

Among notable religious figures associated with the city are the Blessed Peregrino (d. 1004), the Blessed Majo (d. 1270), Marzio da Pieve di Compresseto (d. 1324), the Blessed Angelo, regarded as protector of the city (d. 1324), and the Blessed Pietro (d. 1367).

The burial site of Totila was traditionally identified on a nearby hill known as Capra (later Capraia), where remains of a tomb were still visible. Following the victory, a church known as Madonna delle Rotte was erected on the plain.

Among the distinguished families of the city are the noble Calvi, Coppari, Sinibaldi, Cajani, and Mattioli.

== Twin towns ==
Gualdo Tadino sister cities are: West Pittston, PA (USA) and Audun-le-Tiche, France.
