= San Catervo, Tolentino =

Church in Tolentino, Italy

Coordinates: 43.2096°N 13.2879°E

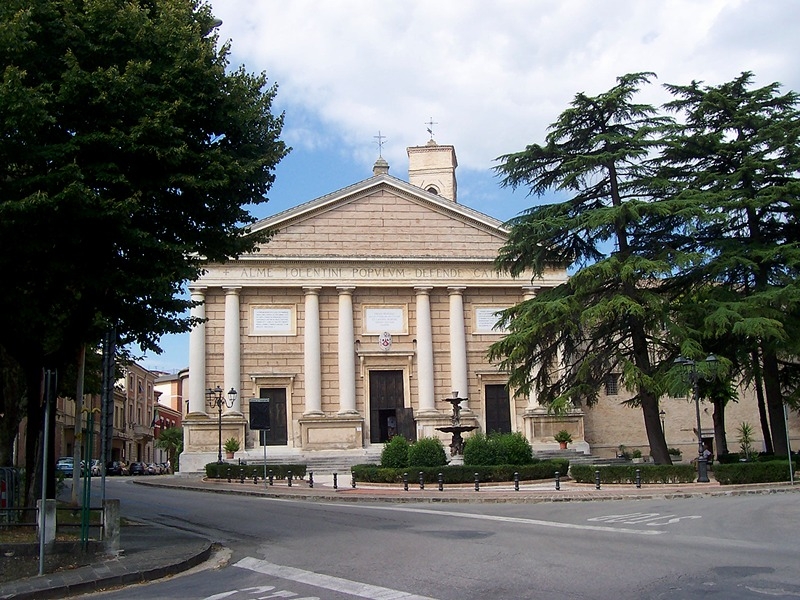
Neoclassical façade.

The Cathedral of San Catervo is a Roman Catholic church located in Tolentino, Province of Macerata, Marche. The 13th-century Gothic style church is now generally contained by a newer Neoclassical facade.

== History ==
A church or chapel dedicated to Saint Catervus existed at the site and was rebuilt by Benedictine monks, starting in 1256. The presbytery of the prior gothic-style church stood at the site of the modern facade. At the time, the Chapel of San Catervo, now called the Chapel of the Santissimi Trinità was erected. In 1820, a reconstruction began, initially guided by the painter Giuseppe Lucatelli and followed by an architect from Macerata, Conte Spada. The portal on the left side of the church belongs to the original church.

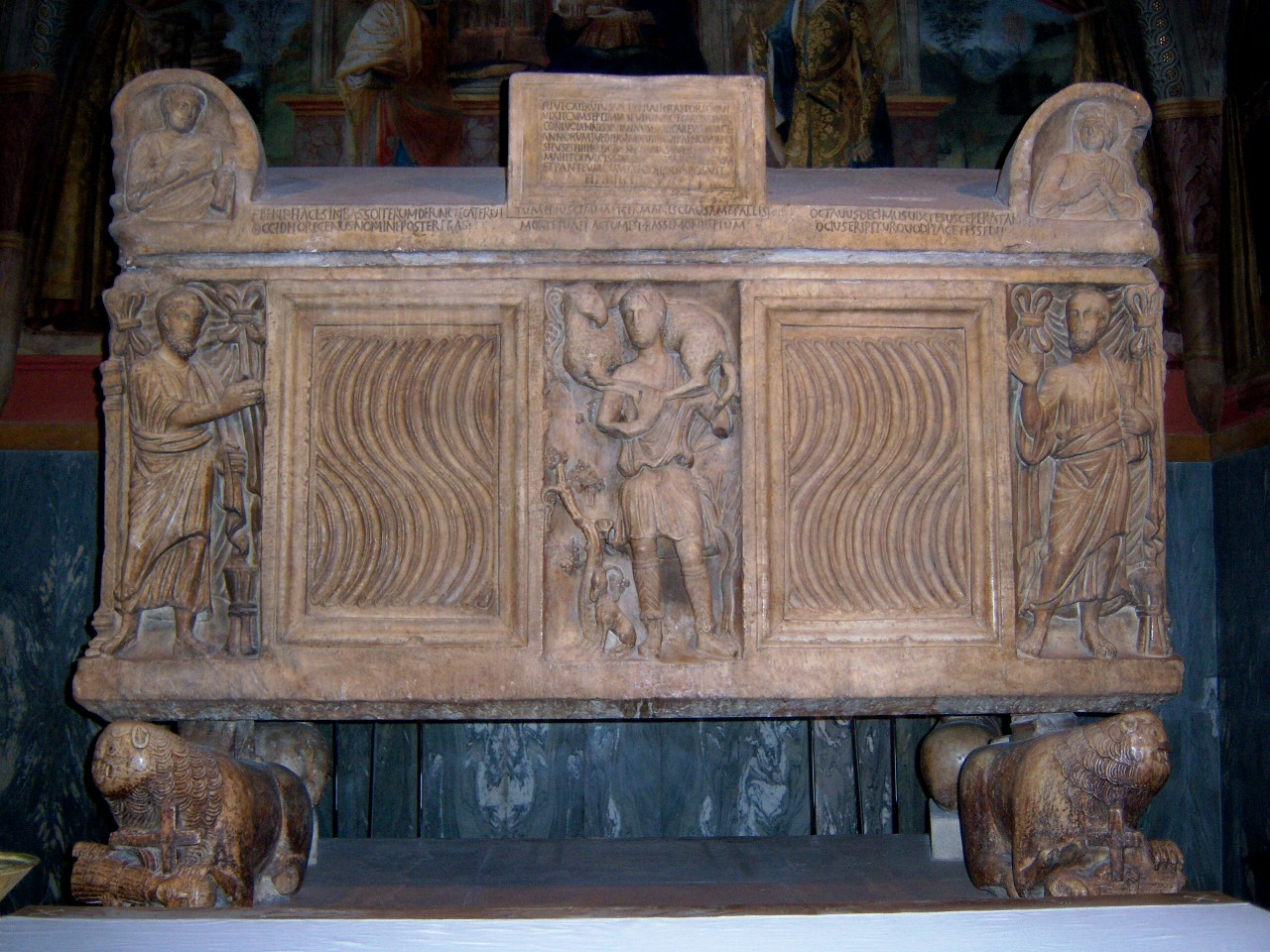
Roman sarcophagus in Chapel of San Catervo

The Chapel of San Catervo contains a delicately carved 4th-century marble Ancient Roman sarcophagus, which retains its original dedicatory inscription to Flavius Julius Catervus, a noble of senatorial rank, who had been prefect and died at the age of 56 yrs. Tradition holds that he brought Christianity to Tolentino. The 15th century frescoes in the chapel are attributed to Francesco da Tolentino; the depict the Evangelists and Sibyls, a Madonna and Child with Saints Catervus and Sebastian, an Adoration of the Magi, and a Crucifixion.
