= Marchisiano da Tolentino =

Italian painter

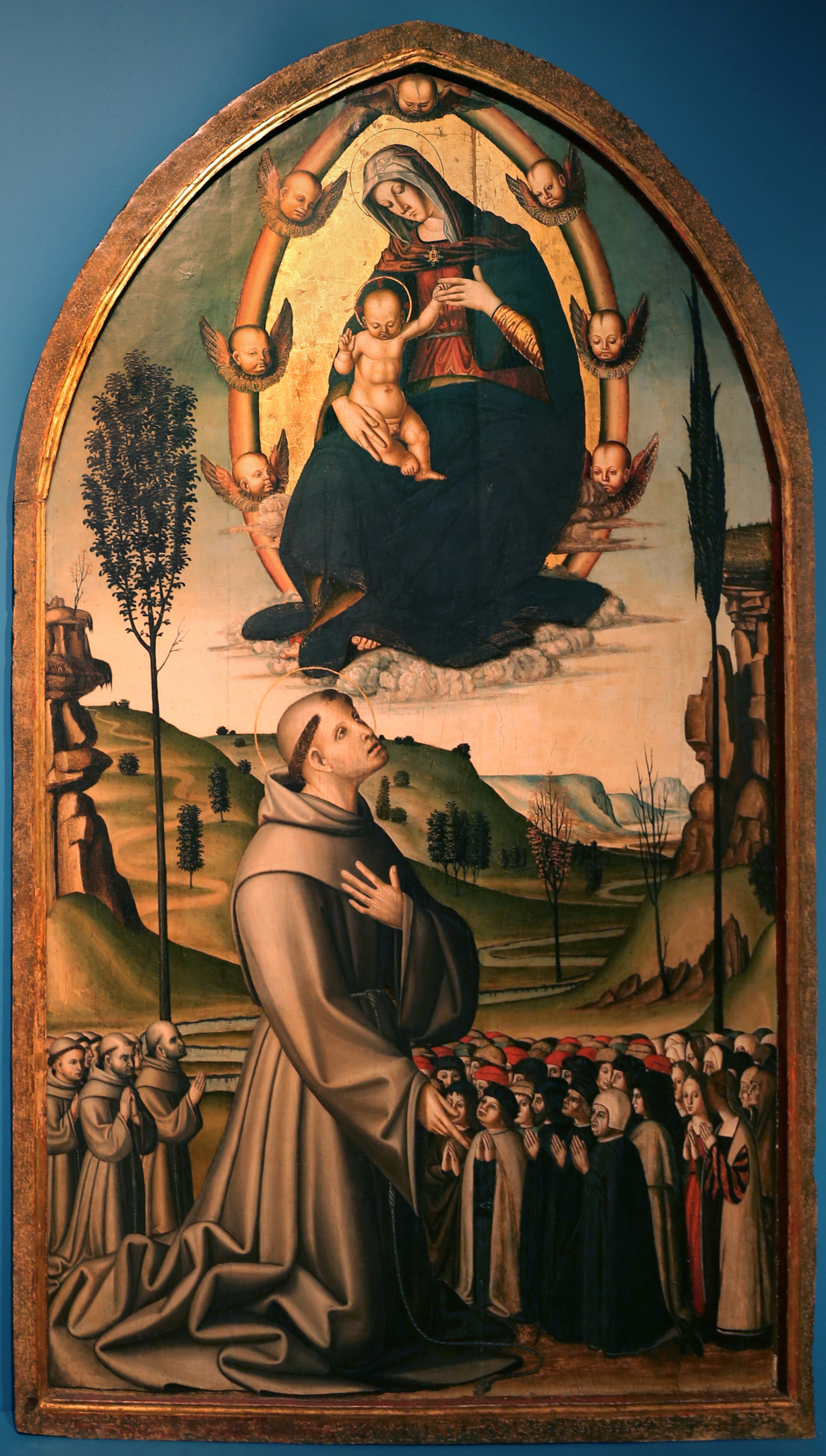
Madonna and Saints, Sarnano

Marchisiano da Tolentino (active 1496–1543), also known as Marchisiano di Giorgio da Tolentino, was an Italian painter, born and active in his native Tolentino, Italy.

He led a tumultuous life, and was pardoned of a murder charge by Pope Julius II. One of his pupils was Giovanni Andrea de Magistris (father of Simone de Magistris), a 16th-century painter from Caldarola. Marchisiano in 1506 painted the frescoes of the Chapel of San Catervo in the Cathedral of Tolentino; these were once attributed to Francesco da Tolentino. He also painted a lunette (1518) for the church of San Nicola, now present in the Museo dell'Opera della Basilica, depicting a Deposition; this was once part of a larger altarpiece.
