= Caramoor =

Caramoor may refer to:

- Caramoor International Music Festival, held at
- Caramoor Center for Music and the Arts Inc., a former estate listed on the National Register of Historic Places near Katonah, New York
