= Emidio =

Emidio is a given name. Notable people with the name include:

- Emidio Campi (born 1943), Swiss historian
- Emidio Cavigioli (1925–2015), Italian professional footballer
- Emidio De Felice (1918–1993), Italian linguist and lexicographer
- Emidio Graca (1931–1992), former Portuguese footballer
- Emidio Greco (1938–2012), Italian film director and screenwriter
- Emidio Massi (1922–2016), Italian Socialist politician, former President of Marche
- Ruggero Luigi Emidio Antici Mattei (1811–1883), Italian Cardinal of the Roman Catholic Church
- Emidio Morganti (born 1966), Italian football referee
- Emidio Oddi (born 1956), retired Italian professional football player
- Emidio Pallotta (1803–1868), Italian painter and architect
- Emidio Pesce (born 2002), Italian racing driver
- Emidio Rafael (born 1986), retired Portuguese footballer
- Emidio Recchioni (1864–1933), Italian anarchist involved in a plot to kill Benito Mussolini
- Ricardo Emidio Ramalho da Silva (born 1975), Portuguese retired professional footballer
- Emidio Soltysik (1974–2020), American political activist for the Socialist Party USA
- Emidio Taliani (1838–1907), Italian Cardinal of the Roman Catholic Church
- Flavio Emidio dos Santos Vieira (born 1970), Brazilian goalkeeper

== See also ==
- Manoel Emidio, municipality in the state of Piauí in Northeast Brazil
- Rancho San Emidio, 17,710-acre Mexican land grant in present-day Kern County, California
- SS Emidio, 6912-ton tanker of the Socony-Vacuum Oil Company, the first casualty of Japanese submarine action on California's Pacific Coast
- San Emidio Geothermal Plant in Washoe County, Nevada, a geothermal power plant
