= Nicola Vaccai =

Italian composer and singing teacher

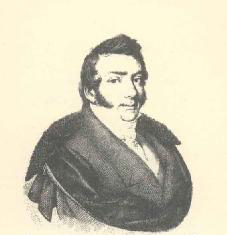
- Born: 15 March 1790; Tolentino, Italy
- Died: 5 August 1848 (aged 58); Tolentino, Italy
- Occupations: Composer; Academic teacher
- Organizations: Milan Conservatory

Nicola Vaccai (15 March 1790 – 5 or 6 August 1848) was an Italian composer, particularly of operas, and a voice teacher.

== Life and career as a composer ==
Born at Tolentino, he grew up in Pesaro, and studied music there until his parents sent him to Rome to study law. Having no intention of becoming a lawyer, he took voice lessons and eventually studied counterpoint with Giuseppe Jannaconi, an important Roman composer. When Vaccai turned twenty one, he went to Naples and became a disciple of Paisiello, whose Barber of Seville was considered a comic masterpiece until Rossini's Barber swept it from the stage 35 years later.

Vaccai launched his career in Venice, initially earning his living by writing ballets and teaching voice. He had his first operatic success with I solitari di Scozia in Naples in 1815. In Parma he was commissioned to write Pietro il grande, where he was also one of the soloists in the first performance. This was followed by Zadig e Astartea (Naples, 1825) and then his best known opera Giulietta e Romeo (Milan, 1825).

Vaccai's sojourn in London began with a production of his most successful opera, Giulietta e Romeo, at Kings Theatre in April, 1832. His charm and continental reputation ingratiated him to society and soon he was much sought after as a teacher.

Ending his wanderings with a return to Italy, in 1838 Vaccai became a director and professor of composition at the Milan Conservatory where his students included Giovanni Bottesini and Luigi Arditi. After six years he retired on account of poor health to his boyhood home, Pesaro, where he wrote his sixteenth opera. He died there in 1848.

== Work as a teacher of singing: his Metodo pratico di canto ==
Later eclipsed as an opera composer by his rival Bellini, Vaccai is now chiefly remembered as a voice teacher. One of his notable students was soprano Marianna Barbieri-Nini. Vaccai wrote many books, one of which is his 1832 Metodo pratico di canto (Practical Vocal Method), which has been transposed to accommodate different voice types such as alto or low ranges such as bass in order to instruct students in the method of singing in the Italian legato style. It is still in print and is used as a teaching tool.

In his introduction, Vaccai notes that only the voice of a master demonstrating his exercises accurately can instruct a student in the correct techniques of true legato singing. The book is also an important source of information about the performance of early 19th-century opera.

Voice teacher Elio Battaglia edited a new teacher's edition of the "Metodo pratico" or "Practical Method of Italian Singing" which was published by Ricordi in 1990, accompanied by a CD of examples.

On September 15, 2020, Teatro Nuovo (New York) released "Bel Canto in Thirty Minutes", a complete recording of the "Practical Method of Italian Singing", led by Will Crutchfield and featuring 22 singers including Santiago Ballerini, Lawrence Brownlee, Teresa Castillo, Junhan Choi, Georgia Jarman, Alisa Jordheim, Hannah Ludwig, Christine Lyons, Megan Marino, Dorian McCall, Madison Marie McIntosh, Angela Meade, Tamara Mumford, Lisette Oropesa, Daniel Mobbs, Jennifer Rowley, Nicholas Simpson, Michael Spyres, Derrek Stark, Alina Tamborini, Hans Tashjian, and Meigui Zhang.

== Operas ==
Title	City and theatre	Date of Première
I solitari di Scozia	Naples, Teatro Nuovo	18 February 1815
Malvina	Venice, Teatro San Benedetto	8 June 1816
Il lupo di Ostenda, ossia L'innocenza salvata dalla colpa	Venice, Teatro San Benedetto	17 June 1818
Pietro il grande, ossia Un geloso alla tortura	Parma, Teatro Ducale, now Teatro Regio	17 January 1824
La pastorella feudataria	Turin, Teatro Carignano	18 September 1824
Zadig ed Astartea	Naples, Teatro San Carlo	21 February 1825
Giulietta e Romeo	Milan, Teatro della Canobbiana	31 October 1825
Bianca di Messina	Turin, Teatro Regio	20 January 1826
Il precipizio, o Le fucine di Norvegia	Milan, Teatro alla Scala	16 August 1826
Giovanna d'Arco	Venice, Teatro La Fenice	17 February 1827
Saladino e Clotilde	Milan, Teatro alla Scala	4 February 1828
Azmir e Netzareo	Madrid, Principe	28 June 1828
Alexi	Naples, Teatro San Carlo	6 July 1828
Saul	Naples, Teatro San Carlo	11 March 1829, but composed between 1825 and 1826
Giovanna Gray	Milan, Teatro alla Scala	23 February 1836
Marco Visconti	Turin, Teatro Regio	27 January 1838
La sposa di Messina	Venice, Teatro La Fenice	2 March 1839
Virginia	Rome, Teatro Apollo	14 January 1845

== Legacy ==
Teatro Nicola Vaccaj, the opera house in Tolentino, is named after the musician.
