= Sacro Cuore di Gesù =

Sacro Cuore di Gesù may refer to the following churches in Italy:

- Sacro Cuore di Gesu, Baragalla
- Sacro Cuore di Gesù, Tolentino
- Sacro Cuore di Gesù a Castro Pretorio
- Sacro Cuore di Gesù agonizzante a Vitinia

== See also ==
- Sacro Cuore (disambiguation)
