= Gottardi =

Gottardi is an Italian surname. Notable people with the surname include:

- Donata Gottardi, Italian politician
- Eduardo Gottardi, Brazilian footballer
- Giovanni Gottardi, Italian painter
- Gottardo Gottardi, Swiss chess player
- Guerino Gottardi, Italian footballer
- Hugo Gottardi, Argentine footballer and coach
- Jefferson Gottardi, Bolivian footballer
- José Gottardi, Uruguayan Archbishop
- Roberto Gottardi, Italian-Cuban architect
- Vittore Gottardi (1941–2015), Swiss footballer
- Vittorio Gottardi (born 18 March 1967), Swiss footballer
