= Graça (name) =

Graça or Graca is a Portuguese surname and given name. Notable people with the name include:

== Surname ==
- Ailton Graça (born 1964), Brazilian actor
- Alberto Graça (1918–?), Portuguese sailor
- Ary Graça, Brazilian volleyball player
- Carlos Graça (1931–2013), São Toméan politician
- Dias Graça (born 1964), Brazilian footballer
- Emídio Graça (1931–1992), Portuguese footballer
- Jaime Graça (1942–2012), Portuguese football player and coach
- João Graça (born 1995), Portuguese footballer
- Marco Da Graca (born 2002), Italian footballer
- Marvin da Graça (born 1995), Luxembourg footballer
- Ricardo Graça (born 1997), Brazilian footballer

== Given name ==
- Graça Aranha (1868–1931), Brazilian writer and diplomat
- Graça Fonseca (born 1971), Portuguese politician
- Graça Freitas (born 1957), Portuguese physician
- Graça Machel (born 1945), Mozambican politician and humanitarian

== See also ==
- Graça, municipality in Ceará, Brazil
