= Basilica of Saint Nicholas of Tolentino =

Church in Tolentino, Marche, Italy

Basilica of Saint Nicholas of Tolentino Basilica di San Nicola a Tolentino (in Italian)
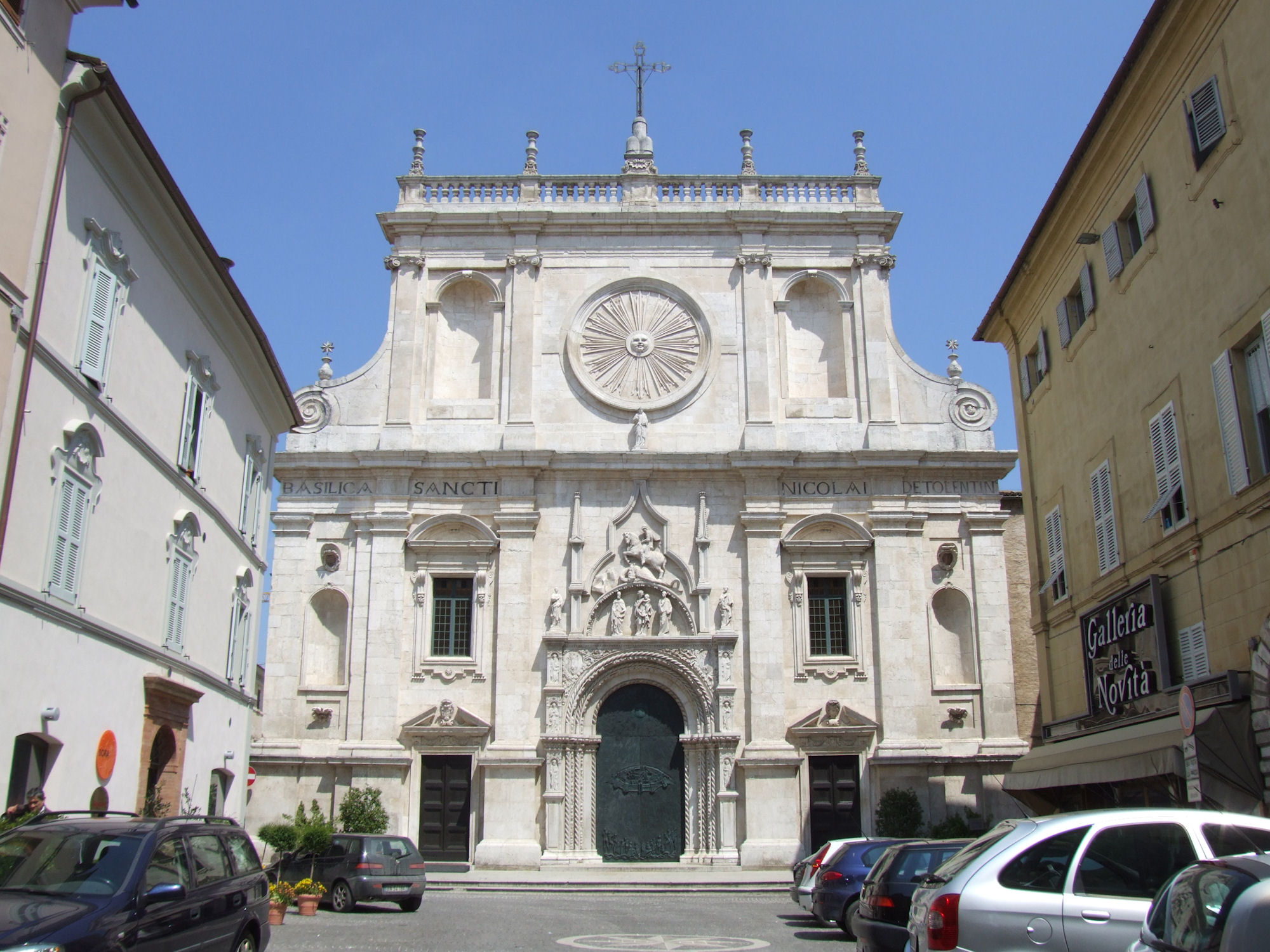
- Facade of the Basilica di San Nicola a Tolentino

Religion
- Affiliation: Roman Catholic
- Diocese: Marche
- Ecclesiastical or organisational status: Minor basilica

Location
- Location: Tolentino, Italy
- Interactive map of Basilica of Saint Nicholas of Tolentino; Basilica di San Nicola a Tolentino (in Italian)
- Coordinates: 43°12′28.5″N 13°17′5.9″E

Architecture
- Type: Church
- Style: Baroque

Website
- www.sannicoladatolentino.it

The Basilica of Saint Nicholas of Tolentino (Italian: Basilica di San Nicola a Tolentino) is a Roman Catholic church and minor basilica that is part of the Augustinian monastery in the hill-town of Tolentino, province of Macerata, Marche, central Italy. The church is a former cathedral of the Roman Catholic Diocese of Tolentino, suppressed in 1586.

Notably, it was the first minor basilica to be formally canonically created, by Pope Pius VI in the brief Supremus Ille in 1783. Prior to this, minor basilicas were created via immemorial custom.

It contains architecture and art from the 14th through to the 17th centuries. The imposing marble facade of the church was constructed over the centuries, and was completed in the 17th century. Burials include that of Saint Nicholas of Tolentino.

== Interior ==
=== Chapels ===
- Cappellone of San Nicola

The Cappellone di San Nicola is a Gothic chapel that opens to the cloister. The walls and ceiling are covered with early 14th-century Giottesque frescoes, attributed variously to the Master of Tolentino, the Master of the Magi of Fabriano, or Pietro da Rimini, depicting scenes from the Life of Saint Nicholas of Tolentino, the Life of the Virgin, and the Life of Christ. The spandrels of the chapel depict the four Evangelists and four Doctors of the church. The altar has a 15th-century polychrome stone statue of Saint Nicholas of Tolentino, attributed to Niccolò di Giovanni, atop a funerary monument. The saint's tomb lies in the crypt. The frescoes appear to have been completed within a few decades of the saint's death in 1305.

- Chapel of the Sante Braccia (Holy Arms)

This chapel was erected for the veneration of the relics of the saint's arms. It is entered through a 17th-century portal, which enters what was once the sacristy and leads to the 15th-century chapel, reconstructed in 1670 to accommodate more pilgrims. In 1819, the walls were decorated with polychrome marble in scagliola by Stefano da Morrovalle. In 1850 the ceiling was decorated with stars by Emidio Pallotta. In 1662, the dome had been decorated with a stuccowork depicting Paradise by Marco Antonio Baraciola, an artist from Como. The lateral walls have two large canvases: The Fire in the Ducal Palace of Venice by Matthias Stom and The Plague Affecting a Venetian city by Giovanni Carboncino. They were donated in the 17th century, and erected as allegories for the miraculous interventions of the saint. The walls are replete with ex voto donations. Six statues in stucco and bas reliefs beside the windows alluding to the Virtues of the saint are by Giambattista Latini da Mogliano, based on designs by Pallotta.

- Chapel of Saint Anne (Sant'Anna)

This chapel, the first on the right, originally commissioned by the Benadduci family, houses a main altarpiece of the Vision of the Virgin by Saint Anne by Guercino. The lateral wall on the left has a canvas depicting the Glory of Saint Lucy with two Augustinian Saints (1754) by Marcantonio Romoli, a pupil of Placido Costanzi and Sebastiano Conca. The right wall has a 17th-century Agony in the Garden.

- Chapel of the Sacro Cuore (Sacred Heart)

This chapel, the second on the right, has a main altarpiece depicting the Sacred Heart of Christ shown to Saint Margherita Maria Alacoque (1920) by Virgilio Monti. The wooden crucifix on the right is said to be that venerated by Saint Nicola himself. There is also a 17th-century canvas depicting the Madonna, Saint John Evangelist, and Magdalen at the foot of the Cross

- Chapel of the Beata Vergine del Buon Consiglio (Blessed Virgin of the Good Counsel)

This chapel, the third on the right, has a copy of the icon of this Marian veneration found at the Augustinian Sanctuary of Genazzano. This copy (1850) was completed by the Augustinian Giovanni Gerold and gilded by Tito Beccachiodi of Recanati. The walls were decorated with the Story of the Icon (1873) by Villebaldo Natali.

- Chapel of the Virgine della Pace (Virgin of Peace)

This chapel, the fourth on the right, has an altarpiece depicting this veneration, Madonna dell'Ulivo (1810) by Giuseppe Lucatelli. A late 18th-century painting on the right shows Saint Nicholas Releasing Souls from Purgatory. The altar holds the relics of the Roman martyr Lorenzina in a casket with a wax body.

- Chapel of St Thomas of Villanova

This chapel, the first on the left, has an altarpiece depicting The Charity of Saint Thomas (1663) by Giuseppe Ghezzi.

- Chapel of the Beata Vergine della Consolazione (Blessed Virgin of Consolation)

This chapel, the second on the left, was commissioned by the Confraternity of Cinturati (Pregnant). The altarpiece depicts the Madonna Pregnant between Saint Augustine and Saint Monica (1858) by Luigi Fontana, copied after a painting by Giovanni Gottardi in the church of Sant'Agostino in Rome.

- Chapel of Santa Rita

This chapel, the third on the left, has a main altarpiece depicting Santa Rita (1912) by Girolamo Capofierri, a pupil of Emidio Pallotta. The painting is a copy of the canvas by Giacinto Brandi in the church of Sant'Agostino in Rome.

- Chapel of the Madonna dei Miracoli

This chapel, the fourth on the left, has a main altarpiece depicting a Miracle of San Giovanni da San Facondo Reviving a Young Girl (1691) by Giovanni Anastasi.

=== Artwork in main church ===
The main altarpiece in the basilica is by Marchisiano di Giorgio (1518–1526).

Other paintings depict the Mystic Marriage of Saint Catherine of Alexandria with Saints Nicholas and Anthony of Padua by Simone de Magistris, the Apparition of the Madonna of Loreto to Saint Nicholas attributed to Antonio Francesco Peruzzini. A Saint Nicholas of Tolentino is attributed to Simone de Magistris. Other paintings are attributed to Guercino and Rossellino.
