= Sebastiano Panunzi =

Italian painter

Sebastiano Panunzi (Tolentino in the Province of Macerata, June 23, 1845 -1924), also called Sebastiano Pannasi, was an Italian painter, mainly working as a battle painter, often depicting cavalry movements.

He studied architecture in Naples, and but soon chose to become a painter. In 1883 at Rome he displayed Una rivista di Cavalleria; in 1884 at Turin, he depicted Una carica di bersaglieri; in the 1884 Promotrice of Florence, he displayed a canvas entitled Avanscoperta di cavalleria; and finally in 1887 at Venice and Bologna, Un nembo di cavalleria. In Naples, he displayed a A Squadron of Cavalry at Gallop (1883), Una ricognizione di Cavalleria (1886), Ambulanza (1887), and Alle grandi manovre (1891). He also painted watercolor and caricatures. After 1900, he emigrated to America, first to New York then to Philadelphia, where he became engineer for the American Bridge Company.
