= Teatro Nuovo (New York) =

American opera company

Teatro Nuovo is an American opera company and training institution specializing in the repertory and performance practice of bel canto opera. It was founded in 2017 by Will Crutchfield, who is currently its general and artistic director.

== History ==
Teatro Nuovo was founded in 2017 to continue the work of Bel Canto at Caramoor after Crutchfield and the Caramoor Summer Music Festival (where he was director of opera from 1997 to 2017) parted ways following his desire to expand the scope and offerings of the program.

=== Inaugural season ===
Teatro Nuovo presented its inaugural Bel Canto Festival in the Performing Arts Center at Purchase College in July and August 2018, performing Rossini's Tancredi, Mayr's Medea in Corinto, and a second version of Tancredi featuring the eight alternative pieces Rossini composed after the premiere, which the company called Tancredi rifatto [redone]. Like its predecessor, the program is accompanied by a multi-week training program for young singers, with a cohort of resident artists and studio artists led by a faculty that includes Crutchfield, Rachelle Jonck, Marguerite Krull, and Marco Nisticò. In its first season, several of the leading roles were sung by program members, joining guest soloists Jennifer Rowley, a Bel Canto at Caramoor alumna, Tamara Mumford, Amanda Woodbury, and Santiago Ballerini.

In contrast to the Caramoor seasons, which were accompanied by the festival's resident Orchestra of St. Luke's, Teatro Nuovo formed a new 48-member orchestra playing on period instruments, seated according to the layout used at the Teatro di San Carlo of Naples in 1816, and revived the historical practice of performing without a conductor. Instead, leadership was divided between the concertmaster (Jakob Lehmann) and keyboard player (Crutchfield for Tancredi, Jonathan Brandani for Medea). This procedure has the effect of making the orchestra "a participating and listening ensemble, rather than an instrument to be played upon by a conductor".

=== Second season ===
Teatro Nuovo expanded its offerings in its second season: Vincenzo Bellini's La straniera, Rossini's La gazza ladra, and a concert pairing Rossini's Stabat Mater with Gaetano Donizetti's Symphony in E minor. Performances in the second season again took place at the Performing Arts Center at Purchase College, but also within New York City at Jazz at Lincoln Center's Frederick P. Rose Hall and the Church of the Heavenly Rest. The critically acclaimed period-instrument orchestra returned for the second season. During the summer of 2019, Jakob Lehmann was named associate artistic director.

=== 2020 season ===
For 2020, Teatro Nuovo announced revivals of Rossini's Maometto secondo and Il vero omaggio along with the modern premiere of Donizetti's Miserere in G minor in its original Viennese version of 1843. Upon the nationwide shutdown of live performances due to the COVID-19 pandemic, Teatro Nuovo announced that its planned 2020 season would be carried over to the 2021 festival. On September 15, 2020, Teatro Nuovo released the first-ever complete recording of Nicola Vaccai’s Practical Method of Italian Singing, led by Will Crutchfield and featuring 22 singers including Santiago Ballerini, Lawrence Brownlee, Teresa Castillo, Junhan Choi, Georgia Jarman, Alisa Jordheim, Hannah Ludwig, Christine Lyons, Megan Marino, Dorian McCall, Madison Marie McIntosh, Angela Meade, Tamara Mumford, Lisette Oropesa, Daniel Mobbs, Jennifer Rowley, Nicholas Simpson, Michael Spyres, Derrek Stark, Alina Tamborini, Hans Tashjian, and Meigui Zhang.

== Critical reception ==
Critical reaction to the new venture emphasized the orchestral innovations. The critic of The Wall Street Journal wrote that "the effect was transformative", and the Financial Times headlined its review, "this is how it should be done".
