= Santissimo Crocifisso =

Santissimo Crocifisso may refer to the following Italian churches:

- Santissimo Crocifisso, Alcamo, Trapani, Sicily
- Santissimo Crocifisso, Barga, Tuscany
- Santissimo Crocifisso d'Ete, Mogliano, Macerata, Marche
- Santissimo Crocifisso, Todi, Perugia, Umbria
- Santissimo Crocifisso, Tolentino, Macerata, Marche
- Santissimo Crocifisso, Urbania, Marche
- Oratory of Santissimo Crocifisso, Rome
