= Teatro Nicola Vaccaj =

Performance venue in Tolentino, Italy

Coordinates: 43°12′32″N 13°17′10″E

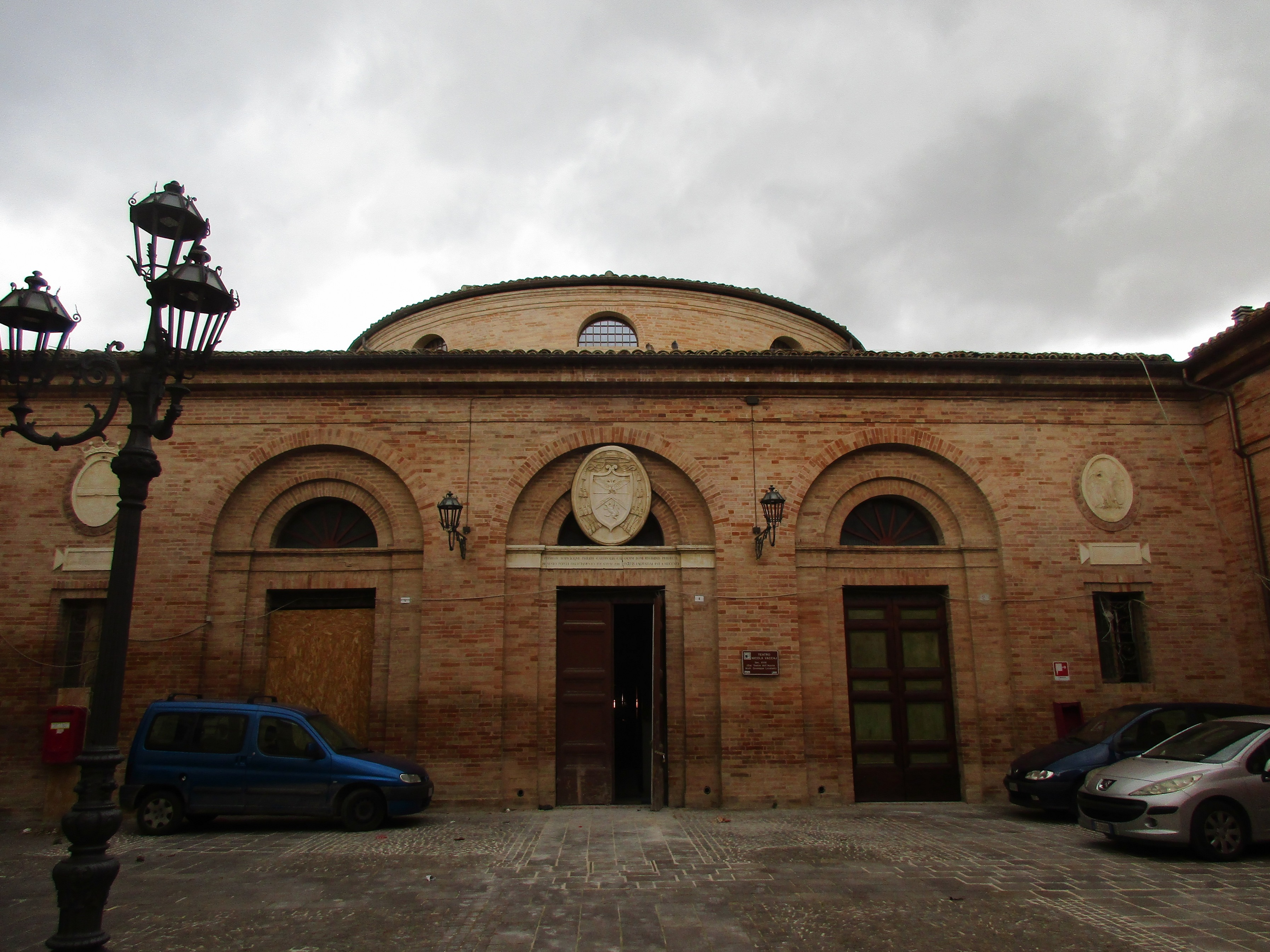
Façade, 2017

The Teatro Vaccaj or Vaccai is a historic opera house in Tolentino, Italy.

== History and description ==
This public theatre was built in the late 18th century, in part under the patronage of Cardinal Filippo Carandini. It was initially called the Teatro dell’Aquila, due to the eagle on the Cardinal's coat of arms. The theatre with its Neoclassical façade, was designed by Giuseppe Lucatelli and inaugurated on 10 September 1797. Napoleon had recently visited the town in his conquest of Italy. Lucatelli painted some of the panels and medallions from the alcoves surrounding the main seating. In 1881, the theatre was restored by Luigi Fontana, and rededicated to the native musician Nicola Vaccaj. The ceiling was frescoed to depict Apollo and the muses in Olympus. The former sipario or theatre curtain depicted illustrious persons from Tolentino, including Francesco Filelfo and Niccolò Mauruzi, burned during a fire in 2008. The present sipario is an 18th-century curtain by Fontana. In 1975, the theatre underwent a ten-year restoration. After the fire in 2008, another ten year refurbishment occurred.
