= Emidio Pallotta =

Italian painter

Emidio Pallotta (1803–1868) was an Italian painter and architect, active mainly in his native Tolentino in the region of Marche.

He studied in Rome under Tommaso Minardi, but returned to his native town to work under Giuseppe Lucatelli. He ran a school of drawing in Tolentino, and painted portraits of townspeople now kept in city hall. He frescoed in the Basilica di San Nicola a Tolentino. He designed the façade of the city Hall.
