= Angela Meade =

American opera singer

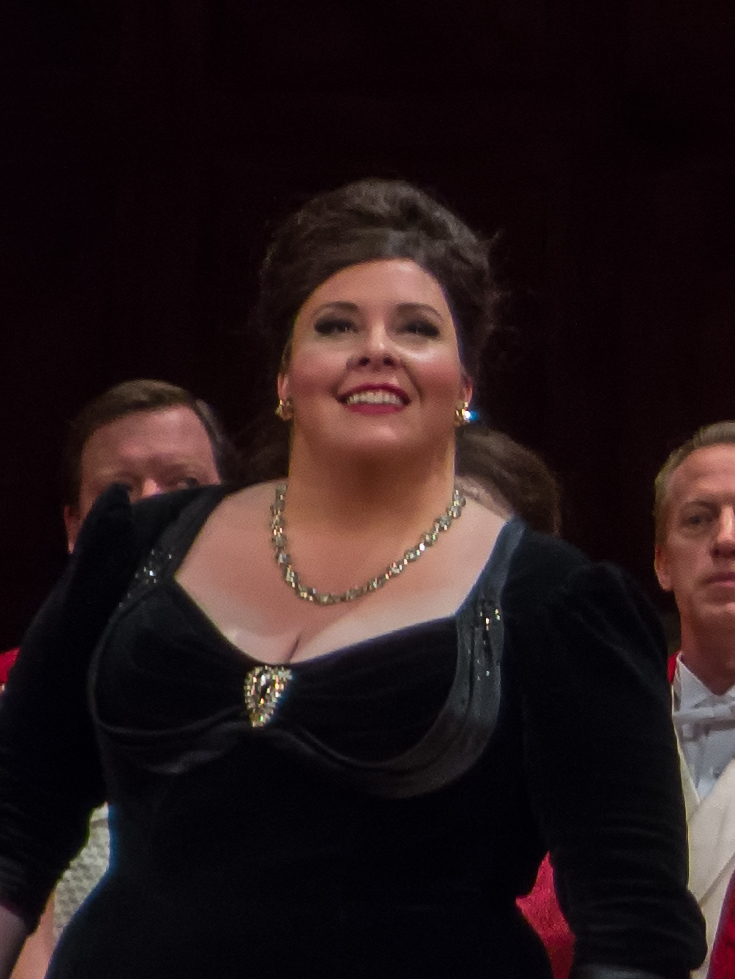
Angela Meade as Alice Ford in Falstaff at the Metropolitan Opera, 2013

Angela Meade (born 1977) is an American operatic soprano.

== Life and career ==
Born in Centralia, Washington, Meade earned a Bachelor of Music degree in Voice from Pacific Lutheran University and a Master of Music degree in Voice from the Thornton School of Music at the University of Southern California before pursuing further studies at the Academy of Vocal Arts in Philadelphia. She has won more than 50 vocal competitions, including the Metropolitan Opera National Council Auditions (2007) and the Grand Prize at the Montreal International Musical Competition (2009). In 2011 she was awarded the prestigious Richard Tucker Award and in 2012 she was the recipient of the Metropolitan Opera's Beverly Sills Artist Award.

Meade made her professional operatic debut at the Metropolitan Opera as Elvira in Verdi's Ernani in March 2008 stepping in for an ill colleague, a role she reprised with the company in February 2012, which was broadcast as part of the Met's Live in HD series and in March/April 2015. At the Met she has also performed the roles of the Countess in Mozart's Le Nozze di Figaro (2009) and the title roles in both Donizetti's Anna Bolena (2011) and Bellini's Norma (2013) as well as Leonora in Verdi's Il trovatore (2013 and 2016), and Alice in Verdi's Falstaff (2013/14), conducted by James Levine, which was broadcast as part of the Met's Live in HD series and was released on DVD by Decca. Other highlights include Elena in Verdi's I vespri siciliani with the Vienna State Opera (2012), Fidelia in Puccini's Edgar with Opera Frankfurt (2014), Lucrezia Contarini in Verdi's I due Foscari with Deutsche Oper Berlin (2012) and for her debut with Teatro Real Madrid (2016), Giselda in Verdi's I Lombardi with the Opera Orchestra of New York (2013), Leonora in Verdi's Il trovatore with Palacio de la Ópera A Coruña (2015) where she also performed the title role in Rossini's Ermione (2015) under the baton of Rossini conductor Alberto Zedda. She has sung Donna Anna in Mozart's Don Giovanni with Los Angeles Opera in 2012 under the baton of Plácido Domingo, Cincinnati Opera in 2013 and the Metropolitan Opera in 2017. She has been a part of the Caramoor International Music Festival in the title roles of Rossini's Semiramide (2009), Bellini's Norma (2010), Donizetti's Lucrezia Borgia (2014) as well as Hélène in Verdi's Les vêpres siciliennes (2013) and as Imogene in Bellini's Il pirata (2017) and performances of the title role in Mercadante's Virginia at the Wexford Festival Opera in 2010

For Meade's 2019–2020 season, she made a house and role debut as Aïda with Gran Teatre del Liceu in Barcelona; a role debut as Elisabetta in Don Carlo in a return to the Palacio de la Opera in Coruña, Spain; a house debut with Teatro di San Carlo in Naples, Italy in the title role of Rossini's notoriously difficult Ermione; a debut with the Ravinia Festival in Mahler's 8th Symphony under the baton of Marin Alsop; and a debut with the Rossini Opera Festival in Pesaro, Italy for both a recital in collaboration with pianist, Giulio Zappa and as part of their gala concert under the baton of Carlo Rizzi. In addition, she will return to ABAO Bilbao for the title role of Donizetti's Anna Bolena; and a return to Portland SummerFest for a concert of Verdi's greatest hits.

Meade's 2018–2019 season included a return to the Metropolitan Opera for her role debut as Margherita in Arrigo Boito's Mefistofele; her debut with Seattle opera as Leonora in Verdi's Il Trovatore; a return to Teatro de la Maestranza in Seville for Verdi's Il Trovatore and a return to Dallas Opera as Alice in Verdi's Falstaff. On the concert stage she returned to Palacio de la Opera in Coruña Spain for a special evening of arias; presented recitals both in Vancouver's Singer Behind the Song Recital Series and for the McCammon Foundation at Fort Worth Opera; as well as performances of Verdi's Requiem both with Yannick Nézet-Séguin and the Orchestre Métropolitan in honor of Jacqueline Desmarais and for her debut with the RTÉ National Symphony Orchestra in Dublin under the baton of Michele Mariotti.

Meade's 2017–2018 season included a return to Washington National Opera for her role debut in Handel's Alcina; back to back contracts at the Metropolitan Opera for the title roles of Bellini's Norma and Rossini's Semiramide (broadcast live in HD); a return to Teatro Regio di Torino for Giselda in Verdi's I Lombardi; a return to Frankfurt Opera in her role debut as Cilea's Adriana Lecouvreur as well as recitals with the Philadelphia Chamber Music Society and Performance Santa Fe, a concert with her husband and tenor, John Matthew Myers with the Allentown Symphony and Mahler's 8th Symphony with Yannick Nézet-Séguin for her debut with the Rotterdam Philharmonic.

== Discography ==
- 2007: Documentary with Jamie Barton, Amber Wagner, Michael Fabiano, Alek Shrader, Ryan Smith, Kiera Duffy, Dísella Làrusdóttir, Ryan McKinny, Nicholas Pallesen, Matthew Plenk; Marco Armiliato conducting Metropolitan Opera Orchestra and Chorus; Susan Froemke (director); released 2009 Decca
- 2013: Verdi, Falstaff (complete video recording) with Stephanie Blythe, Lisette Oropesa, Jennifer Johnson Cano, Ambrogio Maestri, Franco Vassallo, Paolo Fanale, Carlo Bosi, Keith Jameson, Christian Van Horn; James Levine conducting Metropolitan Opera Orchestra and Chorus; released 2015 Decca
- 2015: Donizetti, Le duc d'Albe (complete audio recording) with Michael Spyres, Laurent Naouri, Gianluca Buratto, David Stout, Trystan Llŷr Griffiths, Robin Tritschler, Dawid Kimberg; Sir Mark Elder conducting Hallé Orchestra and Opera Rara Chorus; released 2016 Opera Rara
- 2018: Verdi, I Lombardi Alla Prima Crociata (complete audio recording) with Francesco Meli, Alex Esposito, Giuseppe Gipali, Lavinia Bini, Antonio Di Matteo, Joshua Sanders, Giuseppe Capoferri, Alexandra Zabala; Michele Mariotti conducting Orchestra and Chorus of the Teatro Regio Torino; released 2018 Dynamic

== Repertory ==
Role	Opera	Composer	Location	Conductor
Norma	Norma	Bellini	Caramoor Music Festival Washington National Opera Metropolitan Opera (2011–12) Los Angeles Opera Teatro Real Madrid Metropolitan Opera (2017–18)	Will Crutchfield Daniele Rustioni Riccardo Frizza James Conlon Roberto Abbado Joseph Colaneri
Beatrice di Tenda	Beatrice di Tenda	Bellini	Collegiate Chorale	James Bagwell
Imogene	Il Pirata	Bellini	Caramoor Music Festival	Will Crutchfield
Margherita	Mefistofele	Boito	Metropolitan Opera	Carlo Rizzi/ Joseph Colaneri
Adriana Lecouvreur	Adriana Lecouvreur	Cilea	Oper Frankfurt	Steven Sloane
Anna Bolena	Anna Bolena	Donizetti	Academy of Vocal Arts Metropolitan Opera Teatro de la Maestranza Sevilla ABAO Bilbao (2019–20)	Christofer Macatsoris Marco Armiliato Maurizio Benini Giampaolo Bisanti
Maria Stuarda	Maria Stuarda	Donizetti	Astoria Music Festival	Keith Clark
Elisabetta	Roberto Devereux	Donizetti	Dallas Opera	Graeme Jenkins
Lucrezia Borgia	Lucrezia Borgia	Donizetti	Caramoor Music Festival	Will Crutchfield
Hélène d'Egmont	Le Duc d'Albe	Donizetti	Opera Rara (recording)	Sir Mark Elder
Lucia di Lammermoor	Lucia di Lammermoor	Donizetti	Academy of Vocal Arts	Christofer Macatsoris
Parisina d'Este	Parisina d'Este	Donizetti	Opera Orchestra of New York	Eve Queler
Alcina	Alcina	Handel	Washington National Opera	Jane Glover
Virginia	Virginia	Mercadante	Wexford Festival	Carlos Izcaray
Donna Anna	Don Giovanni	Mozart	Los Angeles Opera Cincinnati Opera Baltimore Symphony Metropolitan Opera	Plácido Domingo Roberto Minczuk Markus Stenz Plácido Domingo
Fiordiligi	Così fan tutte	Mozart	Academy of Vocal Arts	Christofer Macatsoris
Konstanze	Die Entführung aus dem Serail	Mozart	San Francisco Opera *	Cornelius Meister
Contessa Almaviva	Le Nozze di Figaro	Mozart	Metropolitan Opera	Fabio Luisi
Fidelia	Edgar	Puccini	Oper Frankfurt	Marc Soustrot
Ermione	Ermione	Rossini	Palacio de la Ópera A Coruña Russian National Symphony Opéra de Lyon Theatre des Champs-Élysées Teatro di San Carlo (2019–20)	Alberto Zedda Alberto Zedda Alberto Zedda Alberto Zedda Alessandro de Marchi
Armida	Armida	Rossini	Metropolitan Opera *	Riccardo Frizza
Mathilde	Guillaume Tell	Rossini	Teatro Regio di Torino Edinburgh Festival Stresa Festival Torino Tour of Chicago (Harris Theater), Ann Arbor MI, Toronto (Roy Thomson Hall) and Carnegie Hall	Gianandrea Noseda
Semiramide	Semiramide	Rossini	Caramoor Music Festival Metropolitan Opera	Will Crutchfield Maurizio Benini
Elvira	Ernani	Verdi	Metropolitan Opera	Roberto Abbado (2008) Marco Armiliato (2012) James Levine (2015)
Alice	Falstaff	Verdi	Metropolitan Opera Dallas Opera	James Levine Riccardo Frizza
Giselda	I Lombardi	Verdi	Opera Orchestra of New York Teatro Regio di Torino	Eve Queler Michele Mariotti
Lucrezia Contarini	I Due Foscari	Verdi	Deutsche Oper Berlin Teatro Real Madrid	Roberto Rizzi Brignoli Pablo Heras-Casado
Aïda	Aïda	Verdi	Gran Teatre del Liceu (2019–20)	Gustavo Gimeno
Desdemona	Otello	Verdi	Portland SummerFest	Keith Clark
Lina	Stiffelio	Verdi	ABAO Bilbao	Francesco Ivan Ciampa
Leonora	Il Trovatore	Verdi	Portland SummerFest (2010) Astoria Music Festival (2011) Peralada Music Festival Metropolitan Opera (2013) Metropolitan Opera (2016) Palacio de la Ópera A Coruña Deutsche Oper Berlin Astoria Music Festival (2016) Portland SummerFest (2016) Seattle Opera Teatro de la Maestranza Seville	Keith Clark Keith Clark Roberto Rizzi Brignoli Daniele Callegari Marco Armiliato Keri-Lynn Wilson Roberto Rizzi Brignoli Keith Clark Keith Clark Carlo Montanaro Pedro Halffter
Violetta	La Traviata	Verdi	Astoria Music Festival	Keith Clark
Elena	I Vespri Siciliani	Verdi	Wiener Staatsoper	Gianandrea Noseda
Hélène	Les Vêpres Siciliennes	Verdi	Caramoor Music Festival	Will Crutchfield
Agathe	Der Freischütz	Weber	Academy of Vocal Arts	Christofer Macatsoris

*cover
