= Castello della Rancia =

Coordinates: 43.2309°N 13.3558°E

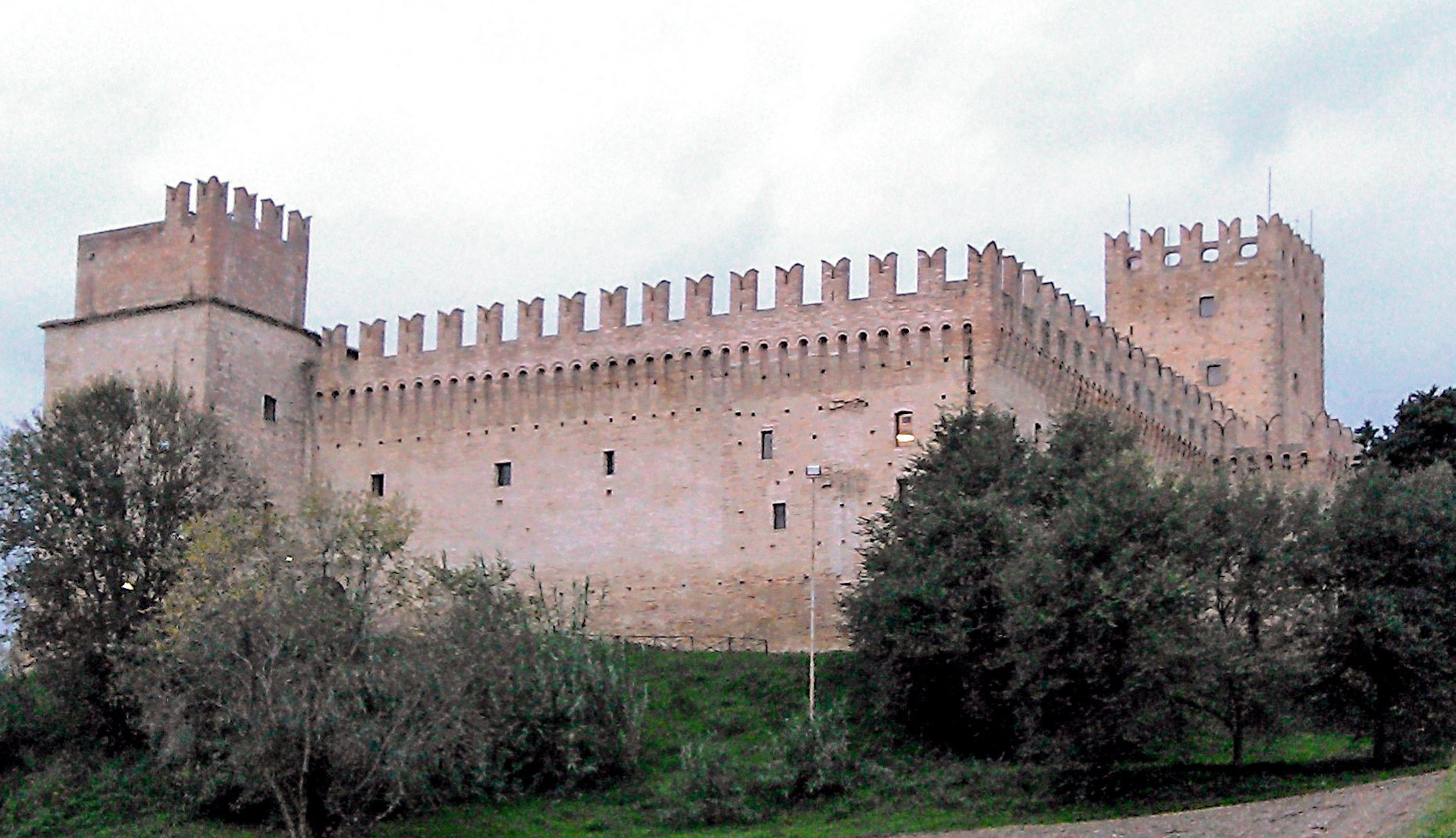
Rancia castle

Rancia Castle is a medieval castle, nearly 7 km from Tolentino in the province of Macerata, region of Marche, Italy. It remains relatively well preserved in the valley of the Chienti.

== Origin of the name ==
The Rancia Castle owes its name to the ancient granary, named “grancia” after the Latin “granica”, used by the Cistercian monks of the nearby Fiastra Abbey at the end of the 12th century.

== History ==
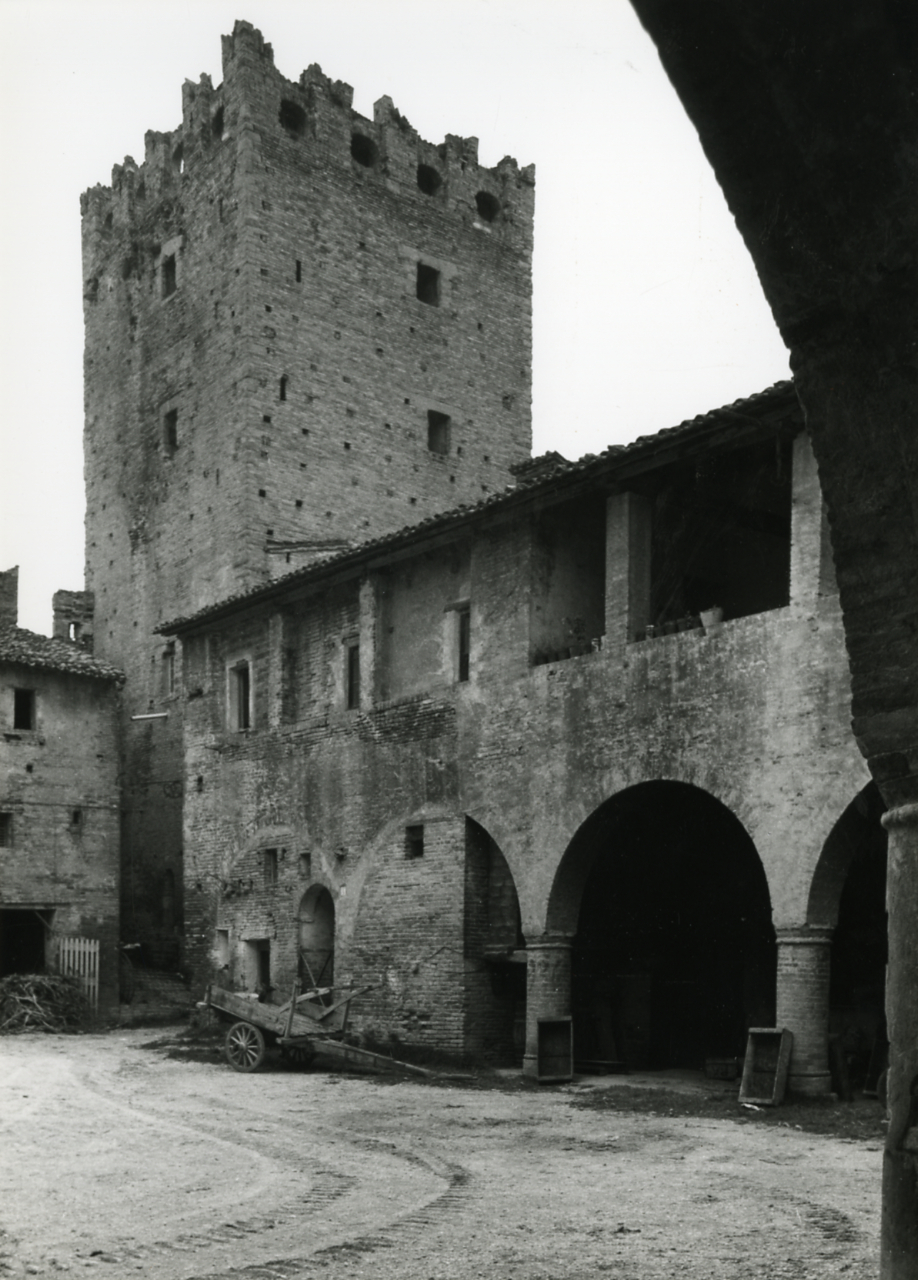
The courtyard photographed by Paolo Monti in 1969

A fortification at the site was present before the 13th century and used by the monks of the nearby Fiastra abbey.

In 1350, Rudolfo II, belonging to the family of Varano, the lords of Camerino, expelled the monks and created a fortification to defend the Chienti valley and control the Roman road that ran parallel to it. The architect Andrea Beltrami completed the castle in 1357.

By 1581, the Jesuits had taken possession of the Fiastra Abbey, and the Castle had lost its military importance, ministering to a large farm and as a hostel for pilgrims on their way to Rome.

In 1782 Pope Pius VI came to Tolentino and granted all the possessions of Fiastra Abbey, including the Castle, to the noble family Bandini. The last descendant, Maria Sofia Gravina di Ramacca, in 1974 gave the Castle to the Municipality of Tolentino, the present owner.

The castle was hotly contested during the Battle of Tolentino in 2 and 3 May 1815. Occurring at the end of the Napoleonic conflicts, the troops of Murat, King of Naples battled the Austrian troops aiming to restore the Bourbon rulers of Naples. The Austrians prevailed and Murat's forces were made to retreat. The Battle of Tolentino is now celebrated in commemoration named "Tolentino 1815", which takes place every year in the countryside surrounding the Rancia castle.

== Main architectural structure ==
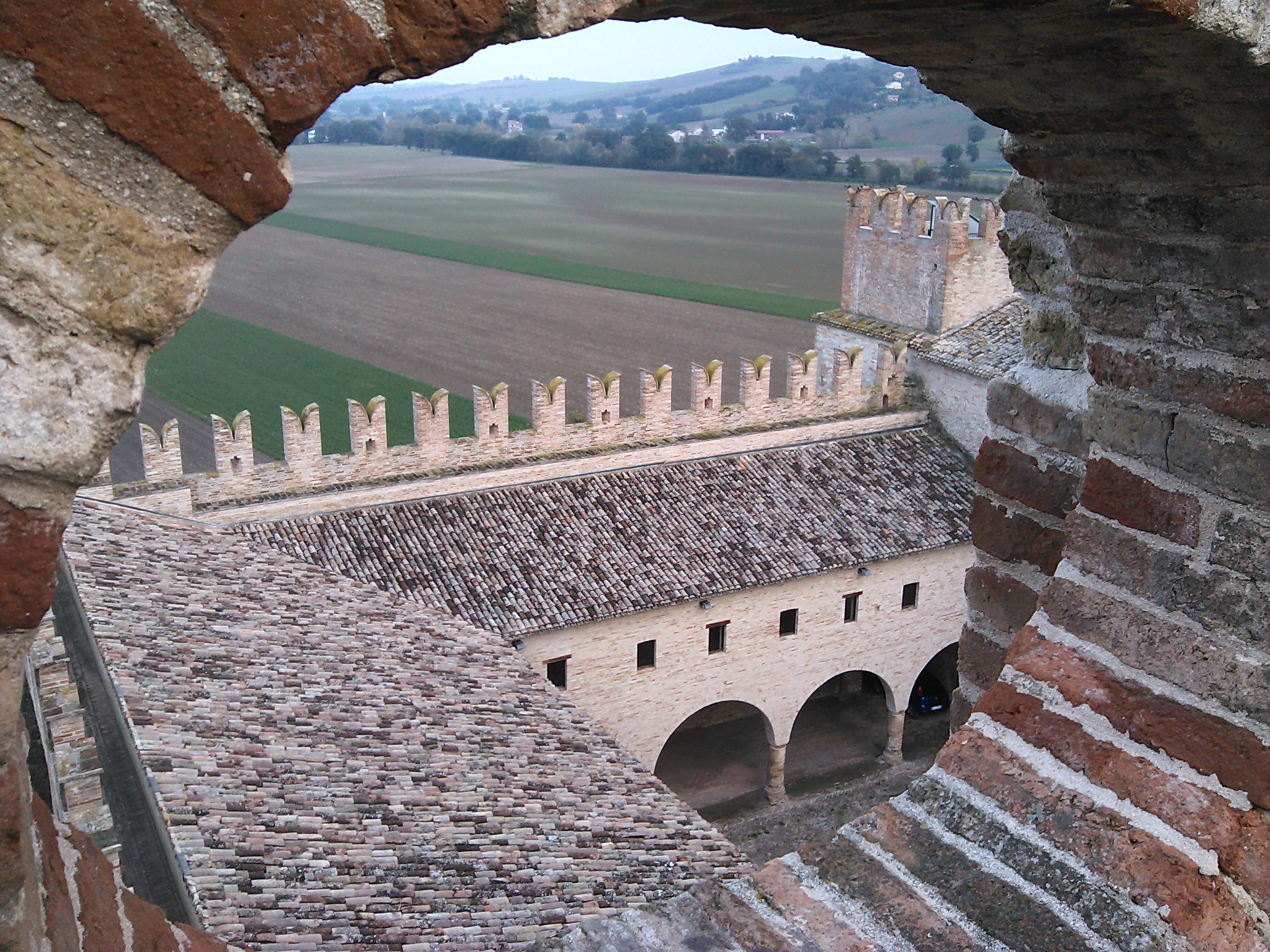
View of the castle from the main tower.

The building is square in shape, is composed of a crenellated walls strengthened by three towers. In defense of the main stands one of the towers that were accessed by a drawbridge, was later replaced by a brick bridge. The tower is about 30 meters tall and consists of four floors, of which the first three are cross vaulted. The basement of the tower, illuminated by two high slits at the base, was once used as a prison as evidenced by the large iron rings fixtures on the walls. On two adjacent sides of the court, provided at the center of a deep tank, rise two porches with arches supported by cylindrical pillars of brick. On the first floor another portico flanked by a large living room, probably the part of the castle that was used as a residence. The courtyard leads to a Baroque chapel built by the Jesuits.

Unconfirmed reports support the existence, in the center of the courtyard, another tank where it seems many of the dead were buried during the Battle of Rancia in 1815. According to legend only, there is a hidden tunnel that links castle to the Basilica of San Nicola in the town of Tolentino.

== External links and references ==
- Site tourism of Tolentino
- Site of castle in Italy
- Site of monument in Tolentino
