= Teatro Nuovo =

Teatro Nuovo can refer to the American opera company Teatro Nuovo (New York) or to any of the following theatres in Italy:

- Teatro Nuovo (Naples), an opera house and theatre in Naples
- Teatro Lirico Giuseppe Verdi, an opera house in Trieste, originally named Teatro Nuovo
- Teatro Donizetti, an opera house in Bergamo, originally named Teatro Nuovo
- Teatro Rossini (Pesaro), an opera house in Pesaro, originally named Teatro Nuovo
- Teatro Nuovo (Ferrara), Ferrara
- Teatro Nuovo (Firenze), Florence
- Teatro Nuovo (Firenze, via Bufalini), Florence (via Bufalini)
- Teatro Nuovo (Milan)
- Teatro Nuovo (Mirandola)
- Teatro Nuovo Montevergini, Palermo
- Teatro Nuovo (Padua), now Teatro Verdi
- Teatro Nuovo (Serravalle), Serravalle (San Marino)
- Teatro Nuovo "Gian Carlo Menotti", Spoleto
- Teatro Nuovo Giovanni da Udine, Udine
- Teatro Nuovo (Verona), Verona
