= Lucie Bigelow Rosen =

American musician

External images
- Portrait illustrated on theremin program cover
- Lucie Rosen playing the theremin, on Caramoor Center website

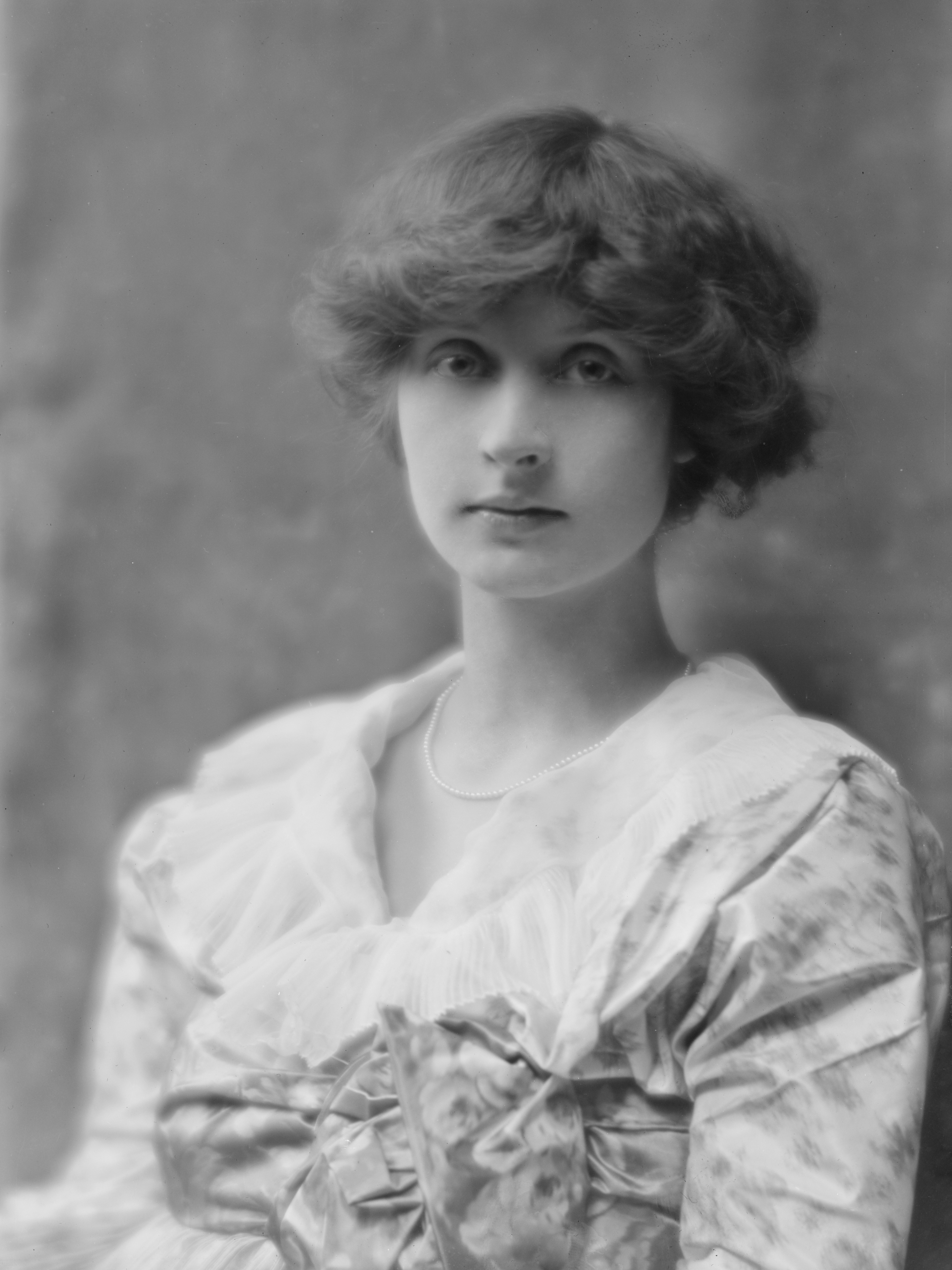
Lucie Bigelow Rosen, 1915

Lucie Bigelow Rosen (June 28, 1890 – November 27, 1968) was an American Theremin soloist known for popularizing the use of the instrument in the 1930s and 1940s, and a founder, along with her husband, Walter Tower Rosen, of the Caramoor festival.

Radio interview
Radio interview from 1935 of PHOHI with Lucie Rosen

== Life ==
Lucie Bigelow Dodge was born in Bernardsville, New Jersey in 1890, and married the lawyer and banker Walter Tower Rosen in 1914. They shared a common passion for art and culture, especially Italian, making frequent European trips and collecting works of art for their Caramoor estate that they developed from 1929 to 1939.

By 1930 Lucie was part of a ten-person theremin ensemble rehearsing for their debut at the Carnegie Hall with Leon Theremin. Sometime afterward, the Rosens offered Theremin the use of their 37 West Fifty-fourth Street townhouse at low rent. By 1938 Leon Theremin needed money to return to Russia and, according to the Rosen's daughter Anne Bigelow Stern, Walter offered him ten thousand dollars to create a new machine for Lucie together with all technical papers and rights to produce more for personal use only.

After Walter died in 1951, Lucie expanded the series of musical performances the couple hosted at Caramoor under the auspices of The Westchester Friends of Music and The Walter and Lucie Rosen Foundation into the Caramoor festival. She died in New York City in 1968.

== Family ==
Her parents were Flora Bigelow and Charles Stuart Dodge; they divorced in 1902. Flora was given custody of Lucie and her brother John Bigelow Dodge. She remarried to Lionel Guest, a cousin of Winston Churchill and moved to Canada and later to London. Lucie's paternal grandfather was Charles C. Dodge who was a brigadier-general during the American Civil War and had married Maria Theresa Schieffelin, daughter of Bradhurst Schieffelin. Her great-grandfather was William E. Dodge who helped found Phelps Dodge & Co and secured the family wealth. Her maternal grandparents were John Bigelow and Jane Tunis Poultney.

In 1913 Lucie disappeared from her mother's home in London, resulting in a much publicized search involving Scotland Yard. She was discovered six days later living in London's West End theatre district. She returned to her mother's home but soon after returned to New York, and married Walter Rosen in August, 1914. They had two children, Anne Bigelow Rosen and Walter Bigelow Rosen. Walter Bigelow Rosen was killed in a plane crash in England in 1944 following a bombing mission to Germany whilst serving with the Royal Canadian Air Force.
