= Virgilio Monti =

Italian painter

Virgilio Monti (1852–1942) was an Italian painter, active mainly in Rome, painting sacred subjects.

== Biography ==
Among his works are:

- Madonna and Child first chapel on right, Santa Brigida, Rome
- Holy Family, main altarpiece, Santa Chiara, Rome
- Archangel Gabriel (1875) first chapel on right, Santa Maria dell'Orto, Rome
- San Giuseppe (1878) first chapel on right, Santa Maria dell'Orto, Rome
- San Gioacchino ai Prati di Castello (1892), collaboration with Eugenio Cisterna
- Sant'Antonio M Zacaria (1900), San Carlo ai Catinari, Rome
- Sacred Heart of Jesus, Chapel of the Sacred Heart, Basilica di San Nicola da Tolentino, Tolentino
