= Graça =

Municipality in Ceará, Brazil

Coordinates: 4°02′45″S 40°45′10″W

- Municipality
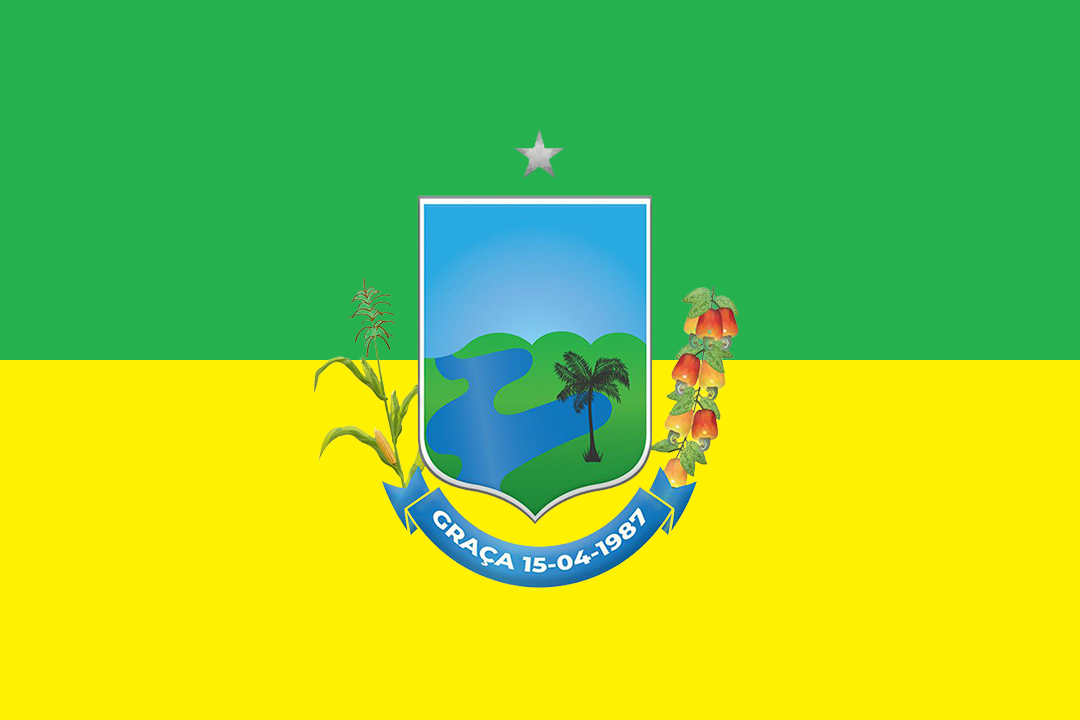
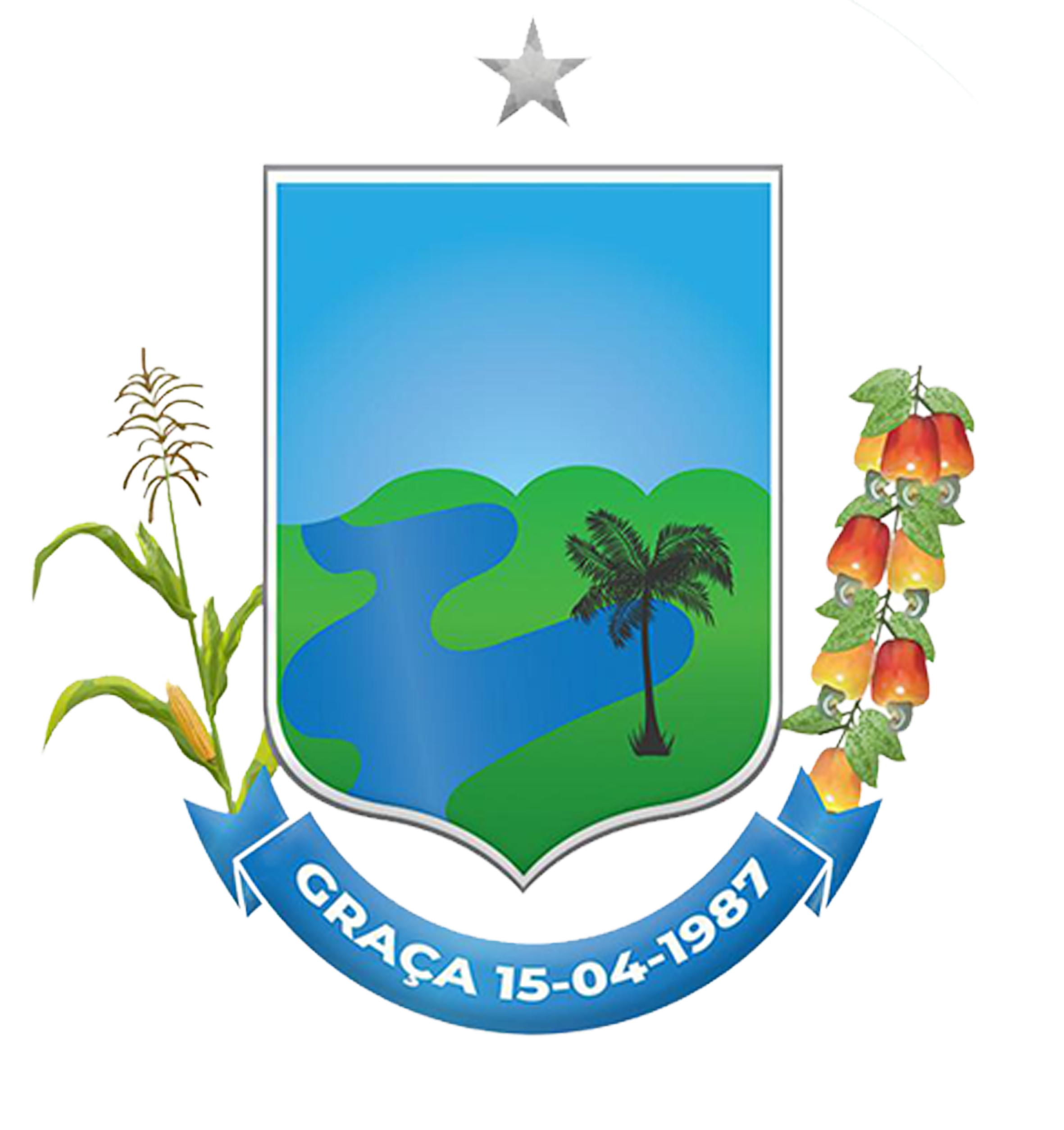
- Flag Coat of arms
- Interactive map of Graça
- Country: Brazil
- Region: Nordeste
- State: Ceará
- Mesoregion: Noroeste Cearense

Population (2020)
  - Total: 14,407
- Time zone: UTC−3 (BRT)

Graça is a municipality in the state of Ceará in the Northeast region of Brazil.

== See also ==
- Graça (name)
- List of municipalities in Ceará
