= Santa Maria della Tempesta, Tolentino =

Church building in Tolentino, Italy

Santa Maria della Tempesta is a Renaissance-style, Roman Catholic church located in Tolentino, province of Macerata, region of Marche in Italy.

== History ==
A church at the site was likely first erected atop an ancient Roman site. The church has undergone a number of reconstructions over the centuries. The main altar has a late 14th-century wooden icon of the Madonna della Tempesta. The church has two 14th-century frescoes, one depicting the Madonna and child with Saints by the Master of the Dormition of Terni, and the other a Madonna delle Grazie.
