= Santa Chiara, Rome =

Santa Chiara
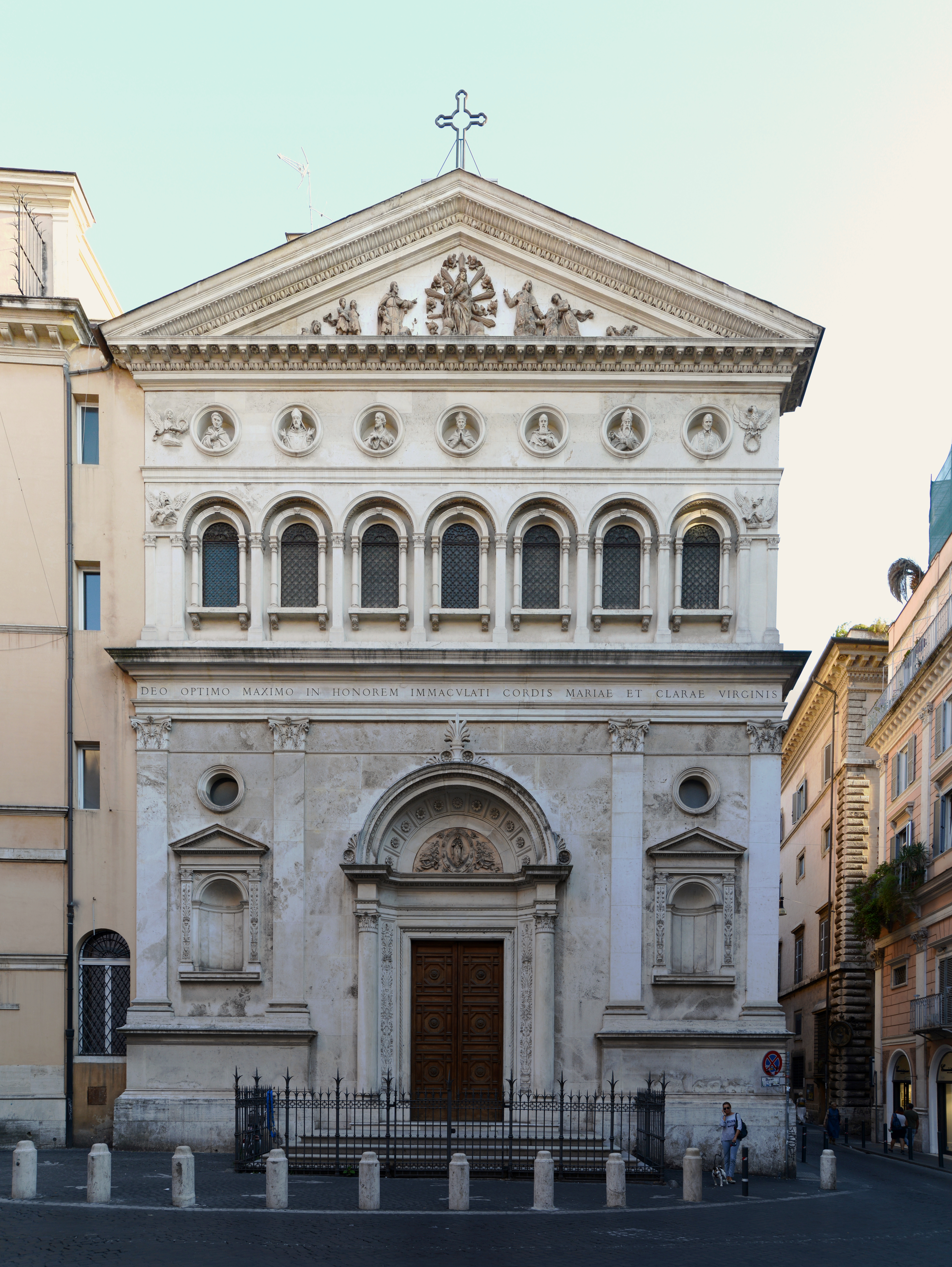
- The facade of Santa Chiara
- Click on the map for a fullscreen view
- 41°53′50.96″N 12°28′35.48″E
- Location: Rome
- Country: Italy
- Denomination: Roman Catholic

History
- Dedication: Clare of Assisi

Architecture
- Architect: Charles Borromeo
- Architectural type: Church

Santa Chiara is a church in the rione Pigna, formerly the Campus Martius area of Rome dedicated to Saint Clare of Assisi. It is located at the corner of via Santa Chiara and via di Torre Argentina (where this street becomes via della Rotonda). It is about a block south of the Pantheon, at the piazza Santa Chiara.

It was founded by Saint Charles Borromeo, who built a Franciscan convent (now used by the Pontifical French Seminary) and the church within the ruins of the Baths of Agrippa in 1592. It was restored in 1627, but at some later point the roof collapsed and it was abandoned.

In 1883, the Congregation of the Holy Spirit acquired the property, and rebuilt the church, giving it a new facade designed by Luca Carimini in 1888. On the lower of the two levels, the main door is framed by two columns holding a semicircular tympanum with a decorated lunette. To the sides are niches with triangular tympanums, surmounted by circular windows. On the upper level there are seven windows surmounted by busts of saints. Below the windows is the Latin inscription: "DEO OPTIMO MAXIMO IN HONOREM IMMACVLATI CORDIS MARIAE ET CLARAE VIRGINIS". The triangular tympanum crowning the façade has a relief by Domenico Bartolini.

Inside the church there is a single aisle. There are frescoes and paintings by the painter Virgilio Monti (1852-1942), the official painter to the Roman Church appointed by Pope Leo XIII.

The church is still served by the Congregation of the Holy Spirit. The high altar has an altarpiece depicting the Holy Family, by Virgilio Monti.
