= Santi Lorenzo e Biagio, Monte San Pietrangeli =

Church in Monte San Pietrangeli, Italy

Coordinates: 43.191387°N 13.581837°E

Santi Lorenzo e Biagio is a Neoclassical-style Roman Catholic collegiate church located at the eastern edge of the town of Monte San Pietrangeli, province of Fermo, in the region of Marche, Italy.

== History ==
The collegiata of San Lorenzo e Biagio was completed in 1859 using designs by Giuseppe Valadier. It was erected outside the city walls, and the road in front of the façade is flanked at the end by two large terracotta lions, in active poses, sculpted by Luigi Fontana. The church, made with brick, has a sober pronaos with Tuscan columns supporting a triangular tympanum. The layout is that of a Latin cross, with the nave separated from the aisles by Ionic columns. There is a dome at the crossing. The cupola was frescoed depicting the Glory of St Lawrence by Luigi Fontana, and the spandrels depict the Doctors of the Church: Saints Augustine, Ambrose, Gregory the Great, and Jerome.
