= San Francesco, Tolentino =

Church building in Tolentino, Italy

Coordinates: 43.209288°N 13.284161°E

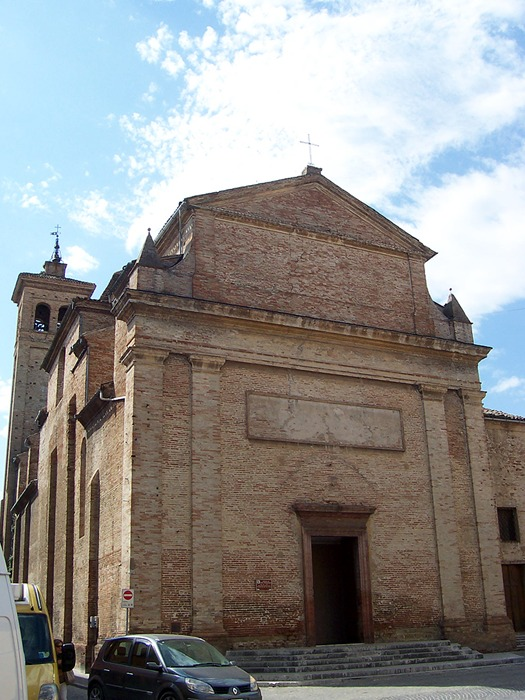
276TolentinoSFrancesco.JPG

San Francesco is a Romanesque-Gothic-style, Roman Catholic church located in Tolentino, province of Macerata, region of Marche.

== History ==
The church was erected in the 13th century. Some frescoes from this century remain; they appear to originate from Riminese artists. Among the frescoes moved here, a Madonna and child from the church of San Giacomo, Attributed to the Master of the Dormition of Terni.
