= Sacro Cuore di Gesù, Tolentino =

Church in Macerate province, Italy

Coordinates: 43°12′41.7″N 13°16′58.6″E

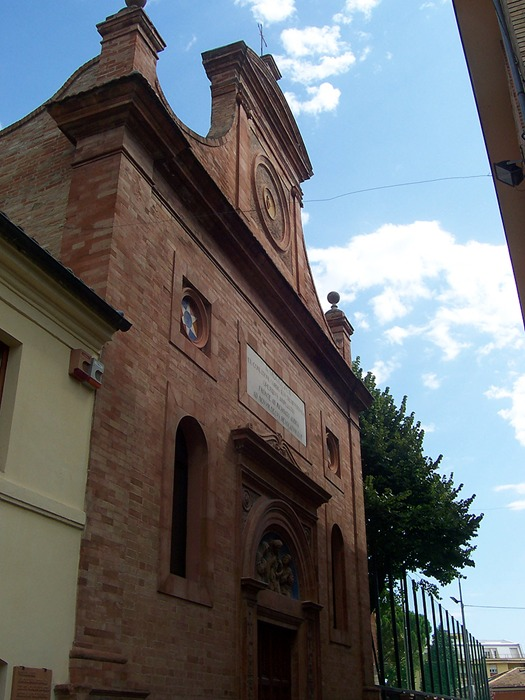

The Church of Sacro Cuore di Gesù (Church of the Holy Heart of Jesus) is a Roman Catholic church located in the town limits of Tolentino, province of Macerata, in the region of Marche, Italy.

== History ==
Formerly a monastic church known as San Benedetto da Norcia (Benedict of Nursia), the structure was consigned to the confraternity of the Sacro Cuore di Gesù in 1835; they enlarged and restored the church under the designs of the architect Luigi Fontana. The church was finally reconsecrated in 1880. The church was restored and reopened to cult in 2006.

The cult of the Holy Heart of Jesus was founded in the 18th century, inspired by the visions of St Maria Margherita Alacoque. In 1729, a confraternity was founded in Rome, aimed at works of piety. Domenico Spinucci (1777-1796), bishop of Tolentino, was intent on creating an altar for the veneration of the Sacro Cuore in every church of his diocese. In 1805, a confraternity, also known as the dei Sacconi, dedicated to this devotion was established in Tolentino. They instituted a ritual procession every Holy Friday, starting in the church of San Vito, similar to those held by medieval flagellants, dressed in sackcloth with hoods for anonymity. The confraternity was suppressed during 1808-1815.

The façade is made of brick with late-Baroque decoration. The interiors were frescoed by Fontana, who also painted the main altarpiece depicting The Apparition of the Holy Heart to Santa Maria Alacoque. In the right wall is a large canvas depicting Madonna between Saints Nicola and Benedetto (18th century) and on the left wall a canvas depicting Santa Giacinta Marescalchi by Gerolamo Capoferri.

Since 2017 the church has been enriched with a new pipe organ, built by the organ art of Maestro Alessandro Girotto. The organ built from scratch using high quality nineteenth-century phonic materials, dominates the small choir with about 850 sound pipes and 16 royal registers. Built with mechanical transmission in a very small space, a true masterpiece of engineering and acoustics. an authentic masterpiece and work of art.
