= Catervus =

Patron saint of Tolentino, Italy

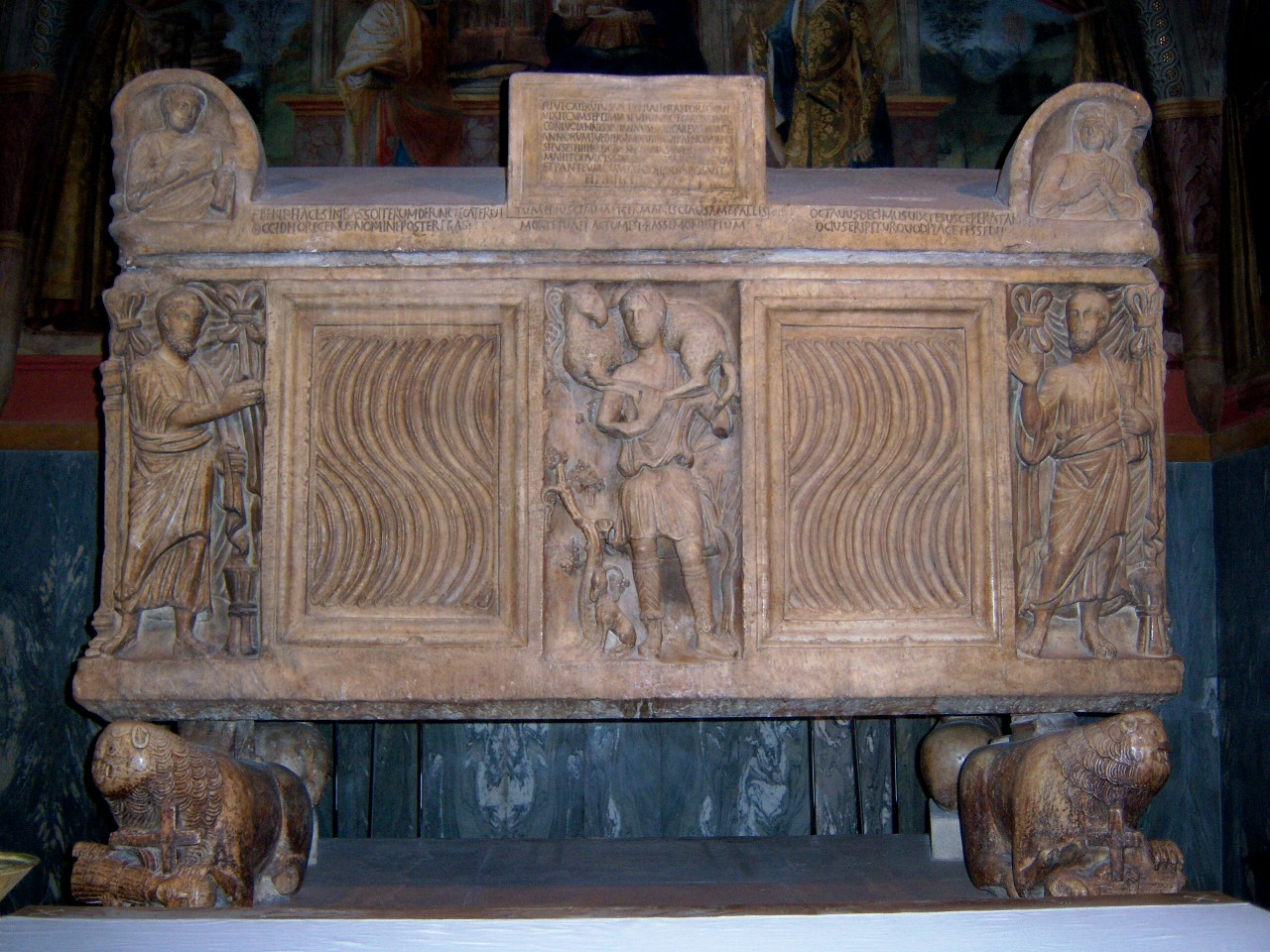
- Sarcophagus of F. Julius Catervus
- Died: 4th century?
- Feast: 17 October
- Patronage: Tolentino

Saint Catervus (Italian: San Caterv[i]o) (possibly 4th century) is the patron saint of Tolentino. Catervus is said to have brought the Christian faith to the city. Tolentino is known to have had bishops by the fifth century.

The Cathedral of San Catervo in Tolentino holds his relics, in his original fourth century marble sarcophagus, carved with representations of the Good Shepherd and the Adoration of the Magi. The cathedral seems to have been built on the site of the saint's Roman mausoleum. On the tabula of the sarcophagus, his full name is given as Flavius Julius Catervus. He seems to have been of noble, senatorial rank, rising to the rank of prefect. He died at the age of 56; his wife Septimia Severina had the sarcophagus constructed for both of them.

== Christian tradition and veneration ==
Catervus was martyred for bringing Christianity to Tolentino. When his sarcophagus was opened in 1455, his head was transferred to a reliquary for greater veneration. It is recorded that in 1567, his body was discovered, along with those of his wife and his son Basso (Bassus). Some two thousand coins were found in the sarcophagus.

His feast day is celebrated on October 17.
