= Giuseppe Lucatelli =

Italian painter and architect (1751–1828)

Giuseppe Lucatelli (1751-1828) was an Italian painter and architect, active in a Neoclassical style.

== Biography ==
Born in Mogliano to a father who was a medical doctor, he studied in Rome, in circles dominated by Sebastiano Conca and Anton Raphael Mengs. He returned to Tolentino, where he completed the decoration for the Nicola Vaccai Theater. These canvases are now collected in the Palazzo Comunale of Tolentino. They include a large canvas depicting Three Graces. He taught design at the schools of Macerata, Tolentino and Fermo. In 1803, the French-dominated government sent him to make copies of the Correggio frescoes in the formerly cloistered Monastery of San Paolo.

He painted an altarpiece depicting a Madonna dell'Ulivo (1810) for a chapel in the Basilica of San Nicola a Tolentino.
