= Rossellino =

Rossellino is an Italian surname, or nickname referring to red hair. Notable people with the surname, or in the case of the Gamberelli brothers, nickname, include:

- Bernardo Rossellino or Bernardo di Matteo del Borra Gamberelli (1409–1464), Italian sculptor and architect
- Antonio Rossellino or Antonio Gamberelli (1427–1479, younger brother of the last), Italian sculptor
