= Luigi Fontana =

Italian sculptor, painter and architect

Luigi Fontana (9 February 1827 – 27 December 1908) was an Italian sculptor, painter and architect.

== Biography ==
He was born at Monte San Pietrangeli in the Marche. He first began training between 1838 and 1841 at Macerata under Gaetano Ferri; then moved to Fermo to work under Gaetano Palmaroli, and finally went to Rome and joined the studio of Tommaso Minardi and attended classes at the Accademia di San Luca. Fontana's uncle of the same name was a prominent architect in the Marche region. Luigi Fontana, the painter, had two sons: Tommaso, who was his pupil, and Margherita.

Fontana painted religious subjects for the seminary of Fermo and the church of Santissimi Sacramento in Grottazzolina. In 1850, he returned to Rome to paint a canvas depicting Orazio Brancadoro sent by the Emperor Charles V to the Siege of Ratisbon. Among his other paintings is a Ezekiel's Vision for the church of San Nicola da Tolentino, a copy of the Crucifixion by Lorenzo Lotto found in the church of Santa Maria della Pietà in Telusiano, and another painting for San Martino e San Marco in Petriolo.

From 1879 to 1903, he collaborated with the ornamental painter Nicola Achilli (1858–1945) of Montegiorgio. Fontana completed the large terracotta lions outside the Collegiata di Santi Lorenzo and Biagio in Monte San Pietrangeli. Nicola also helped Fontana in designing and applying the faux marble decorations, and stucco decorations in the Cathedral designed by Luigi Poletti for Montalto Marche, in the collegiate church of Santa Lucia in Montefiore dell'Aso, in the church of SS. Sacramento e Rosario of Grottazzolina, in the vast abbey of Campofilone, in the Basilica di San Nicola a Tolentino, and other churches in the Marche.

Apart from his native town, his works are present in Rome in the basilicas of Santi Apostoli (1871–1875, apse frescoes), San Lorenzo in Damaso, San Giovanni in Laterano, Santa Maria Maggiore, Santa Maria sopra Minerva and other palaces, as well as in the cathedrals of Macerata, Montefiascone, and Tivoli.

He also sculpted a life-size, solid silver statue of Saint Philip of Agira in Zebbug, Malta. This is a unique 2-metre-high (6.6 ft) statue in classic style used for religious processional purposes with over 36 kg of solid silver. The statue was completed in 1863 and may be viewed at the Catholic parish church of the same town in Malta.
