= Sacro Cuore, Baragalla =

Roman Catholic church in Italy

Coordinates: 44.6736°N 10.6054°E

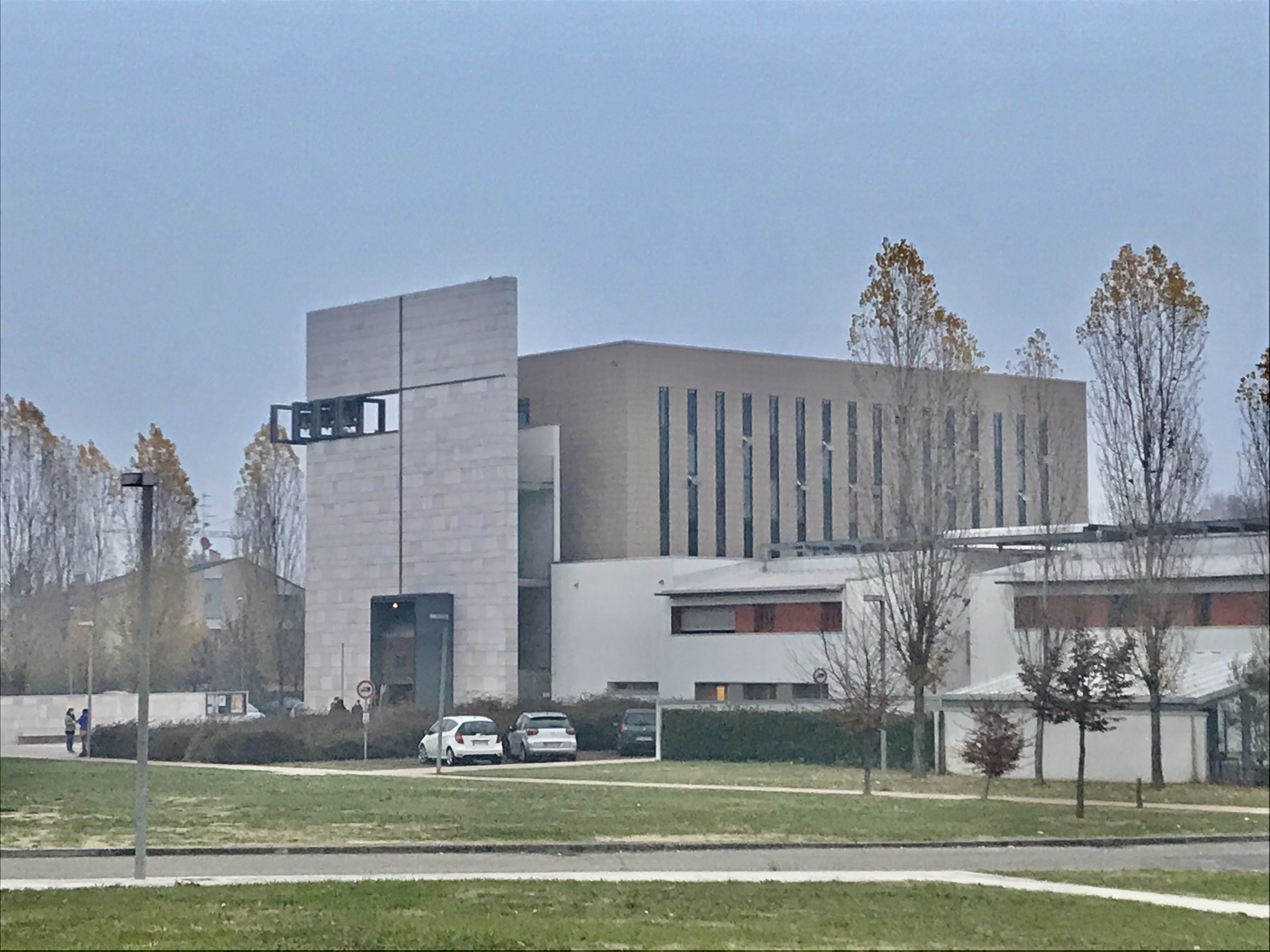
Facade, church and adjacent community center

Sacro Cuore di Gesú (Sacred Heart of Jesus) is a Modern, Roman Catholic church located on Via Monsignor Gilberto Baroni in the Baragalla suburb south of central Reggio Emilia, Italy.

== History ==
The site nearby at via Guittone d’Arezzo was initially occupied by a large Jesuit house. This building was inaugurated in 1958, and was occupied by the order until 1976. The chapel of the complex was used by the community as a parish church. Proving too small for the community, in 2010–2013, a new church and pastoral center was erected, designed by the architect Davide Raffin with Giulia Iseppi Perosa.

The bold facade is a curtain with distinctly tinted white rectangular marble blocks, and asymmetrically set elements of the portal and bells. The two story nave is rectangular and the walls are punctuated with slender vertical windows. The design won a prize in 2008 from CEI (Conferenza Episcopale Italiana) for designs of New Construction of Cult Buildings.
