= Santissimo Crocifisso, Tolentino =

Roman Catholic church in Marche, Italy

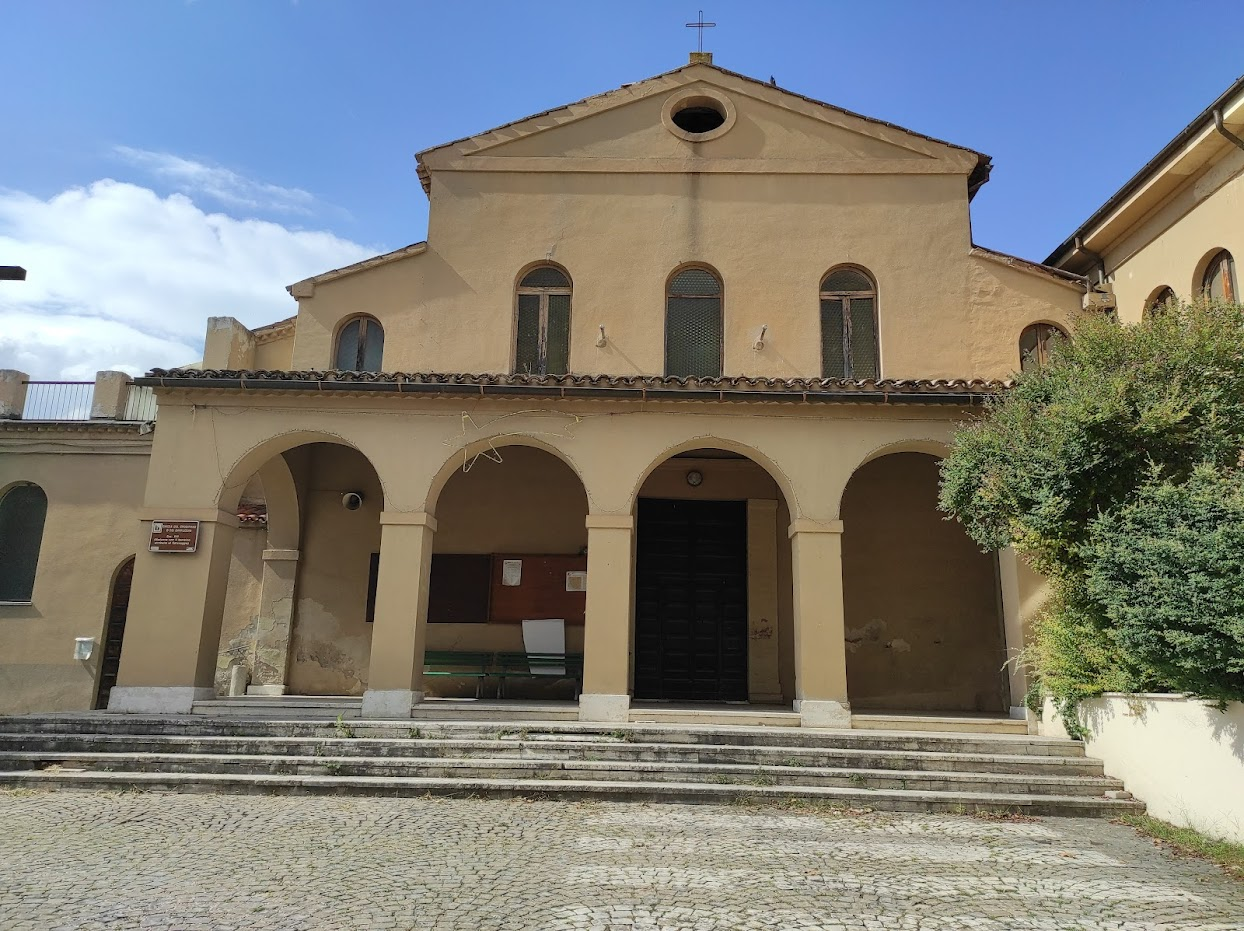
Church of the Most Holy Crucifix, called of the Capuchins for its origin

The Church of Santissimo Crocifisso is a Roman Catholic church located in the town limits of Tolentino, province of Macerata, in the region of Marche, Italy.

== History ==
The Capuchins had arrived in Tolentino around 1539, but began construction of this church only in 1589 under the patronage of Laura Zampeshchi, the widow of Alessandro Parisani, who donated the land for the church. The church was first consecrated in 1596 by the Capuchin order, under the titled of Santa Maria of Constantinopoli. Only in 1926 was the church rededicated to the Most Holy Crucifix.

The church has a single nave and three chapels only on one side. The main altar has a large wooden tabernacle carved by two monks in 1689. The church houses paintings depicting Christ in Gesthemane (16th-century) by an unknown Flemish artist; a Madonna and Child attributed to either Michelangelo Merisi da Caravaggio, or a follower.
