= Monte San Pietrangeli =

- Comune
- Comune di Monte San Pietrangeli
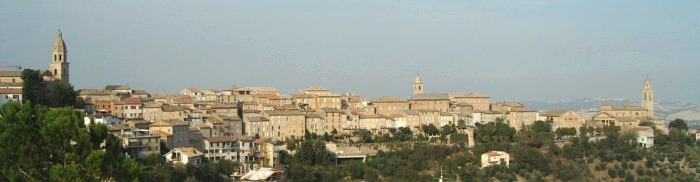

- Coat of arms

- Location within Italy Location within Marche
- Coordinates: 43°11′N 13°35′E
- Country: Italy
- Region: Marche
- Province: Fermo (FM)
- Frazioni: San Rustico

Government
  - Mayor: Paolo Casenove

Area
  - Total: 18.28 km^{2} (7.06 sq mi)
- Elevation: 241 m (791 ft)

Population (30 June 2011)
  - Total: 2,582
  - Density: 141.2/km^{2} (365.8/sq mi)
- Demonym: Monsampietrini
- Time zone: UTC+1 (CET)
  - Summer (DST): UTC+2 (CEST)
- Postal code: 63010
- Dialing code: 0734
- Patron saint: St. Blaise
- Saint day: February 3
- Website: Official website

Monte San Pietrangeli is a comune (municipality) in the Province of Fermo in the Italian region Marche, located about 50 kilometres (31 mi) south of Ancona and about 35 kilometres (22 mi) north of Ascoli Piceno.

Among its churches is the Neoclassical style church of Santi Lorenzo e Biagio.
