= Francesco da Tolentino =

Italian painter

Francesco Da Tolentino (active 1425 – 1435) was an Italian painter. Born in Tolentino, he likely left there as a young man for Umbria, then went on to paint in Naples and elsewhere in Campania and Apulia, including Agro Nolano, Melfi, and Serracapriola. He painted a triptych for the Cathedral at Melfi. His work shows the influence, if not the mentorship, of Pietro Paolo Agabiti and Antonio Solario.
