= Elisabetta =

Elisabetta is an Italian feminine given name related to Elizabeth.

- Elisabetta Artuso (born 1974), Italian former middle distance runner
- Elisabetta Barbato (1921–2014), Italian operatic soprano
- Elisabetta Casellati (born 1946), Italian politician and the first Italian woman president of the Italian Senate
- Elisabetta Dami (born 1958), Italian children's books author, creator of the character Geronimo Stilton
- Elisabetta de Gambarini (1730–1765), English composer, mezzo-soprano, organist, harpsichordist, pianist, orchestra conductor and painter
- Elisabetta Gardini (born 1956), Italian politician, TV presenter and actress
- Elisabetta Gonzaga (1471–1526), Italian noblewoman renowned for her cultured and virtuous life
- Elisabetta Grimani (died 1792), wife of the last Doge of Venice
- Elisabetta Keller (1891–1969), Swiss painter
- Elisabetta Querini (1628–1709), wife of the Doge of Venice by marriage
- Elisabetta Sanna (1788–1857), Italian Roman Catholic who was beatified
- Elisabetta di Sasso Ruffo (1886–1940), Russian aristocrat
- Elisabetta Sirani (1638–1665), Italian Baroque painter and printmaker
- Elisabetta Terabust (1946–2018), Italian ballerina and company director
- Elisabetta Trenta (born 1967), Italian politician who served as the Italian Minister of Defence
- Elisabetta Vendramini (1790–1860), Italian Roman Catholic nun who established the Franciscan Elizabethan Sisters
- Elisabetta Visconti (1374–1432), Duchess of Bavaria by marriage
