= Will Crutchfield =

American conductor, musicologist, and vocal coach

Will Crutchfield (born 1957) is an American conductor, musicologist, and vocal coach. He is the founding Artistic and General Director of Teatro Nuovo, a company that presented its inaugural season in the summer of 2018 at Lincoln Center's Frederick P. Rose Hall as the successor to the twenty years of opera at the Caramoor International Music Festival led by Crutchfield. He also has been a frequent guest conductor at the Polish National Opera and has led opera performances at the Canadian Opera Company, Washington National Opera, and Minnesota Opera. From 1999 through 2005, he served as music director of the Opera de Colombia in Bogotá. He was recently named one of Musical America's 2017 "Movers and Shapers," the publication's list of the top 30 industry professionals of the year.

== Life and career ==
Crutchfield was born in 1957 in Raleigh, North Carolina and spent most of his childhood in Newport News, Virginia, where he attended Hilton Elementary School and Warwick High School. As a youngster Crutchfield studied piano under Cary McMurran. In 1975, while still in high school, he signed on with the fledgling Virginia Opera, which had been organized the previous year in Norfolk. He graduated from Northwestern University with a B.A. in political science. His late father, the Rev. Dr. Robert S. Crutchfield of Newport News, Va., was a Presbyterian minister and also a professional operatic tenor.

A specialist in the bel canto repertoire, he prepared the first performing edition of Donizetti's Élisabeth ou la fille de l'exilé and conducted its world premiere at the Caramoor Festival on July 17, 2003. Crutchfield conducted Rossini's Ciro in Babilonia at the 2012 Rossini Opera Festival in Pesaro, marking the first collaboration between his Bel Canto at Caramoor program and the Rossini Opera Festival. He returned to the Rossini Opera Festival in 2014 to conduct Aureliano in Palmira in the world premiere of the critical edition of the score which he edited for Casa Ricordi. His performances and the subsequent recording of this work garnered the 2015 prize for best rediscovered work at the International Opera Awards. In the summer of 2016, he conducted Aureliano in Palmira in its North American premiere for the Bel Canto at Caramoor International Music Festival.

In 2014, Crutchfield was named a fellow of the John Simon Guggenheim Memorial Foundation. In addition to his scholarly work on vocal style, Crutchfield was the youngest music critic in the history of The New York Times, where he was a regular contributor from 1983 to 1989. He has also authored numerous reviews and articles for Opera News, including his Crutchfield at large series.

Since 2017 Crutchfield's activity has centered on Teatro Nuovo, where he has sought revival of period performing style in Italian opera in a way the Wall Street Journal described as "transformative". In 2019 the company presented Rossini's La gazza ladra and Stabat Mater, Bellini's La straniera, and Donizetti's Symphony in E Minor, with Crutchfield's reconstruction of the unfinished final movement. In March 2020, Opera Lafayette commissioned and performed his reconstruction, from Beethoven's sketches, of the original 1805 version of Florestan's aria in Fidelio (lost when the opera was shortened in 1806).

== Selected bibliography ==
- Will Crutchfield (1983), 'Vocal Ornamentation in Verdi: The Phonographic Evidence', 19th-Century Music, Vol. 7, No. 1 (Summer, 1983), pp. 3–54.
- Will Crutchfield (1989), 'The Prosodic Appoggiatura in the Music of Mozart and His Contemporaries', Journal of the American Musicological Society, Vol. 42, No. 2 (Summer, 1989), pp. 229–274.
- Will Crutchfield (1988) 'Fashion, Conviction and Performance Style in an Age of Revivals' in N. Kenyon (ed.), Authenticity and Early Music: A Symposium, Oxford University Press. ISBN 0198161530
- Will Crutchfield (2010), 'What is Tradition?', Marvin, Roberta Montemorra and Poriss, Hilary, eds.: Fashions and Legacies of Nineteenth-Century Italian Opera.. ISBN 0521889987
- Will Crutchfield (2012), 'Vocal Performance in the Nineteenth Century', Lawson, Colin and Stowell, Robin, eds: The Cambridge History of Musical Performance. ISBN 9781139025966
- Will Crutchfield (2013), 'G. B. Velluti e lo sviluppo della melodia romantica', Bollettino del centro Rossiniano di studi, Pesaro, pp. 9-84. ISSN 2280-918X
- Will Crutchfield (2017), Rossini: Aureliano in Palmira (critical edition). Fondazione Rossini, Pesaro (2019). ISBN 978-88-89947-65-4,ISMN 979-0-9001048-7-8
