= Giovanni Gottardi =

Italian painter

Giovanni Gottardi (Faenza, 27 December 1733 - Rome, 1812) was an Italian painter, mainly of religious subjects.

He was active mainly in Rome, where he was a member of the Congregazione dei Virtuosi of the Pantheon. Some of his paintings were completed by his colleague Christopher Unterberger. He painted Escape from Prison by St Peter for the church of Sant'Antonio Abate, Parma. He painted a Saints Augustine an Monica, and the Madonna of the Belt (1765) for the church of Sant'Agostino, Rome.
