= Caramoor Summer Music Festival =

Music festival in New York, USA

Coordinates: 41.242786°N 73.645968°W

- Genre: Classical music
- Frequency: Annual
- Locations: Caramoor Center for Music and the Arts Inc. Katonah, New York
- Inaugurated: 1945
- Website: www.caramoor.org

The Caramoor Summer Music Festival is a music festival founded in 1945 that is held on the 90-acre (360,000 m^{2}) estate of the Caramoor Center for Music and the Arts, which includes a Mediterranean-style stucco villa and is located about 50 miles (80 km) north of New York City in Katonah, New York.

The Caramoor estate became a centre for the arts and music following the World War II death of the son of its owners, Walter and Lucie Rosen. The couple donated the property in their son's memory, and it quickly became an established summer festival. Performances are given in the Spanish Courtyard of the house and in the 1,700-seat Venetian Theater, a tented facility on the grounds. The Music Room in the house is also used for year-round concerts.

For the past twenty years, the opera focus has been Bel Canto at Caramoor, with explorations of the bel canto repertoire under the direction of the conductor, Will Crutchfield. Semi-staged performances of such rarities (for the New York area) as Rossini's Otello and Donizetti's Elisabetta (the manuscript of which was discovered and then reconstructed by Crutchfield). Other innovative approaches to bel canto have resulted in 2005 productions of La sonnambula where the tenor's role was sung in the original keys and a La traviata where the majority of the standard cuts were restored.

The Caramoor Summer Music Festival also features a wide variety of music beyond Bel Canto Opera. Included are concerts by the Orchestra of St. Luke's, string quartets, various soloists, and a day-long jazz and roots festival. Caramoor also features a composer in residence, with such composers as John Musto (2006) and Paquito D'Rivera (2007) holding the post. The Orchestra of St Luke's is the orchestra in residence under conductor Donald Runnicles of the San Francisco Opera. Former music directors have included Julius Rudel, André Previn, and Michael Barrett.

== See also ==
- List of opera festivals
