= Emídio Graça =

Portuguese footballer

Personal information
- Full name: Emídio da Silva Graça
- Date of birth: 17 May 1931
- Place of birth: Portugal
- Position: Midfielder

Senior career*
Years	Team	Apps	(Gls)
1954–1959	Vitória Setúbal		

International career
1955–1958	Portugal	12	(0)
- * Club domestic league appearances and goals

Emídio da Silva Graça (17 May 1931 – 1992) was a former Portuguese footballer who played as midfielder.

== Football career ==
Graça gained 12 caps for Portugal and made his debut 4 May 1955 in Glasgow against Scotland, in a 0-3 defeat.
