= Caramoor Center for Music and the Arts =

Historic house in New York, United States

- Caramoor
- U.S. National Register of Historic Places
- U.S. Historic district
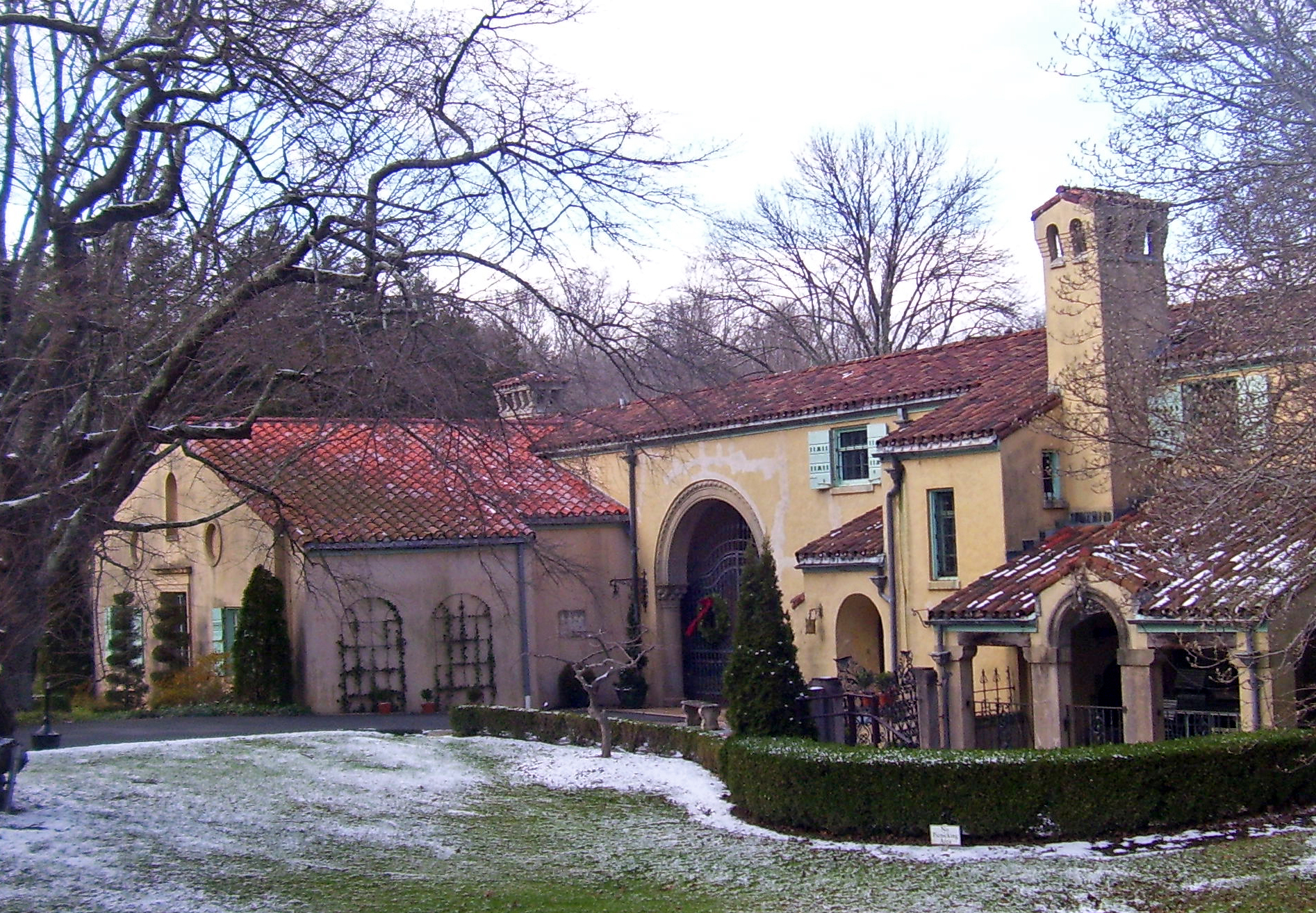
- East elevation of Rosen House, 2008

- Location within New York
- Location: Katonah, New York
- Nearest city: White Plains
- Coordinates: 41°14′20″N 73°38′49″W
- Area: 81 acres (33 ha)
- Built: 1929–39
- Architect: Christian Rosborg, Mott B. Schmidt
- Architectural style: Renaissance Revival
- NRHP reference No.: 01000548
- Added to NRHP: May 25, 2001

Caramoor Center for Music and the Arts is a former estate near Katonah, New York United States, approximately 50 miles (80 km) north of New York City. Today it serves as a live music venue for symphonic, opera, chamber, American roots, and jazz, performances. The estate and its historic home are legacies of their original owners, Walter and Lucie Rosen. The Caramoor Summer Music Festival is held there every summer. It also runs educational programs, and can be rented for events such as: weddings, pre and post-concert receptions, meetings and retreats, corporate and cultivation dinners, and photo and film shoots.

The Rosens built the estate and Tuscan-style villa gradually during the 1930s, importing many architectural and decorative items from Europe. The informal musical performances they hosted evolved into the beginning of Caramoor's current offerings in 1945, and their collection of Renaissance-era and Chinese artworks, some rare, is on display throughout the estate. Lucie Rosen later donated it to the private organization that runs it today. In 2001 it was listed on the National Register of Historic Places.

== Buildings and grounds ==
Caramoor is an 81-acre (33 ha) parcel on Girdle Ridge Road just east of the NY 22 state highway east of the hamlet of Katonah in the Town of Bedford. The area is primarily residential, with houses on similarly large lots amidst wooded, gently rolling terrain. The John Jay Homestead State Historic Site, a National Historic Landmark, is a short distance to the northwest along Route 22.

The Caramoor estate became a center for the arts and music following the death of the son of owners Walter and Lucie Rosen during World War II. In 1945, the couple created a foundation to support the property and musical programming in their son's memory, and it quickly became an established summer festival. There are 12 total contributing resources on the estate—seven buildings, one site, and four structures. An additional building, the Venetian Theater, was built after the estate became a performing arts center.

=== Rosen House ===
A curving driveway leads past stone entrance posts and through an electric entrance gate at a high deer fence through Caramoor's wooded perimeter into a central cleared area, dominated by the Rosen House on a slight rise to the south. A branch leads to other outbuildings.

The Rosen House is a stucco building rising two stories a poured concrete foundation with a red tiled roof in a variety of asymmetrical gable and hip configurations and irregular fenestration. A curving wall and arcade at the southwest corner connects to the former servants' quarters in that direction. A terrace with stone balustrade extends from the dining room on the east; another terrace is located off the master bedroom on the southeast. The caretaker's apartment, its small yard surrounded by a high wooden fence, is located at the southwest corner. A south wing, built after the Rosens' deaths to house rooms from their apartment in New York is non-contributing.

At the center is the Spanish Courtyard, surrounded by a cloister with 12th-century Byzantine columns, reached by a large stone arched entryway in the center of the south wall. The cloister, a one-story colonnaded open walkway, allows the courtyard's use as the primary entrance to the house. In the center is a large fountain; a clock is on the second story near the main gate. When used for musical performances during the festival, it seats approximately 300 people.

Rooms were historically accessed from the courtyard or narrow corridors along the exterior walls (now exclusively by the interior corridors). Most are finished in the style of the house, with stucco walls and coved ceilings. Much of the furniture and interior decoration, sometimes comprising entire rooms, was brought by the Rosens from England, France, Italy and Spain. The second floor, primarily bedroom spaces, is less extensively decorated and mostly original. The basement, under the kitchen wing, has storage space and a garage.

Among the rooms with notable furnishings and decor are the Burgundian Library. It has a vaulted blue ceiling painted with 13 Biblical scenes, and 65 other paintings on the doors and walls. The Lacquer Room has lacquered panels originally created for the Palazzo Riccasoli in Turin during the 18th century.

Chinese wallpaper made for the European market in the 18th century decorates the Formal Dining Room. Painted Chinese silk is mounted to the walls of the Monkey Bedroom. The collection contains one of the only two eight-fold Chinese jade folding screens in the world, a Qing Dynasty work depicting the Taoist Hills of Immortality in 40 panels with a gilded teak frame. Two red lacquered chairs and a mirror made by English cabinetmaker Giles Grendy for a Spanish castle are in the collection. More Chinese wallpaper is found in the Reception Room, with furniture from a Venetian dress shop. In Mrs. Rosen's bedroom is a gilded bed that once belonged to Cardinal Maffeo Barberini, later Pope Urban VIII.

The largest room, the Music Room, is located at the north end. It is 40 by 80 feet (12 by 24 m) with a 30-foot-high (9.1 m) ceiling. Originally the living room, the furniture has been relocated within the house and removable seating installed on movable risers. A large stage is located at the west end. It seats 172 and is used for music year-round. Its art includes a 16th-century Florentine cassapanca, an extensive collection of Urbino majolica, a Lucas Cranach the Elder painting and tin-enameled terra cotta reliefs from the studio of Andrea della Robbia.

=== Outbuildings and gardens ===
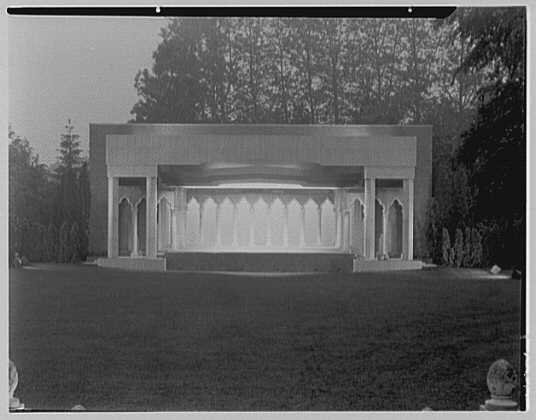
Venetian Theater

Attached to the Rosen House via a connecting wall is the servants' quarters. Architecturally similar, the two-story building has its own entrance to the courtyard, and serves today as the Caramoor administrative offices.

The second-largest building on the property is the Venetian Theater, along the main entrance drive. It was added in the late 1950s expressly as an additional music venue by enclosing a brick stage already in the garden with a colonnade. A large tent roof is in place seasonally to shelter the audience. There are accessible restrooms on the west end. It seats 1,546 and is the principal venue for musical performances.

Near it is the Sunken Garden, a holdover from the estate owner who preceded the Rosens. It was planted around 1912, making it the oldest native feature of the estate. It is enclosed by stucco walls on three sides, with stairs and intersecting walkways leading into its flower beds. The large planted "Medieval Mount" at the rear has built-in concrete benches.

The Venetian Circle on the east of the garden is framed by a pair of 17th-century Swiss gates. They are topped with Pegasus heads by the American sculptor Malvina Hoffman. Two paths lead to and through other gardens. From the Juliet Gate, manufactured in 17th-century Italy, the Cedar Walk leads 300-foot (91 m) path through the high eastern and western cedars of the Woodland Garden to the Italian Pavilion, formerly the viewing area for a nearby tennis court, now bricked over. The Butterfly Garden there, based on a Filippo Brunelleschi design, features plants that support all stages of butterfly development. Formerly a Cutting Garden stood just outside the greenhouse and Education Center, where Caramoor's horticultural staff cultivated cut flowers for planting. (This garden is no longer extant.) A longer wooded path leads through the Theater Garden's tall trees to a large Victorian urn.

A former dovecote, moved from the Spanish Courtyard to a location south of the house, has been converted into a fountain. It now serves as the center of the Sense Circle, designed to be enjoyed by the visually impaired. The fountain makes pleasant sounds, and the plants around it appeal to the other three senses, with some even being edible.

Other outbuildings around the property include a stable, two cottages, accompanying garages and a storage shed. All are contributing, dating to the 1930s, and are architecturally similar to the Rosen House. The landscaping is included in the Register listing as well.

== History ==
A native of Berlin, Germany, Walter Rosen emigrated to the United States with his parents in 1885, at the age of 10. He was well-educated, developing an early interest in music and art, and graduated from Harvard three years after entering it at a young age. Three years later, he became one of the founding partners of the law firm of Underwood, Van Vorst, Rosen and Hoyt. After another three years, in 1901, he left to join a client, the Ladenburg Thalmann investment bank. He remained there for the rest of his life. In 1914 he married Lucie Bigelow Dodge, a woman who had grown up in an affluent New York-New Jersey family and shared his passion for music and art. On vacations and business trips to Europe, they collected many of the artworks that are now at Caramoor.

They bought the property in 1928. John Hoyt, one of Walter Rosen's former law partners, knew they were looking for a country retreat and told them about his mother's estate, named Caramoor as a contraction of her name, Caroline Moore Hoyt. The Rosens visited and were greatly taken by the Sunken Garden and its cedars, meant to imitate the cypresses of Italy.

Originally, the Rosens intended to tear down all but the garden and build a Florentine-style palazzo. The Depression forced them to reconsider those plans, and instead they remodeled the "Farm Group" buildings on the site they had constructed in the first campaign of building (1929–1931) into the current estate (completed 1939), which at one point was 117 acres (47 ha). By 1939 that work was complete. Architect Christian Rosborg designed the house, closely supervised by the Rosens, whose townhouse on Manhattan's East Side had been redone in a French Renaissance style before they moved in. Interior design advice and assistance was provided by the firm of Powell & Playford (Arthur G. Powell and Richard Playford).

After the house was completed in 1939, they began hosting musical performances for their friends in the Music Room. Four years later, when their son Walter died in World War II while serving in the Royal Canadian Air Force, they decided to dedicate the remainder of their own lives to establishing Caramoor's musical legacy. They established the Walter and Lucie Rosen Foundation in 1946 and began hosting performances open to the public under the auspices of the Westchester Friends of Music, and later as an independent summer festival.

Seven years after Walter Rosen died in 1951, the performances had become so popular it became necessary to build the third venue, the Venetian Theater, near the Sunken Garden the Rosens had preserved from the prior estate. Owing to the work of the Rosens' daughter, Anne Bigelow Stern, the house was opened to public tours in 1970, two years after Lucie Rosen died. Architect Mott B. Schmidt designed a new wing in 1974 to house rooms from the Rosens' New York City apartment and expand the art collection on display.

The tent roof and floor were added to the Venetian Theater later to allow its use in inclement weather. The restroom wing was added later. The Sense Circle was created after the dovecote was moved to its following pigeon problems in the late 1980s. There have been few significant changes to the buildings and gardens other than those.

=== Lucie Rosen and her theremin ===
Caramoor founder Lucie Bigelow Rosen (1890–1968) was already an accomplished musician when she first heard the futuristic electronic musical instrument known as the theremin, calling it “a new sound in the world.” The theremin, named after its inventor, Soviet scientist and spy, Leon Theremin, captivated her attention and she became one of its earliest evangelists, performing throughout Europe and the United States. Walter and Lucie Rosen met Theremin at a soirée in 1929 in New York City and were impressed by the inventor and his ground-breaking instrument. Made from a wooden box with two metal antennae, it is played by the movement of hands through their electromagnetic fields without any physical contact.

The Rosens offered Professor Theremin the use of one of their brownstones on West 54th Street, New York, at a greatly reduced rent, as his studio and residence. Lucie Rosen set out to master the instrument, becoming one of Theremin's best pupils as well as his patron and advocate. Her first performance was as a member of Theremin's Carnegie Hall ensemble in 1930. By 1932, Lucie Rosen was performing frequently in New York as a soloist, but it wasn't until 1935 that she made her official New York debut with a recital at Town Hall. “Mrs. Rosen wove with eloquent hands the magical-seeing spell,” the New York World-Telegram wrote, “and the theremin responded to her summons with some of the most strictly musical sounds it has yet produced in our concert rooms.” The New York Times described how “the instrument got out of gear and its inventor, Leon Theremin, was called onto the stage to set it right ... Mrs. Rosen was in command of its resources all evening. She plays the theremin, not only with an awareness of its possibilities, but with a knowledge of music.” Reviews such as these were quite satisfying to Lucie, proving that the theremin was indeed a serious instrument and she was no dilettante.

That same year, Lucie Rosen gave a successful concert in London, deciding then to return the following year with a grand European tour. She played to enthusiastic reviews in Naples, Rome, Venice, Zurich, Munich, Budapest, Hamburg, Stockholm, Oslo, Copenhagen, Amsterdam, Brussels, Paris, and London. Lucie also continued performing in the United States giving numerous concerts in New York City and throughout the Northeast, again to rave reviews. “Lucie Rosen is one of the most original women in New York’s social world,” The New York Evening Journal observed. “She has a very curly blond hair which fuzzes out into a wide halo around her delicate and ethereal face ... her robe de style evening gowns are said to be designed by Mr. Rosen”(February 3, 1936). By late 1938, Walter Rosen was reconsidering his support for Leon Theremin. The inventor had a significant amount of unpaid taxes, the FBI was monitoring him, and his personal life was in shambles. He was also seriously behind in his rent payments. Later that year Mr. Rosen, in his typically gentlemanly tone, wrote Theremin a letter demanding he vacate the brownstone.

“... With all the good will in the world, it is impossible ... to permit you or the Teletouch Corporation to occupy number 37 West 54th Street. ... I ask you to be good enough to leave everything ... that belongs to Mrs. Rosen or myself.”

Just before Leon Theremin fled the country, he completed a new instrument for Lucie Rosen. She named it the September Theremin and it remains the most powerful and technologically advanced instrument ever built by Theremin. The September Theremin is on display at Caramoor's Rosen House, alongside a Moog Music Etherwave Theremin. Lucie made absolutely certain she knew every detail of the instrument, each placement of tube and wire, so that she could tune and repair the instrument as she believed she would never see Professor Theremin again. Her detailed “Theremin Notebook” contains schematics, specifications, and RCA part numbers for replacement tubes. Many of these spare parts are still stored at the Rosen House.

During the 1930s and beyond, the theremin was becoming very popular in the United States and Europe. Lucie continued to maintain a very active performing schedule here and abroad. While other theremin performers preferred to play classical music, Lucie encouraged composers to write music specifically for the theremin and she commissioned many works by such composers as Edward Mates, Ricardo Valente, Jenö Szanto, Jenö Takács, Mortimer Browning, John Haussermann, and Bohuslav Martinü. Much of this original material is in the archives at Caramoor Center for Music and the Arts.

In April 1950 the Rosens traveled to Europe for Lucie Rosen's third and last European tour, (her second tour took place in 1939) again crisscrossing the continent with performances in London, Amsterdam, the Hague, Zurich, Geneva, Rome, and Vienna. Her last concert took place in 1953 in Celina, Ohio. After his release from the Soviet camps, Theremin briefly took a teaching position at a music conservatory, but was soon expelled by the authorities. He contacted Lucie several times before her death in 1968, wishing to visit with her once more and show her his newest inventions, but no meetings took place. When her beloved Walter died in 1951, Lucie dedicated herself to the Caramoor Music Festival, determined to see it grow and thrive. Caramoor remains a destination for theremin scholars, historians, and artists who find the archives of Lucie's correspondence and original scores to be a valuable and comprehensive resource for their research.

== Programs ==
Caramoor's offerings are primarily classical (the Orchestra of St. Luke's has been in residence there since 1979) and operatic. During the Caramoor Summer Music Festival, on Thursdays through Sundays from June to August, jazz, bluegrass and popular artists have performed as well. Concerts continue year-round presented in the Music Room. In 2005 the festival staged Joseph Schillinger's "First Airphonic Suite", with Lydia Kavina, great-niece of theremin inventor Leon Theremin, as the soloist on that instrument (Lucie Rosen, an enthusiast of the theremin, was an accomplished performer on it herself, and she and her husband were for a time Theremin's patrons. The center's collection includes some of her instruments, including a highly advanced one Theremin gave her shortly before leaving the U.S. in 1938).

Caramoor also has extensive educational programs. Since 1986, an average of 5,000 students have in some way been involved through these education efforts. They range from programs for schoolchildren that, in addition to music, introduce them to Renaissance culture and Chinese art. Programs for musicians include mentoring from distinguished artists and the Ernst Stiefel String Quartet-in-Residence.

Picnic lunches are available for visitors who wish to wander the grounds before a performance. The facilities can be rented out for events such as corporate retreats and photo shoots; weddings are a particularly popular use, with The Knot having chosen Caramoor as one of its favorite places for the ceremony and reception.

== See also ==
- National Register of Historic Places listings in northern Westchester County, New York
