= Tolentino =

Tolentino Tulindì
- Comune
- Comune di Tolentino
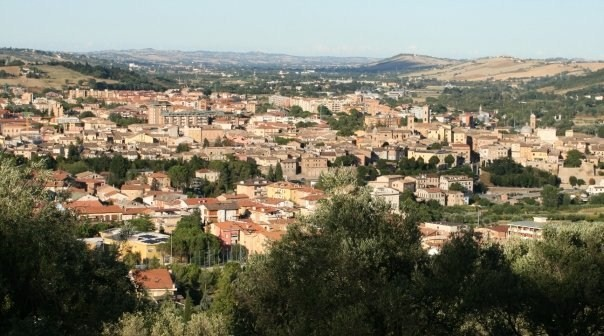

- Coat of arms

- Tolentino within the Province of Macerata

- Location within Italy Location within Marche
- Coordinates: 43°13′N 13°23′E
- Country: Italy
- Region: Marche
- Province: Macerata (MC)
- Frazioni: see list

Government
  - Mayor: Mauro Sclavi (Civic list)

Area
  - Total: 94.86 km^{2} (36.63 sq mi)
- Elevation: 256 m (840 ft)

Population (31 December 2019)
  - Total: 18,858
  - Density: 198.8/km^{2} (514.9/sq mi)
- Demonym: Tolentinati
- Time zone: UTC+1 (CET)
  - Summer (DST): UTC+2 (CEST)
- Postal code: 62029
- Dialing code: 0733
- Patron saint: St. Catervus
- Saint day: October 17
- Website: Official website

Tolentino (Maceratese: Tulindì) is a town and comune of about 19,000 inhabitants, in the province of Macerata in the Marche region of central Italy.

It is located in the middle of the valley of the Chienti.

== History ==
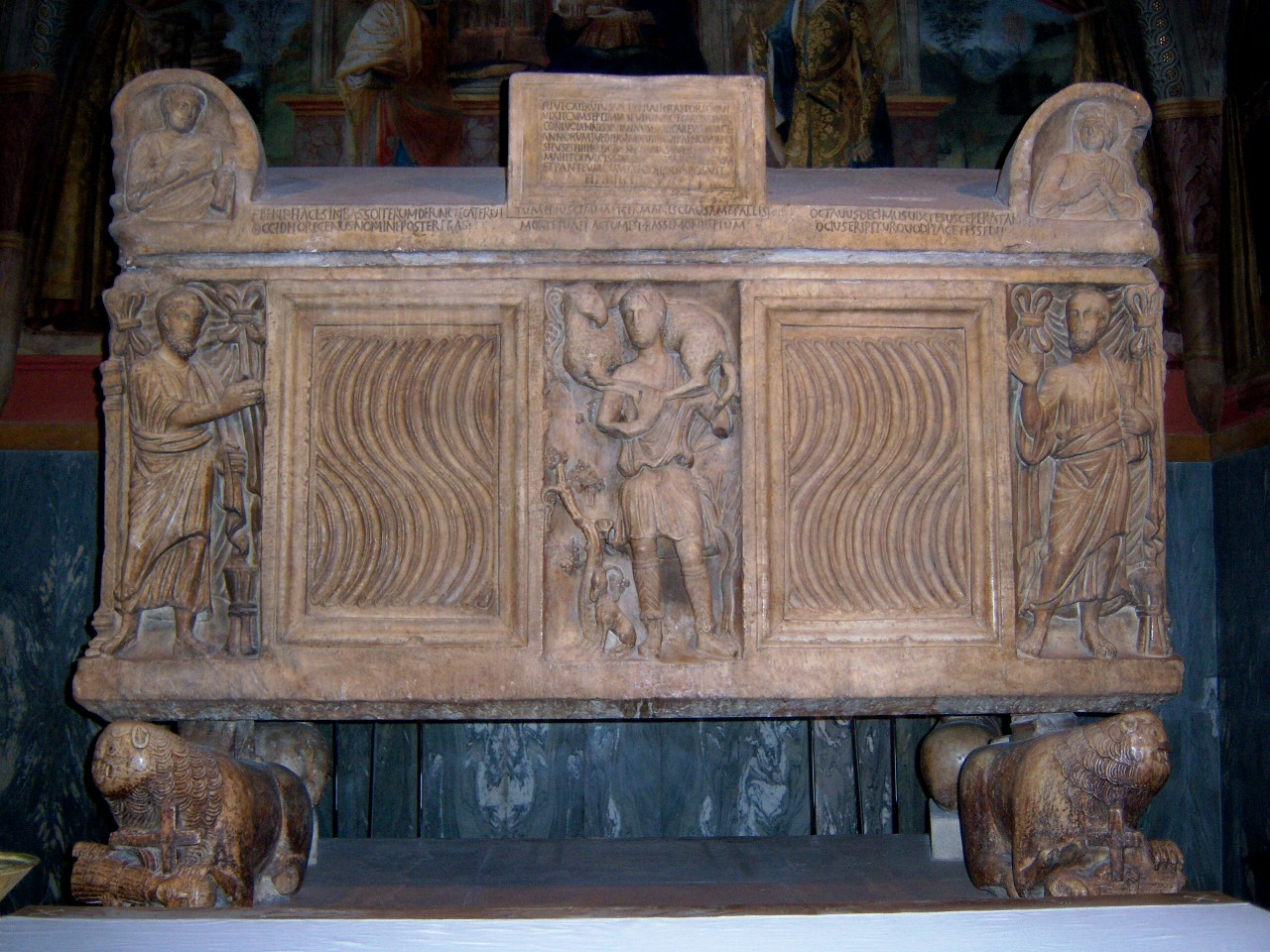
Roman sarcophagus in San Catervo

Signs of the first inhabitants of this favorable and fertile coastal zone, between the mountains and the Adriatic, date to the Lower Paleolithic.

Numerous tombs, from the 8th to the 4th centuries BCE, attest to the presence of the culture of the Piceni at the site of today's city, Roman Tolentinum, linked to Rome by the via Flaminia. Tolentinum was the seat of the diocese of Tolentino from the late 6th century, under the patronage of the local Saint Catervo. The urban commune is attested from 1099, assuming its mature communal form between 1170 and 1190, settling its boundaries through friction with neighboring communes like S. Severino and Camerino. From the end of the 14th century, the commune passed into the hands of the da Varano family and then the Sforza, before becoming part of the Papal States until the arrival of Napoleon.

The Treaty of Tolentino between Bonaparte and Pope Pius VI was signed in the city on 19 February 1797: this imposed territorial and economic strictures on the Papacy.

In 1815, at the battle of Tolentino, Joachim Murat was decisively defeated by Frederick Bianchi at the head of Austrian forces, resulting in his abdication. Tolentino returned to papal control until Italian unification in 1861.

In the late 19th century industrial development decisively linked Tolentino economically to the rest of Italy.

== Geography ==
The municipality borders with Belforte del Chienti, Camporotondo di Fiastrone, Colmurano, Corridonia, Macerata, Petriolo, Pollenza, San Ginesio, San Severino Marche, Serrapetrona, Treia and Urbisaglia.

=== Frazioni ===
Tolentino counts the hamlets (frazioni) of Abbadia di Fiastra, Acquasalata, Ancaiano, Asinina, Bura, Calcavenaccio, Casa di Cristo, Casone, Cisterna, Collina, Colmaggiore, Divina Pastora, Fontajello, Fontebigoncio, Grazie, Maestà, Massaccio, Pace, Parruccia, Paterno, Pianarucci, Pianciano, Pianibianchi, Portanova, Rambona, Rancia, Regnano, Ributino, Riolante, Rofanello, Rosciano, Rotondo, Sant'Andrea, Sant'Angelo, San Bartolomeo, Santa Croce, San Diego, San Giovanni, San Giuseppe, Santa Lucia, San Martino, San Rocco, Salcito, Santissimo Redentore, Troiano, Vaglie and Vicigliano.

== Economy ==
Tolentino is home to Arena, the swimwear brand, and Poltrona Frau, the noted designer of leather furniture and automotive interiors — as well as the Poltrona Frau Museum, designed by Italian architect Michele De Lucchi, to display furniture products.

== Main sights ==
- San Nicola Basilica Church
- Castello della Rancia
- Chiaravalle Abbey
- Sacro Cuore di Gesù Church
- San Catervo Church
- San Francesco Church
- Santa Maria della Tempesta Church
- Santissimo Crocifisso Church
- Teatro Nicola Vaccaj

== Notable people ==
The most famous Tolentinati are St Nicholas of Tolentino (c. 1246–1305) and the humanist Francesco Filelfo (1398–1481). Other notable people:

- St Thomas of Tolentino, medieval Franciscan missionary and martyr
- Niccolò da Tolentino (1350 – c. 1435), mercenary
- Nicola Vaccai (1790–1848), musician
- Mario Mattoli (1898–1980), film director

== Transport ==
Tolentino is about 60 kilometres (37 mi) from the western Flaminia insertion to Rome and 40 kilometres (25 mi) from the Adriatic sea and A14 highway to the east: the SS77 highway connects the town to both these state routes. There are bus lines from here to the nearby minor towns and villages and a railway leading from Civitanova to Fabriano. The nearest major airport is Falconara (Ancona), about 100 kilometres (62 mi) from Tolentino but linked by highway, and there is a tiny airstrip for ultralight aviation in the town's immediate surroundings.

== International relations ==
Tolentino is twinned with:

- Serravalle, San Marino (2020)

== Titular see ==
On 17 December 2022, the Holy See established the titular see of Tolentino. Prelates who have held the title are:

- Rolandas Makrickas (11 February 2023 – 7 December 2024)
- Maurizio Bravi (15 January 2025 - present)

== See also ==
- U.S. Tolentino
