= History of San Ginesio =

History of the municipality of San Ginesio, Italy

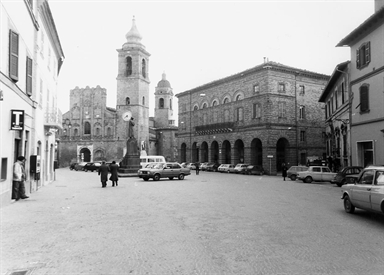
San Ginesio – Piazza Alberico Gentili in the 1980s

The history of San Ginesio encompasses the historical events pertaining to San Ginesio, a village in Central Italy located within the Province of Macerata in the Marche region.

== Ancient era ==
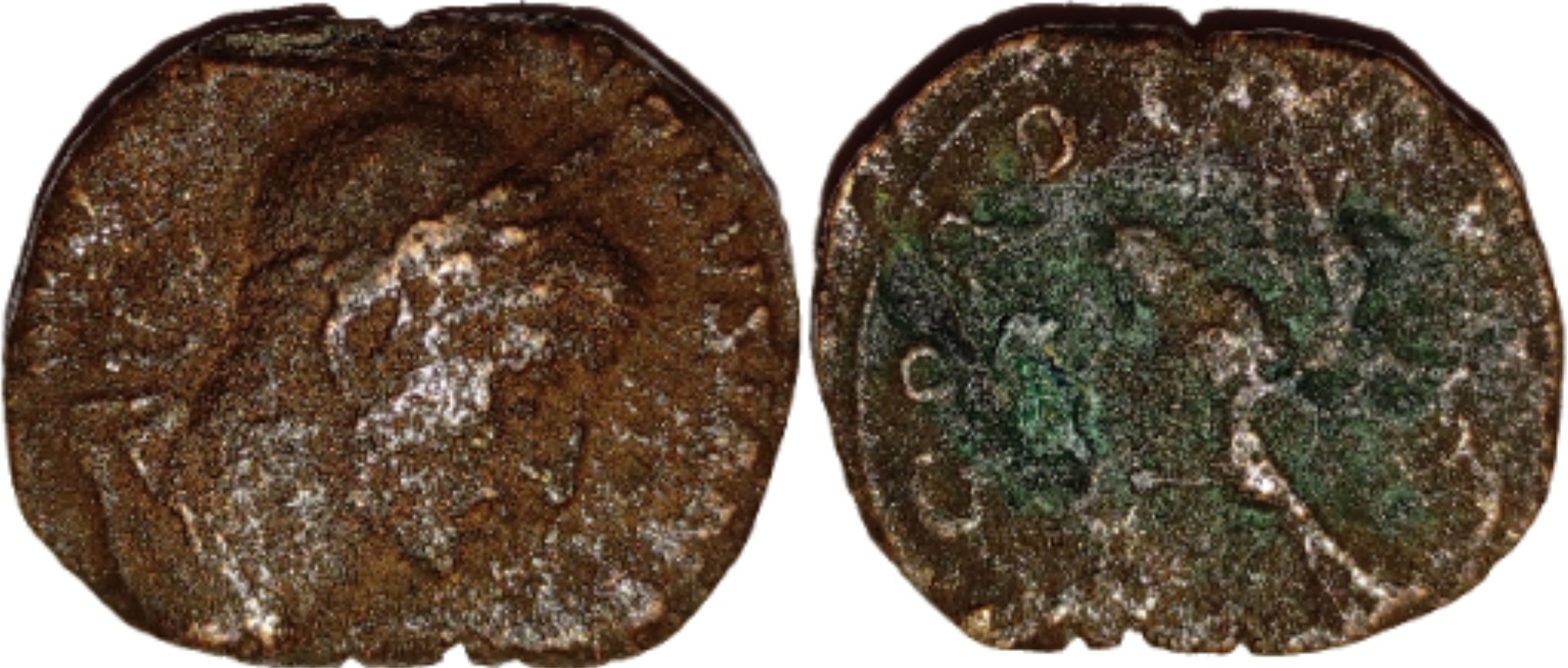
Sestertius in bronze of Gordian III depicting Concordia, discovered in the hamlet of Campanelle

The history of San Ginesio begins during the Picene era. The Picentes established settlements in the area, as did the Senones as early as the 1st millennium BC. Evidence supporting this was uncovered in 1884 outside the town walls, where objects associated with these populations were found near a skeleton. These groups inhabited the region for an extended period until the arrival of the Romans, specifically from the 3rd century BC to the 1st century AD, who expelled them and settled the territory. Consequently, San Ginesio became part of the Ager Gallicus. Numerous remnants of Roman presence have been discovered across various hamlets in the area: in the Cocoli area, artifacts such as a large tile, a tombstone, and a column fragment were retrieved by local citizen Ettore Marchetti and later donated to the municipal property; near Necciano, a Roman column was found; in the vicinity of Campanelle, several coins were unearthed; and near Pian di Pieca, additional coins and a funerary urn were discovered. Writers Begnini and Salvi, in separate works on San Ginesio's history, note that some names of present-day hamlets, such as Santa Maria in Alto Cielo, are of Roman origin.

San Ginesio features an urban layout in the shape of a Latin cross, encircled by an impressive circuit of castle walls. These fortifications still display medieval defensive features, including battlements, wall walks, arrow slits for archers, and watchtowers.

== Middle Ages ==
=== First invaders and the birth of the municipality ===
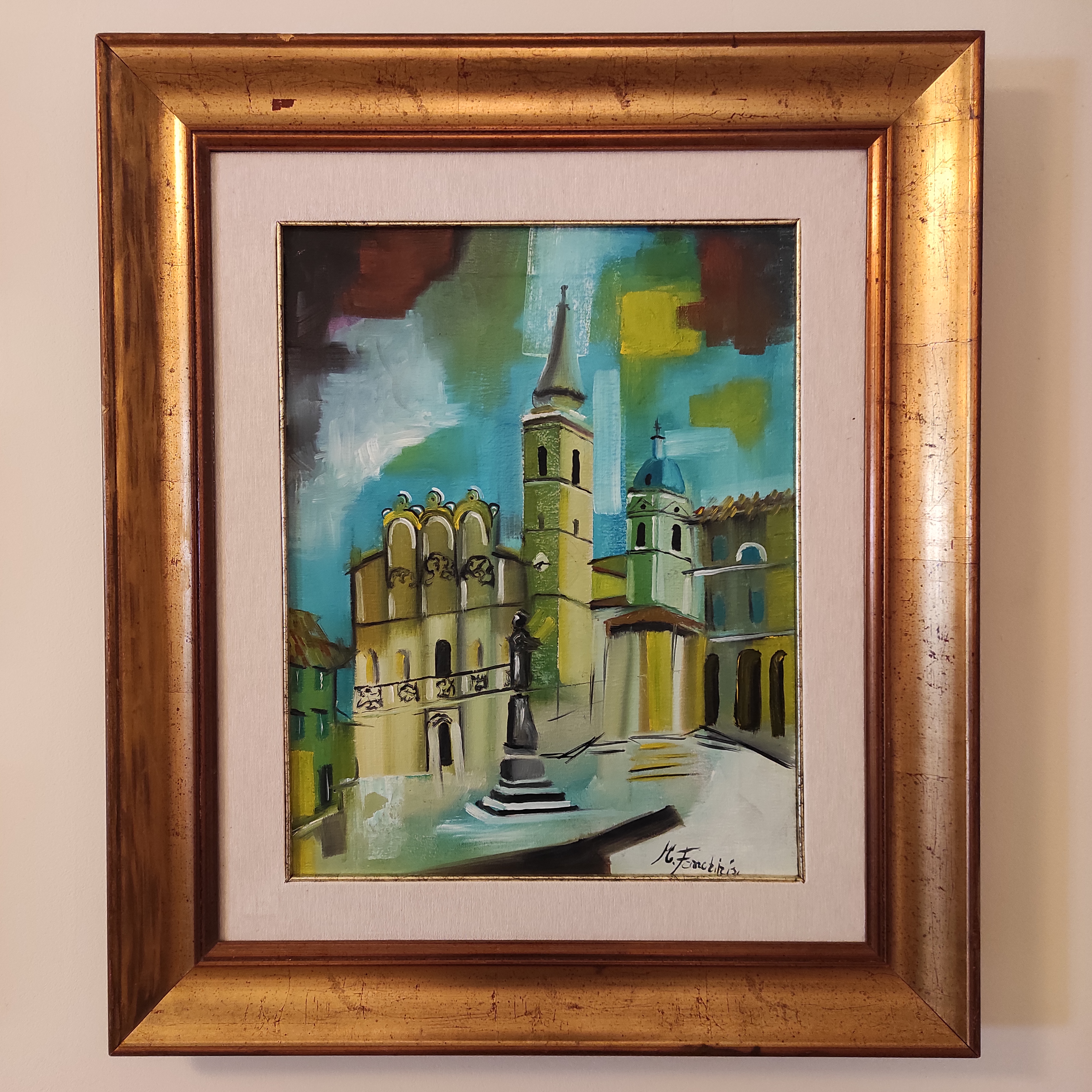
Marco Franchini, San Ginesio, oil on canvas, 40 x 50 cm, private collection. The facade of the Collegiate Church of Santa Maria Assunta and the statue of Alberico Gentili are clearly recognizable

The Goths and Lombards, the latter of whom were ousted by Charlemagne, conducted raids along the courses of the Chienti and Fiastra rivers, destroying Roman lowland settlements and forcing inhabitants to seek refuge in the more secluded hills, where nobles traditionally ventured for hunting expeditions. Around the 10th century, with the arrival of the Normans, lords of neighboring castles decided to construct a fortification on the highest hill to control the valley passage from a strategic vantage point.

Thus emerged the castle, which evolved into a commune when other nobles requested to join with their followers. Over the years, various writers have proposed alternative theories about San Ginesio's origins: Marinangelo Severini, in 1581, claimed it was founded by decree of Pope Leo XII; Alberico Gentili, in 1599, asserted it originated with the Romans and that its citizens triumphed in the Social War during the consulship of Lucius Marcius Philippus and Sextus Julius Caesar; Ferdinando Ughelli, in his Italia sacra, dated its founding to the 6th century; Abbot Telesforo Benigni, in 1793, argued the town existed in the 12th century and was expanded using the ruins of an ancient city called Castro, ravaged by barbarian tribes; and historian Ottavio Turchi, in 1872, suggested it arose in the 12th century from the noble families of Brugiano, Alvaneto, and Trensano atop the ruins of a city named Escolano. Paolo Riccomanni, in his work Della Cupramontana ginesina of 1750, tried to trace the origins of San Ginesio to the Roman civilization, but his study remained unfinished due to inadequate preparation, limited resources, and his sudden death.

Initially governed as a republic, the commune was led by two consuls, who soon gave way to a so-called magistracy, assisted by the podestà—specifically, five priors drawn by lot from prominent local figures, alongside an external magistrate appointed periodically. The priors represented the commune's five districts, named after lords who, after ceding their lands, received homes within the walls for themselves and their retinues. The earliest districts were Alvaneto to the north (still the name of a town gate), Trensano to the east—later surpassed in prominence by the Picena district that encloses the village—alongside Offuna (or Offune) to the south, and Brugiano. These areas were allocated to the wealthiest families of the time, though other affluent families, such as the Giberti, also settled in the territory over time.

The Caput Castri, now Via Capocastello, was the district where nobles established their residences. Following the fortification efforts of the noble Ascaro, it became known as Ascarana. San Ginesio lacked walls or fortresses before the 13th century. In 1170, under Emperor Frederick I, Marquis Marcualdo granted the castle of Vergigno to the people of San Ginesio. In 1188, the area was governed by Marquis Guarniero, who, after the death of Henry IV, supported Philip of Swabia against Otto IV.

In 1248, three distinguished men from Pieca settled within the village. With the authorization of Abbot Angelo Giberti of the Abbey of Rambona, approximately 150 additional individuals relocated, founding what is now San Ginesio's oldest church, San Michele at Colle San Giovanni. By 1278, the population reached approximately 7,000. Between 1200 and 1300, the free commune emerged as one of the most powerful and feared in the March of Ancona, bolstered by military victories against the noble Sarnano family Brunforte and the acquisition of properties from the Prontoguerra nobles of Ripe. These successes, however, provoked hostility from the March of Fermo, Fermo, and other rival communes.

=== Conflicts with the Brunforte, rule of the Da Varano, and dispute with Fermo ===
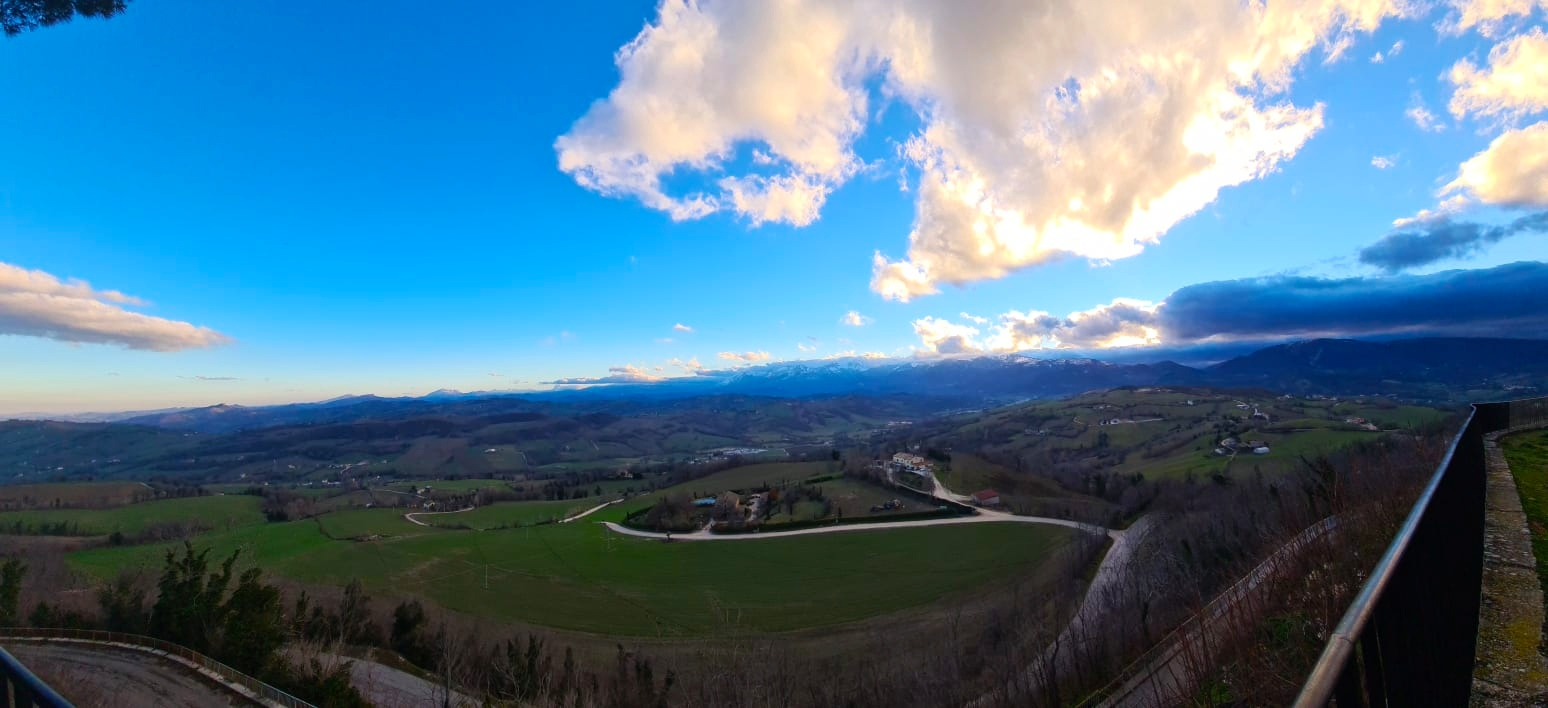
Panorama from San Ginesio to the southwest: "Pian di Sangue," where the Fermans were defeated, is clearly visible

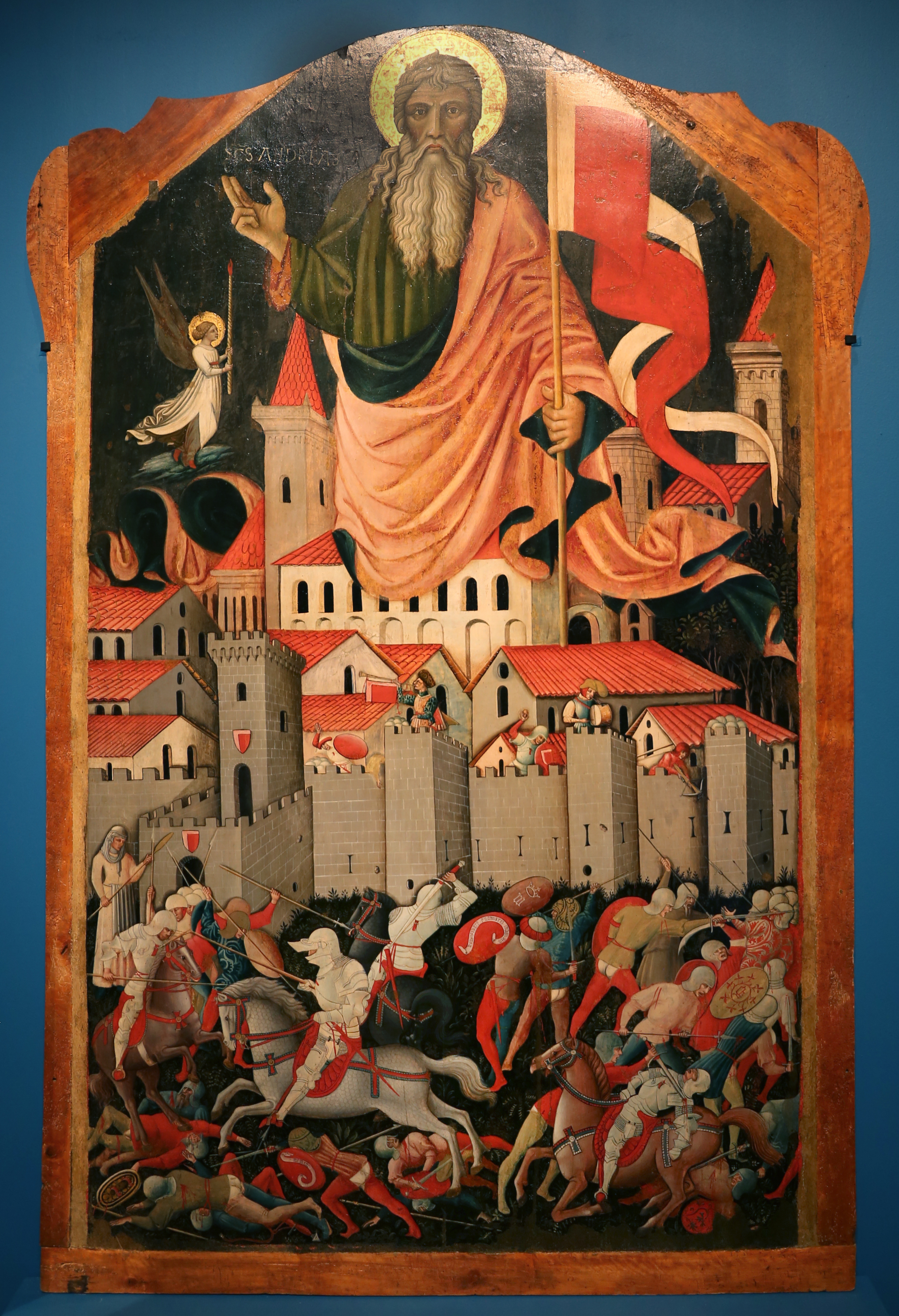
The Painting of Saint Andrew, depicting the battle between the Ginesians and Fermans at San Ginesio

Well known in local history are the military disputes between San Ginesio and the noble Sarnano-based Brunforte family, which the free commune ultimately won. The Brunforte holdings were threatened by San Ginesio's expansion and the growing autonomy of the Sarnano commune. When the family established itself in Italy, it controlled numerous territories, including Roccacolonnalta and San Liberato. In 1265, San Ginesio, with the support of Cardinal Simone Paltanieri, attacked the castle, as Rinaldo Brunforte faced papal condemnation that year. The siege persisted until 1272, when Brunforte dominance was reaffirmed, but by 1330, the commune purchased both the Hermitage of San Liberato and the Castle of Roccacolonnalta from the family.

Due to ongoing external wars and internal feuds, the Egidian Constitutions of the 14th century, enacted by Cardinal Gil de Albornoz to restore order in the Patrimony of Saint Peter while the papal seat was in France at Avignon, assigned the commune to the Da Varano dukes of Camerino. They governed from 1355 to 1434, first as a vicariate and later as a fief. The earliest rulers were Berardo I da Varano and Gentile II da Varano, but their successors, perceived by many citizens as tyrannical, were expelled by the populace.

Under Da Varano rule, tensions with the Fermans persisted; San Ginesio became the frontier between the Camerino lordship and the rival March of Fermo, serving as a bulwark to attack or defend amid two equally ambitious and clashing territories. On the night of 30 November 1377, the Fermans, led by Rinaldo di Monteverde, attempted a nocturnal incursion through Brugiano, the steepest and least fortified part of the town. A young baker, known as "La fornarina," spotted them while turning on her oven and raised the alarm, waking the sleeping Ginesians. The enemy was repelled after a battle at the foot of the walls in a plain since called "Pian del Sangue," with the conflict dubbed the Battle of the Fornarina.

=== Fall of the government, papal control, and antisemitism ===
In the 15th century, San Ginesio, like other European towns, witnessed manifestations of antisemitism. In 1409, Pope Gregory XII recruited 220 soldiers led by the Guelph Rodolfo Da Varano and his sons, funded by taxes levied on the commune's Jews. This tax, approximately 9 ducats in 1408, rose to 14 ducats by 1414. In 1448, San Ginesio's Jews appeared in tax records among modest contributors. They are described as a Jewish community "very active since the early 14th century, engaging in trade with Recanati, Fermo, the Kingdom of Naples, and Tuscany". After expelling the Da Varano from power in 1433, San Ginesio briefly believed it had regained its freedom until, from 1455, it fell definitively under the Papal State’s control as a territory "immediate subiecta" to the Papacy, a status it maintained throughout the old regime until Italian unification. The weakening of the Da Varano dynasty enabled the Milanese condottiero Francesco Sforza to subjugate numerous Church territories in 1434, which were later liberated in 1443 by another condottiero, Niccolò Piccinino, in papal service. From 1445, San Ginesio peacefully acknowledged its allegiance to the papal dominion, of which it had never ceased to be a subject. However, between 1450 and the election of Pope Pius II, there were attempts to restore the prior regime. Some 300 conspirators were identified and exiled, finding refuge in Siena. Their exemplary conduct there prompted Siena's rulers to send ambassadors to San Ginesio, successfully pleading for their pardon and permission to return. Accompanied by Sienese representatives, the exiles presented themselves at "Porta Picena," bearing a crucifix, the Crucifix of the Exiles, as a peace offering and, as a gesture of harmony, offered Siena's statutes as a model for San Ginesio's new municipal code. Drafted in the Sienese style, this was approved by Pope Pius II in 1458.

== 16th century ==
At the century's outset, San Ginesio was struck by a severe plague epidemic, concluding with a deadly outbreak of typhus fever. These diseases disproportionately ravaged the lower classes, decimating the peasant population and triggering a famine. Economic woes worsened with a bread tax imposed by Rome, sparking a rebellion in the Castle of Ripe. The costly and unresolved conflict persisted for a decade.

Within the March of Ancona, San Ginesio bore the brunt of authoritarian papal decisions, with successive popes acting as both spiritual leaders and temporal sovereigns, overseeing a state supported by an increasingly efficient yet stifling bureaucracy. The shrewd elite of San Ginesio, seeing limited prospects in the entrepreneurship and trade that had enriched prior generations, invested in university education for their offspring to pursue liberal professions. This shift yielded both constructive and perilous outcomes. Notably, the drafting of a new municipal statute, effective until Italian unification, was undertaken solely by local jurists—an uncommon feat. Amid a period when local autonomy waned under the rigid centralization of papal policy, civic pride shone through in the Magistracy's decision to commission a history of San Ginesio, drawing on documents from what was then termed the Secret Archive. Another spark of vitality emerged with the construction of a wooden theater seating 1,000, where the town's youth delighted in writing and performing comedies, drawing enthusiastic crowds—a cultural trend echoing the courts of Italian lordships.

Yet, alongside rising education levels, religious ideas began infiltrating the town, subtly spreading through universities and noble courts. Initially circulated via books from printers—greeted with enthusiasm by rulers—these ideas turned to suspicion and censorship efforts within the first two decades of the century.

=== The Gentili family and heresy cases ===
San Ginesio became entangled in two significant heresy trials. Before these events, Jesuit fathers, dispatched to assess the situation, described the town as a "Refuge of Lutherans," urging forceful persuasion to bring numerous citizens—estranged from sacraments—back to confession and communion in the main church, rooting them out from confraternity churches. Jesuits and Dominicans maintained a presence from the century's latter half. Neither their efforts nor the dread of the Holy Office swayed the Ginesian heretics, leading to the imprisonment of nine in Rome. They faced a public auto-da-fé in May 1568, conducted with great pomp and attended by cardinals at the Basilica of Santa Maria sopra Minerva.

Among those implicated was the Gentili family: physicians Pancrazio and Matteo Gentili, descendants of San Ginesio's ancient aristocracy. In 1579, Matteo—physician in Ascoli Piceno and politician in San Ginesio—fled the Italian Peninsula after multiple denunciations by the Inquisitorial Tribunal and the arrest of members of the Confraternity of the Sacred Heart of Jesus, where he served as prior. He headed to the Holy Roman Empire, specifically Germany, with his eldest son Alberico, later joined by his younger son Scipione. The brothers parted from their father, traveling to Tübingen, a university town: Scipione remained there, while Alberico, after stays in Heidelberg and Neustadt, arrived in London as an exile by mid-1580. An in-absentia trial concluded in 1581, erasing their names from public records via Damnatio memoriae. Their flight brought disgrace to other citizens and the family, condemned aqua et igni (loss of property and exclusion from public office) for three generations. Lucrezia Petrelli, Matteo's wife and mother to Alberico and Scipione, disinherited them in her will.

Alberico and Scipione achieved prominence in Protestant societies: Scipione became rector of Altdorf University in the free city of Nuremberg in Germany, while Alberico served the English monarchy, working as a royal lawyer and Regius Professor of Roman law at the University of Oxford. Author of De iure belli in 1598, he is still regarded as a founding father of modern International law.

The heresy charge burdened the town for the customary three-year proceedings, threatening excommunication and stalling municipal activities, including the printing of the new statute, completed in 1582 in Macerata. A Description of the Land of San Ginesio, compiled in 1592 by a local scholar for the Bishop of Camerino, portrayed the area as being rich in resources, but impoverished.

== 17th century ==
Ahead of the Jubilee of 1600, proclaimed by Pope Clement VIII, the Ginesians sent a re-enactment of the procession "Triumph of the Church" to Rome, originally performed by local confraternities during the Jubilee of Pope Gregory XIII in 1575. The participation of confraternities and citizens reflected the community's expiatory intent, seeking to affirm total submission to the Pope after inquisitorial trials in 1567–1570 and 1578–1581. Moved by this gesture, the pope gifted the left arms of Genesius of Rome and Saint Eleutherius.

For the arrival of the "Holy Arms," facilitated by Cardinal Pallotta's intercession, the confraternities commissioned two silver arms, housed in the Collegiate Church within an iron chest. The arrival of the relics triggered another procession, accompanied by the ringing of the bells of all the churches of the city.

With the donation of the Holy Cross by the Onofri family, the Ginesians organized a third procession throughout the territory.

Years later, the Magistracy and citizens paid tribute to a member of the influential Tamburelli family who became a bishop. These honors were bestowed strategically, as Captain Giovanni Benedetto Tamburelli funded the Collegiate Church's choir and an underlying chapel, crafted by the workshop of Ginesian artists Giuseppe and Domenico Malpiedi.

While religious fervor drove ambitious projects, consuming the commune's human and economic resources, the wool industry faltered, confining its trade to the local area. A recovery was spurred by revising municipal statutes, daily oversight of weavers, quality control of fabrics, and standardization of measurement units, marked with the community's seal.

This period's calm was disrupted by a man who, upon reviewing old family records, learned that an ancestor, Adami, was executed in San Ginesio during past wars with Fermo. Hiring armed men and exploiting a Lauretan procession that distracted the townsfolk, he attacked and damaged the ancient Torre di Morro, a defensive monument near Ripe San Ginesio. After verifying the facts, the matter was resolved without harming inter-city relations; the assailant was sentenced to life imprisonment and ordered to repair the damage.

The century ended bleakly: in 1699, fierce winds blew roofs off houses, followed by a summer hailstorm of large stones that destroyed crops and drove food prices to exorbitant levels.

== 18th century ==
The eighteenth century is renowned as the century of earthquakes. A series of tremors struck on 14 January and 2 February 1703, originating in the Valnerina and L’Aquila regions. Even though there were no fatalities, many homes sustained severe damage. Grateful for the absence of casualties, the populace sang hymns to the Sienese Crucifix. In June 1730, another violent quake from Valnerina hit with a V MCS intensity, forcing residents to abandon their homes and march in procession with the Crucifix of the Exiles, begging for protection from further ruin. The devastating seismic sequence concluded in July 1799 with a ferocious earthquake in Cessapalombo, registering VIII MCS in San Ginesio, causing a child's death from a collapsing ceiling and the fall of the Sant’Agostino church bell tower. Felt across the Marche and beyond, the Municipal Council honored Saint Emygdius, protector of Ascoli Piceno, for averting a worse catastrophe. In agreement with the Chapter of the Collegiate Parish, they decided to build an altar financed by the municipality near the baptismal font, adorned with a painting by Malpiedi dedicated to the Bishop of Trier, paired with another by the same artist honoring Saint Charles Borromeo on the opposite side.

Boundary disputes with Sarnano resurfaced during this period, echoing tensions from the late seventeenth century when the people of Sarnano claimed the church and convent of San Liberato. The quarrel was settled in San Ginesio's favor, aided by papal intervention. Undeterred, Sarnano sought recognition of Rocca Colonnalta's territory, joined by residents of Monte Ragnolo's slopes between Vallato and Rocca, demanding rights to their lands. Legal proceedings concluded in 1789, affirming traditional borders with Sarnano and denying the claimants’ rights beyond grazing and wood-gathering under San Ginesio's authority.

Earthquakes shaped and strained the century, impoverishing the San Tommaso confraternity, which struggled with consolidation works and lawsuits against a negligent architect who, despite shoddy efforts, won a favorable ruling. The Vatican Chapter, overseeing the church and hospice, dispatched inspectors, including the esteemed Abbot Telesforo Benigni. Married to a woman from a prominent local family, Benigni extended his stay, producing a meticulous Report of the Visit—a valuable history of the confraternity—and a two-volume Illustrated History of San Ginesio (Fermo, 1590 and 1595), featured contemporaneously in Giuseppe Colucci's "Picene Antiquities."

While San Ginesio struggled with earthquakes, Europe and the New World experienced the "Century of Enlightenment and Revolutions," marked by profound upheavals. Succession wars reshaped Italy's geopolitics, affecting the Savoys, Lombardy (from Spanish to Austrian rule under Maria Theresa), Tuscany (to the Lorraines), and the waning Republic of San Marco. The Papal States remained largely impervious to these global shifts.

Yet, within this ecclesiastically governed state, San Ginesio buzzed with cultural curiosity, embracing new historiographical and technological advances rooted in prior centuries’ scientific progress. The Caracciolini fathers at their convent established the Stellati Academy, hosting lectures on literature, science, and music, encouraging members to compose music, theater, and discuss agricultural innovations, local history, and contemporary events. Two authors revisited the town's narrative: Morichelli Riccomanni, in “Cupramontana Ginesina” (Loreto, c. 1760), proposed a Roman founding date, blending traditional style with a fresh focus on local architecture. Benigni's work, inspired by Ludovico Antonio Muratori’s rigorous historiography, relied on archival research. These cultural stirrings reintroduced the Gentili family—Pancrazio, Matteo, Alberico, and Scipione—whose works, despite censorship, began to be timidly reprinted in Venice (Giovanni Poleno, 1737) and Naples (Giovanni Gravier, 1763–1770).

A modest enlightenment glimmered in San Ginesio as the world surged ahead with the Industrial Revolution, the American Revolution, the French Enlightenment, and the French Revolution’s radical transformations.

== 19th century ==
=== Napoleonic era and Risorgimento ===
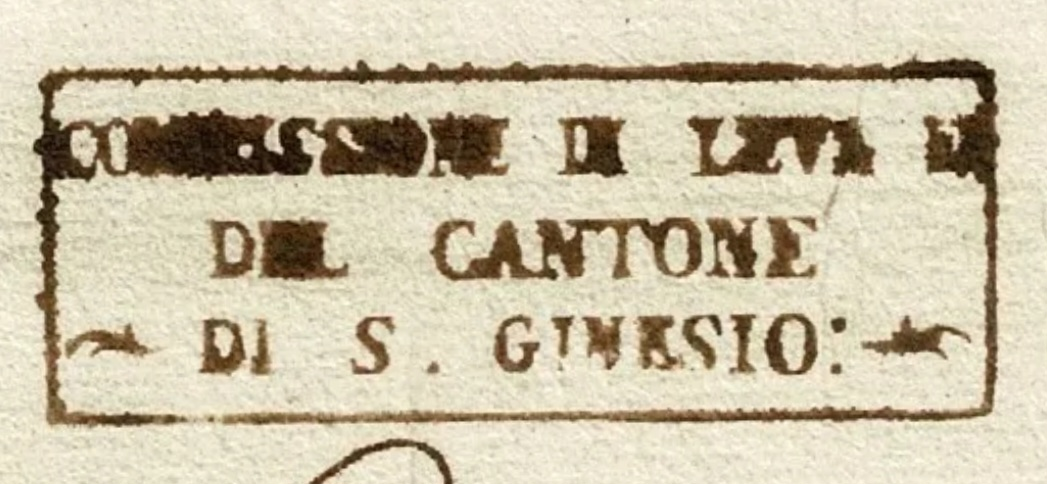
Stamp of the Military Service Commission of the Canton of San Ginesio

In the 19th century, San Ginesio's history aligned with Europe's Napoleonic trajectory. During the Roman Republic, it joined the Camerino District within the Tronto Department's 13 cantons. With the Marche’s annexation to the Kingdom of Italy, it separated from Camerino, becoming a cantonal seat in the Fermo District. As the 3rd District of the Tronto Department, it hosted a Vice-Prefect and offices for Census, Stamp and Registry, State Property, and the Salt and Tobacco Warehouse. Only in 1811 did it become a department alongside Ascoli and Fermo. It had numerous municipalities and hamlets under its jurisdiction, including Ripe, Camporotondo, Caldarola, Cessapalombo, Vestignano, Sant’Angelo in Pontano, Gualdo, Roccacolonnalta, Monastero, Morico, Colmurano, Montegiorgio, Monteverde, Mogliano, Falerone, Montappone, Massa, Monte Vidon Corrado, Francavilla d’Ete, Cerreto, Alteta, Loro, Sarnano, Amandola, Montefalcone, Smerillo, Monte San Martino, and Penna San Giovanni.

Following Joachim Murat’s defeat in 1815, most offices relocated, but little changed under provisional Austrian and papal rule until Pope Pius VII’s 1816 territorial reorganization into apostolic delegations, precursors to modern provinces.

On 24 June 1817, during the Night of Saint Lawrence, the first Carbonari uprising erupted in Macerata, involving several Ginesians from the local Carbonari chapter. Those arrested included:

- Gabriele Clementini (?-?): sentenced to 7 years; died shortly after 1817
- Ignazio Gentili (1791-Civita Castellana, 1823) and Raffaele Gentili (1793–1874): brothers sentenced to 7 years at Civita Castellana. They hosted Carbonari meetings at their San Ginesio home on 27 December 1816
- Raffaele Gentili (?-?): imprisoned in Pesaro
- Dionisio Germani (?-Pesaro, 1821): sentenced to prison, transferred to Pesaro in 1818 until death
- Bernardino Grasselli (?-?): jailed in Pesaro
- Gianfilippo Leopardi (1793–1875): 7 years between Civita Castellana and Perugia, leader of a local liberal secret society
- Giuseppe Leopardi (?-?): imprisoned in Pesaro
- Raffaele Migliarelli (1771–1843): 7 years in Civita Castellana
- Giuseppe Antonio Migliorelli (1782–1864): 7 years (5 in Perugia, 2 in Civita Castellana); joined the 1831 revolts
- Aniceto Mochi (1771–1843): 7 years in Civita Castellana; participated in the 1831 revolts

These punishments failed to quell Ginesian patriotism, which flared again during the 1831 revolts, targeting the papal old regime. Resentment began in 1830 with arrests of alleged agitators. Participants in 1831 included General Raffaele Bruti (1807–Signa, 1874), Antonio Leopardi, Raniero Mazzabufi, Filippo Mazzocchetti, Giuseppe Antonio Migliorelli, Aniceto Mochi, Illusione Morichelli, and Raffaele Petrelli. In 1848, supporting the Second Roman Republic, Giuseppe Puccinelli and Costanzo Severini died in Vicenza.

=== Birth of the Kingdom of Italy and changes in the city ===
The Battle of Castelfidardo on 18 September 1860, shaped a new Italy. By 20 September, San Ginesio established its Provisional Municipal Commission under Aristide Morichelli d’Altemps, confirmed in October by the Marche's Extraordinary Commissioner General, Lorenzo Valerio. With the annexation of the Marche and Umbria to the Kingdom of Italy, of 1,636 eligible male voters, 1,184 voted in favour, none against, with 452 abstentions.

In the early unified years, San Ginesio thrived through the generosity, integrity, and entrepreneurial spirit of its noble, intellectual, and liberal bourgeoisie, deeply committed to the national cause. However, public and religious institutions, like the Augustinians, underwent changes. The state education system in San Ginesio, with the consequent suppression of religious orders, obtained the Augustinian convent. Thus, in 1881, the State Secondary School was founded. renamed in 1887. Dedicated to Matteo Gentili until the Gentile Reform, it included a boarding school. The 13th-century Palazzo Defensorale in the square was also modified: the town hall moved to the Franciscan convent on Via Capocastello—seized from the order—and was replaced by the Giacomo Leopardi Municipal Theater in 1877.

Of great importance were the first road works: the entire territory, from internal streets to rural paths, was overhauled. The current SP 45 Falerense-Ginesina was built, and although most of the roads remained graveled, steep climbs, narrow alleys, and tight entrances were replaced with wider, more navigable —albeit longer— routes. In 1882, the municipal cemetery expanded onto the adjacent, now-suppressed Franciscan convent. In 1884, the administration joined a committee to extend the Porto San Giorgio-Amandola railway toward Umbria.

=== The earthquake of 12 March 1873 ===
On the night of 12 March 1873, at 20:04 (UTC+1), seismographs recorded a powerful earthquake of significant magnitude on the Mercalli intensity scale. The earthquake was confined to a narrow area between San Ginesio (the epicenter) and Camerino. Nonetheless, macroseismic effects were felt in 196 locations: 185 Italian, 8 Croatian, 2 Slovenian, and 1 Swiss. The town of San Ginesio suffered the most damage: the Morello hamlet, home to about six families, was razed and burned, the historic center saw 70 homes and the Church of San Francesco collapse, with the churches of San Tommaso, Barnaba, and the Collegiate Parish sustaining damage, along with widespread damage throughout the rural district. In Camerino, the second hardest hit town, the damage spread throughout the settlement, particularly affecting rural farmhouses, the Church of Sant’Antonio, the University of Camerino, and the prefecture.

=== The rediscovery of Alberico Gentili ===
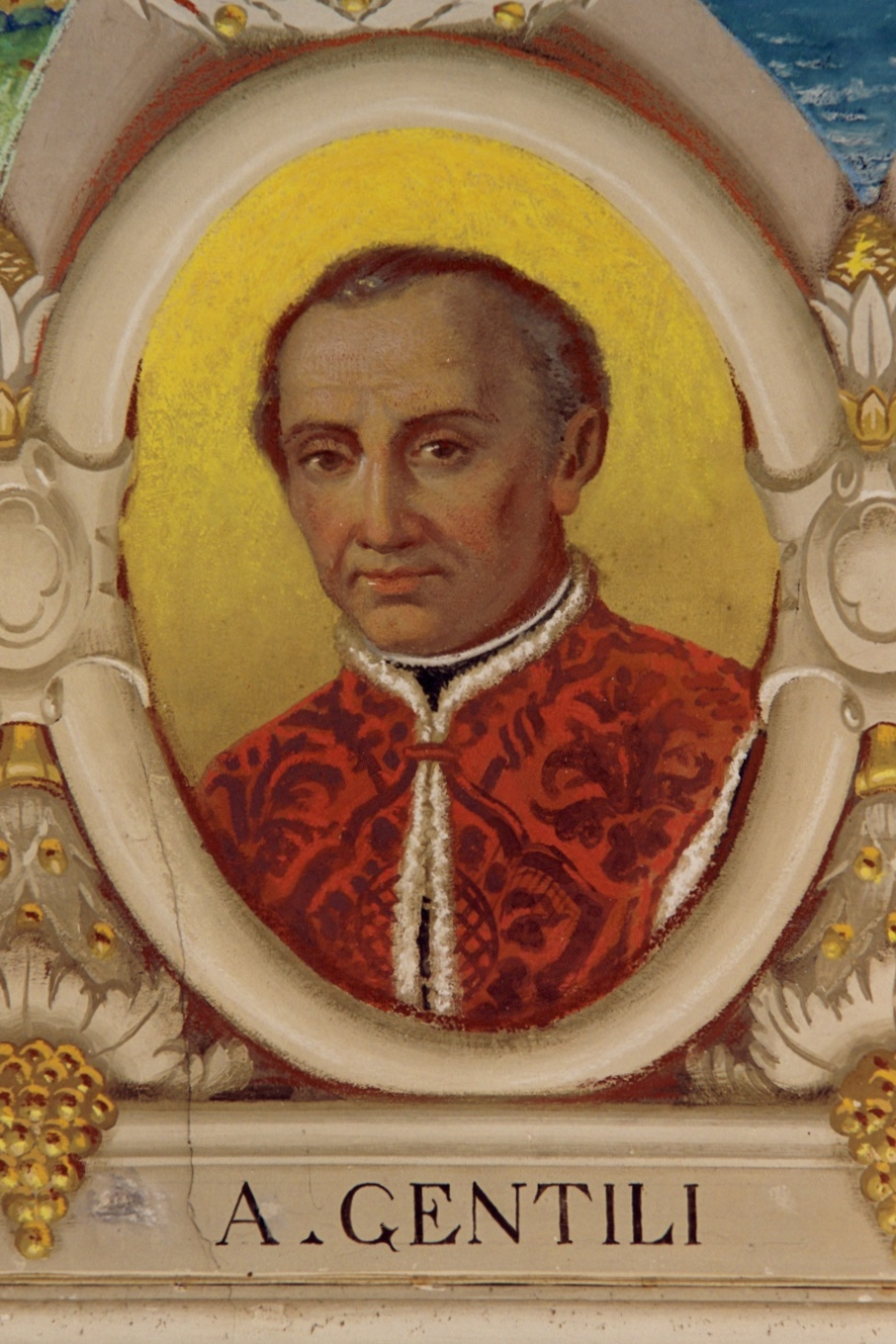
Alberico Gentili

After being obscured in the 17th and 18th centuries and after being censored in Italy by the Papal States, Thomas Erskine Holland, appointed professor of the new International Law and Diplomacy chair at the University of Oxford in November 1874, centered his inaugural lecture on Alberico Gentili. He argued that Gentili's De iure belli marked him as a founding father of international law. This news was warmly received in Italy: the Italian ambassador informed the Ministry of Foreign Affairs, which contacted the University of Macerata. The university's representative, journalist Pietro Sbarbaro, promptly engaged San Ginesio's administration to gather information on the jurist. Gentili's rediscovery sparked initiatives to honor him, including requests for his remains from the Anglican Church of London, the formation of an international committee to honor him, and the erection of a monument. In 1875, Macerata's Academic Council, spurred by Sbarbaro, established this committee in Campidoglio, an idea embraced across Europe: Otto von Bismarck and Franz von de Holzendorff of LMU Munich joined, though jurist Édouard René de Laboulaye questioned Bismarck's sincerity. Figures like Giuseppe Garibaldi and Aurelio Saffi also supported it.

While the Italian Committee collected the bids in a bank in Rome, the International Committee was unable to recover Gentili's remains, which were lost in a flood of the Thames. In compensation, a monumental plaque was erected in 1877 at Saint Helen's Church. While waiting for the monument, the municipality of San Ginesio dedicated the main square to Alberico, the main street to Scipione and the Normal School to Matteo Gentili. Perugia erected a commemorative plaque in its university, Rome erected a bust of him on the Pincian Hill, in Viale dei Giuristi, and the University of Macerata, during the construction of the new lecture hall, dedicated it to Alberico.

=== Discovery of early Picene-Senonian artifacts ===
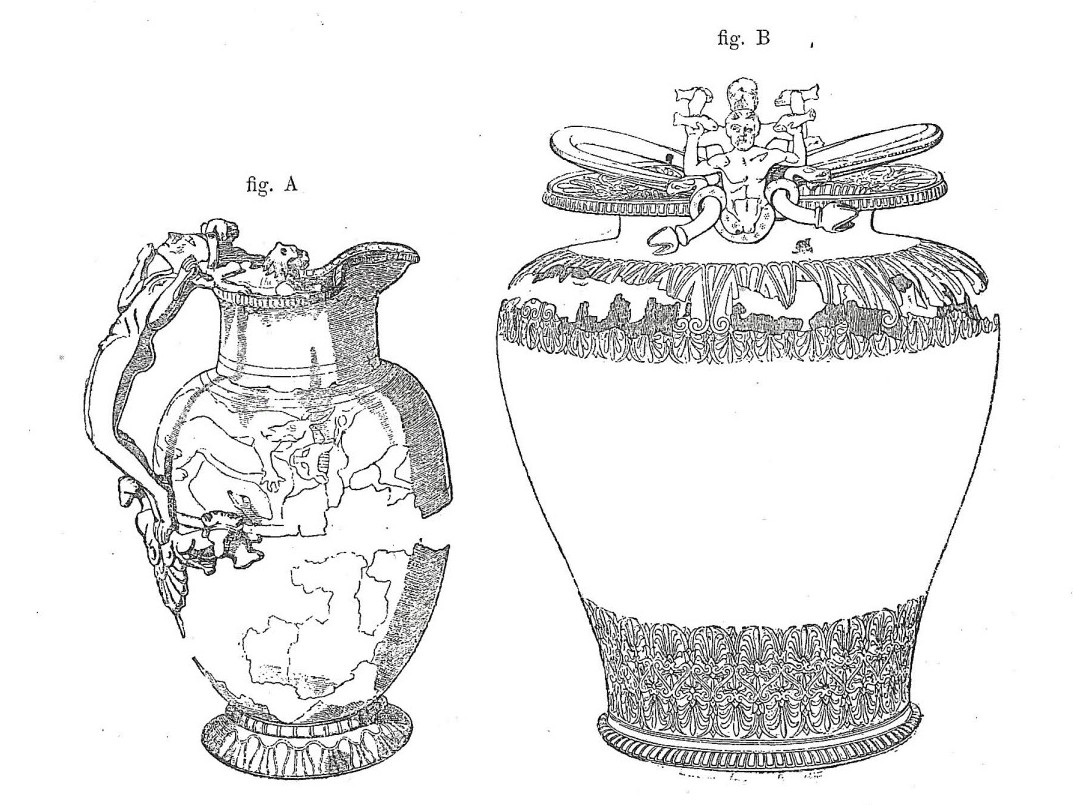
Drawing of the Oinochoe (fig. A) and Situla (fig. B) found in 1883, now at the Badisches Landesmuseum in Karlsruhe

In 1883, outside the town walls near Porta Picena, artifacts of Celtic Senonian or Picene origin were unearthed. A worker, Scarpini, extracting sandstone, stumbled upon bronze containers—later identified as an oinochoe and a situla. Eager for more, he dug further, halting only upon finding a skeleton with a silver-threaded skull, which was sold and melted.

Informed of this, Mayor Aristide Morichelli d’Altemps and municipal secretary Alfonso Leopardi invited archaeologist Aristide Gentiloni Silverj to excavate, preventing further theft or damage. Scarpini, believing the "green metal" vessels held gold, destroyed them; disappointed, he sent the remnants to a Roman friend who sold them to an unknown buyer. Gentiloni Silverj uncovered numerous items, including a cup handle, bronze vases, a metal helmet, a kettle-shaped vessel, an iron sword, an amphora, a spear tip, javelin remains, a knife, a lid, and a pendant—mostly preserved at the National Archaeological Museum of the Marches. Local finds were added to those from the estate of Aristide Morichelli d'Altemps.

The Scarpini artifacts, now at the Badisches Landesmuseum in Karlsruhe, were likely purchased in 1884 by the Grand Duchy of Baden for its state museum (Großherzogliche Sammlungen) via Ernst Wagner, director of antiquities, possibly through archaeologist Wolfgang Helbig, who acquired them from a Roman dealer named "Innocenti." In 1885, the oinochoe and situla were restored at the former "Römisch-Germanisches Zentralmuseum" in Mainz.

== 20th century ==
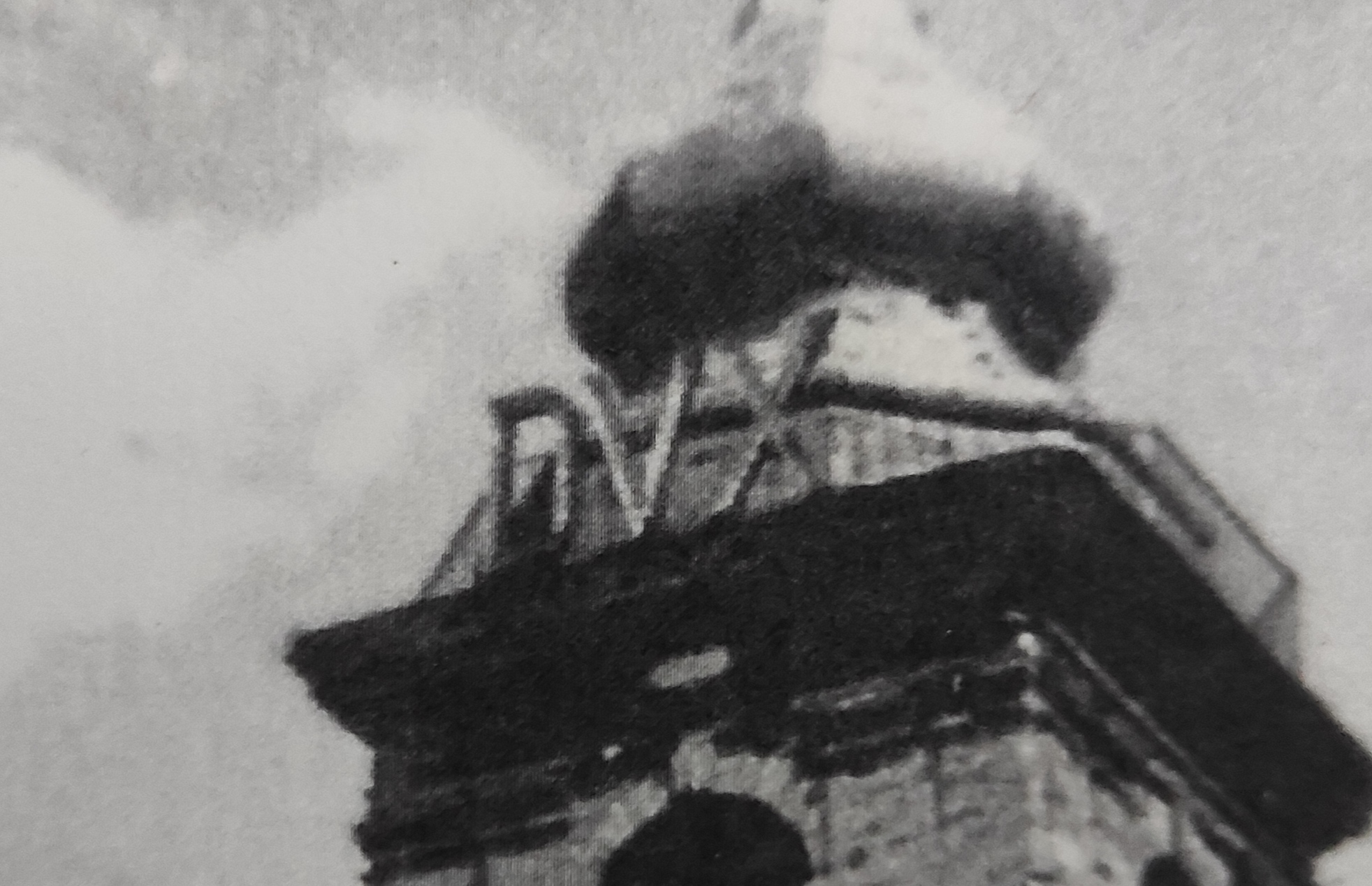
"DVX" inscription on the civic tower, a tribute to Benito Mussolini

In the early 20th century, San Ginesio was modernized with public lighting and a citizen-funded aqueduct, supplying 13 free water fountains by March 1911. This period saw the launch of Autolinee SASP, construction of a shooting range (1903–1904) designed by Ancona's Civil Engineers, a hydroelectric plant near Pesindolo (Molinaccio), and a statue of Alberico Gentili by Giuseppe Guastalla, unveiled in September 1908 with Minister of Public Education Luigi Rava. Dignitaries like Minister of Grace and Justice Orlando, Senator Canonico, Deputies Vecchini and Fusinato, Teodoro Moneta, and Ettore Ferrari honored Gentili by writing to the City Council.

In 1920, the citizens of San Ginesio decided to pay tribute to the 120 Ginesian citizens who died during the First World War. In 1921, a plaque by Giuseppe Guastalla was placed on the Civic Tower, with an epigraph by Senator Salvatore Barzilai, listing the names of the dead. In 1927, under the first podestà Giuseppe Piersanti, works included the Memorial Park by Ginesian Guglielmo Ciarlantini, a plaque for two gold medal recipients by Giuseppe De Angelis with an epigraph by Professor Enrico Mestica, and the book Sanginesio ai suoi eroi.

=== World War II ===
During World War II, San Ginesio served as a strategic link in the Marche. Positioned centrally, it bridged the region's north and south. In 1943, records are sparse, though local unrest persisted. In June, the Germans and the Partisans vied for the civilian hospital, which had been evacuated after the Axis had taken control following a protest. September and October saw only partisan acts of defiance against the fascist regime. Violence escalated in 1944. On 10 January, partisans disarmed Nazi-fascist soldiers and forced the podestà to distribute grain. On 11 January, Nazi-fascists retaliated, capturing the town by 12 January, sparking a fierce clash.

==== Formation of the partisan group "Vera" and first actions ====
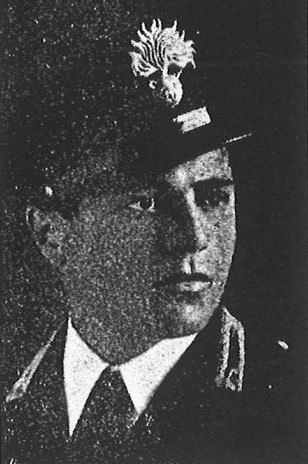
Sergeant Glorio Della Vecchia

After 20 January 1944, with the Man Mission, a mission ordered by the Second Badoglio government to represent the Kingdom of the South in the Macerata area, to recover loyalty to the monarchy and to oppose communist and republican ideas, some resistance groups were created. The "Vera" group in San Ginesio, comprising 20 Italians and 10 Slavs (armed individually), operated unofficially since September 1943. Led by Venetian Girolamo Casà, who fled Bari to join a nucleus founded by Sergeant Glorio Della Vecchia—including Umberto Graziosi, Vinicio and Tonino Bertoni, Mario Mogliani, Mario Sancricca, carabiniere Raniero Ciabocco, and Gino from Campanelle—Casà tried to fight the Nazis through the Royal Army Command of Macerata, but when he was rejected, he decided to lead the patriots instead of going to Teramo.

Clashes erupted between supporters of the new Italian Social Republic and opponents, with "Vera" members attacking local ex-National Fascist Party leaders and seizing arms, food, and supplies. The first firefight occurred at midnight on 10 January 1944, when a Nazi-fascist squad from Macerata, scouting near Porta Picena, battled "Vera," resulting in 10 deaths: 7 Nazi-fascists and 3 from “Vera”—Slavs Giorgio Raduvanovici and Zubo Banascerici, and Italian Italo Starnoni, who died two days later in hospital. In response, groups of Nazis and Fascists began rounding up people, while Prefect Ferazzani imposed food sanctions, reducing the amount of food available to the entire city and causing the price of eggs to skyrocket.

==== Morichella Events ====
From February to March 1944, “Vera” based itself near Col di Pietra. A patrol—Umberto Graziosi, Ivo Moretti, and Cosimo Montaldo—was sent to Morichella to monitor the plains near Pian di Pieca, flagged to the Luftwaffe as an excellent landing zone. On 10 March, near the Moretto tavern, they killed three Luftwaffe soldiers, burying them near the Molinaccio Hydroelectric Plant. The secret documents found in the vehicle were handed over to the Vestignano command, and the car was moved to Piobbico. Alerted by a spy, a heavily armed formation confronted "Vera." They besieged Col di Pietra without response, then threatened to raze Morichella unless the officers’ bodies were returned. Thanks to the intervention and wisdom of Brigadier Cavalli, a carabiniere from the San Ginesio barracks, the Germans decided to spare the inhabitants of the hamlet, as they were considered innocent, and after recovering the bodies of the three men, they left Morichella.

==== San Liberato Events ====
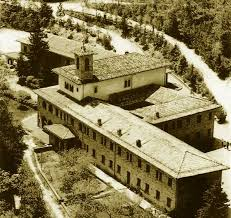
San Liberato convent in the early 20th century

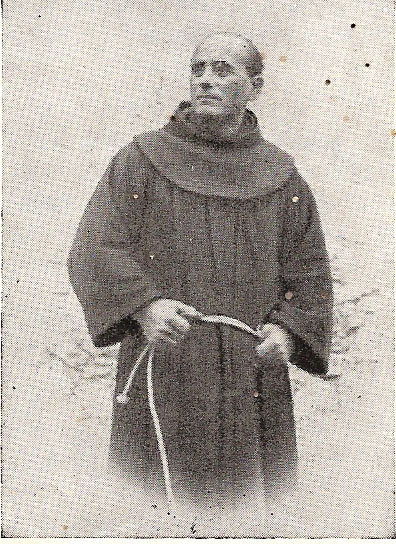
Father Sigismondo Damiani

On 16 March 1944, after the dissolution of the 201 partisan group by the Vestignano command and the Macerata National Liberation Committee (CLN), some members took refuge in the convent of San Liberato, led by Father Sigismondo Damiani. Reforming the group posed problems: the convent could not house a headquarters, resources were scarce (used by the partisans of Monastero and Piobbico), and the friars, fearing Nazi reprisals, opposed the presence of the partisans. Word of the hiding partisans reached the Nazis through the former Fascist spy Francesco Sargolini. The Brandenburg unit, in the midst of an anti-partisan roundup near Camerino, arrived at San Liberato and fired on two hunters mistaken for partisans, killing Gherardo Forti. Alarmed, the partisans fled. The Nazis threatened Damiani with death for harboring them and for finding a shotgun in one of the convent's rooms, which he claimed was for defense against the wolves, and persuaded him to surrender. On 23 March, Sargolini confronted Damiani; that evening, in Monastero, partisans under the command of Decio Filipponi seized, interrogated, tried, and executed Sargolini as a spy. Before he died, he accused Damiani of treason. On 9 May, Damiani, summoned by three unidentified men, was captured, wounded and killed in the convent by escapees from the Sforzacosta concentration camp.

==== The clash in Campanelle and the recruitment in the Fiastra area ====
On 5 May 1944, near the Fiastra river in Campanelle, five "Vera" partisans clashed for two hours with the "IX September" blackshirt battalion from Sarnano, which was conducting a roundup along the SS 78. Two of them managed to escape in a moment of confusion, and those who were captured were Glorio Della Vecchia, Giovanni Fornari and Ivo Pacioni. Fornari and Pacioni endured brutal torture and interrogation. Della Vecchia, who had been allowed to change clothes after being recognized by a former comrade from the invasion of Albania, passed his home on his way to the San Ginesio Pass. Pacioni, dazed, revealed it as the residence of their commander (Della Vecchia's alias, Lieutenant Salvati). Subsequently, all three were shot near the crossroads of Passo San Ginesio. Their bodies lay exposed for two days, after which the militiamen ate at the restaurant "Da Isolina." The Autolinee SASP drivers Francesco Corradini (testimony to the San Ginesio carabinieri, 17 March 1946) and Armando Paccamicio claimed that they were executed without interrogation by unknown Italian SS units at about 8 pm. These killings surfaced in the "Armadio della vergogna" investigation.

The battalion left after two days, returning on 16 May to conscript men born 1914–1927 who could not hide, and the elderly, offering amnesty until 25 May for "rebels" who surrendered.

==== Pian di Pieca events ====
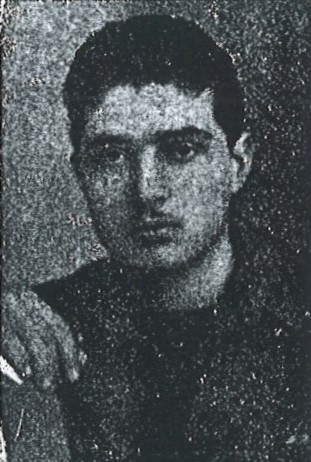
Mario Mogliani

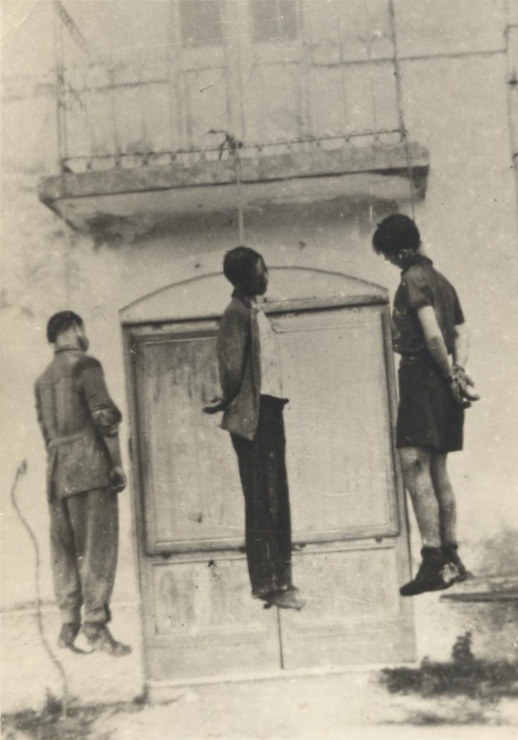
Photo of the bodies of the partisans Antonio D'Arduin, Mario Mogliani and the civilian Benedetto Tardella.

On 16 June 1944, "Vera" learned of a Fascist espionage unit in Pian di Pieca. A team of three men – Tonino Bertoni, Cosimo Montaldo and Antonio D'Arduin, led by Mario Mogliani – was sent to guard the Macerata-Ascoli Piceno road, ambush the spies and sabotage the infrastructure (cutting telephone and telegraph lines, destroying bridges). During the night of 16–17 June, snipers were positioned in a wheat field along the SS 78. On 17 June, in the rain, they shouted "Halt!" and fired at a German officer, seriously wounding him; he was taken by Red Cross ambulance to the hospital in Sarnano. The Nazis took hostages from Colle, Morichella and Pian di Pieca, including the local priest Don Sesto Mosca, and searched for the culprits. The fugitives took refuge in a town house, but after resting, they split up when they heard gunshots nearby. Cosimo fled into the fields; Mogliani and D'Arduin, captured in the town, were taken to Piazza Alberico Gentili with civilians. The latter were rescued by a Ginesian marshal of German origin who, being fond of the city, convinced the Nazis to release them, thus avoiding a massacre.

The German unit then took the prisoners to Pian di Pieca. On the balcony of the Mancini family's shop, Mogliani and D'Arduin were hanged at 6 pm. A third, civilian Benedetto Tardella, who had stopped at the San Ginesio pass with grain and was considered a partisan, was also hanged. A witness recalled his desperate cries of innocence until he was silenced. Before retreating, the Germans fired revolver shots at the corpses. The bodies were hung from Saturday evening until Wednesday morning. On 21 June, Captain Casà and an engineer cut them down and placed them in the post office.

==== The destruction of the Molinaccio hydroelectric plant ====
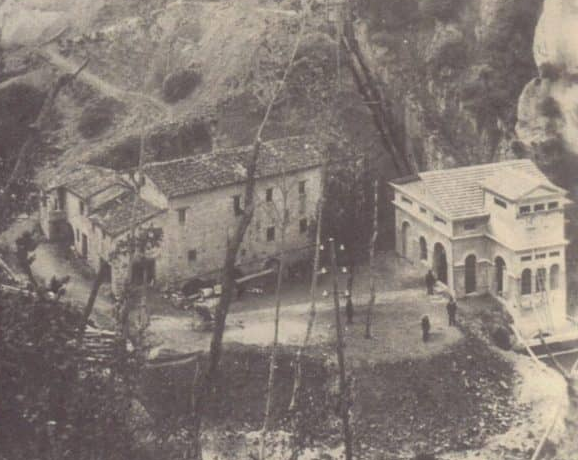
Molinaccio Hydroelectric Plant in the early 20th century

On 18 June 1944, a German sapper unit arrived by truck at the Molinaccio plant with explosives to destroy it. Simultaneously, "Vera" Captain Girolamo Casà, with Lt. Arnaldo Angerilli, Ivo Moretti, Bersagliere Volpes, Romolo Vannucci, "Spartaco" Division secretary Ernesto Sarti, and Navy soldier Vinicio Bertoni, returning from Fiastra after meeting members of the co-belligerent army to plan Macerata's liberation, were warned by Morichella's Pascucci of the Nazis’ intent. Armed with two rifles, a pistol, and a bomb, they engaged the truck guards, firing without hitting them. Hearing the first German blasts, 21-year-old Vinicio Bertoni approached a haystack to conserve ammunition, but as he dodged a grenade, he was exposed and shot in the chest. Outgunned and out of ammunition, "Vera" retreated; the plant was destroyed. His body was recovered after the Nazis left and taken to the church in Morichella.

==== The end of the war and the trials ====
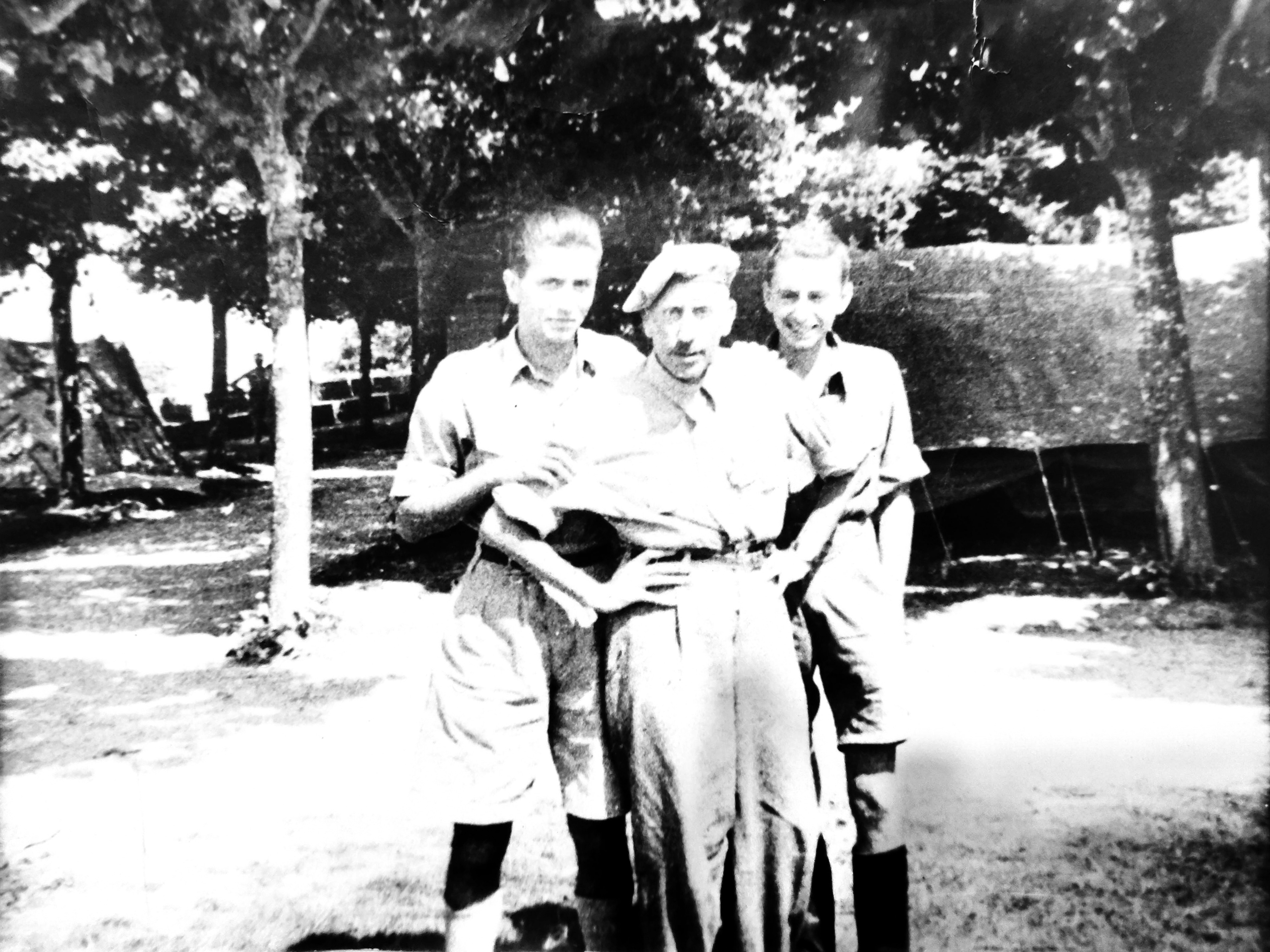
General Giorgio Morigi, commander of the 184th Infantry Division "Nembo", with Ugo Morigi (left) and his son Giulio Morigi (right) at the Colle Ascarano base, summer 1944.

On 20 June, "Vera" liberated the municipality; the CLN took over the administration and unanimously appointed Cesare Barbi as mayor (president). That same day, the 184th Infantry Division "Nembo", led by General Giorgio Morigi and part of the CIL, set up a base at Colle Ascarano to supervise the liberation operations: Tolentino (evening of 20 June), Macerata (21 June), Villa Potenza (1 July) and Filottrano (9 July). Dismantled in September 1944, many soldiers formed lasting bonds with the locals. After the departure of the Nembo, a military convoy of the British Army, led by an Italian-British sergeant, arrived in the village. The soldiers stayed in various places, including the Central Hotel and the Gentili School, until they left.

Post-war trials dealt with the Passo San Ginesio, Pian di Pieca, and San Liberato incidents. Suspects included unknown SS troops for the first two, and Piobbico partisans for San Liberato. The latter were acquitted for lack of evidence, but an appeal on 11 March 1954, reopened the case and confirmed the guilt of Lucas Popovich (a Slav whose family was allegedly killed by the Fascists) and the Sardinian Luigi Cuccui (who escaped from a prison in Ancona). Partisan testimonies cleared Damiani of suspicion, emphasizing his aid to the Resistance.

=== After the referendum ===
Under CLN rule since 20 June 1944, San Ginesio voted for a republic in the 1946 referendum, with 3,165 votes for, 1,103 for the monarchy, out of 4,592 voters (88.51% turnout), including 243 blank and 81 spoiled ballots.

In the late 1980s, Mayor Vittorio Giorgi (Christian Democracy) commissioned a new book on the history of the municipality. Written by Father Alfonso Porzi, T.O.R., of the Convent of San Francesco, it complements earlier works by Canon Marinangelo Severini (1581), Abbot Telesforo Benigni (1795), Canon Giuseppe Salvi (1889), and Professor Ermelinda Gazzera (1915). It reinforces the tradition of documenting the history of San Ginesio, detailing religious figures such as bishops and Cardinal Benedetto Farabrik.

The 1997 Umbria and Marche earthquake damaged structures such as the church of Santa Maria in Vepretis, the Morichelli d'Altemps Palace, and the Giacomo Leopardi Theater.

=== Pact of San Ginesio ===
In 1969, Arnaldo Forlani and Ciriaco De Mita forged an agreement to rejuvenate the Christian Democratic Party and position themselves at its helm. This pact became known as the "Pact of San Ginesio". At the congress, Forlani became secretary of the party, with De Mita as his deputy, to discuss a generational change (from the second to the third generation) and to plan the succession of Giuseppe Saragat. In 1972, following the agreement and the approval of the center-right government of Giulio Andreotti, Forlani was succeeded as secretary of the DC by Amintore Fanfani at the following congress, signaling the victory of the second generation over the San Ginesio cohort. However, the renewal of the DC, which the young participants of the San Ginesio meeting claimed to represent, took an unexpected turn with the advent of the Tangentopoli scandals.

== 21st century ==
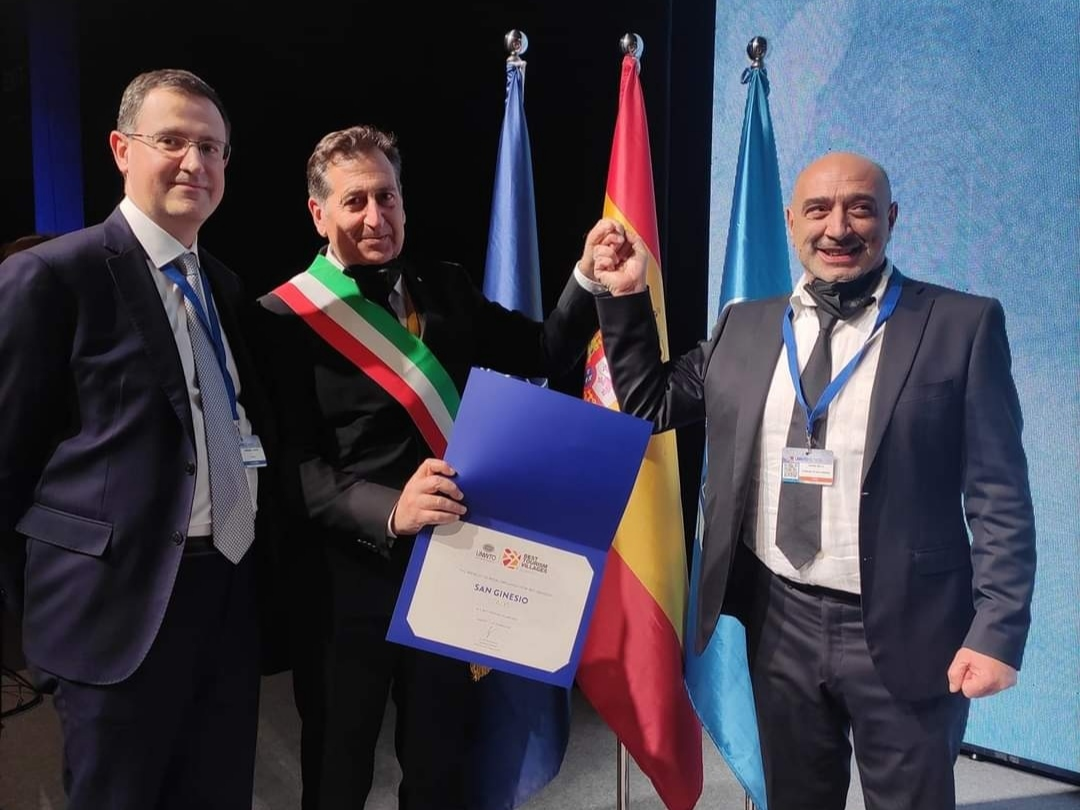
Mayor Ciabocco and Deputy Mayor Belli receive the award from the World Tourism Organization

During this period, the municipality garnered numerous accolades: the Bandiera arancione (Orange Flag) from the Touring Club Italiano since 2002, recognition as one of Italy's most beautiful villages, the Yellow Flag from the Italian Touring Campers Association, and the designation as a municipality friendly to itinerant tourism. On 2 December 2021, San Ginesio was honored in Madrid by the World Tourism Organization (UNWTO) of the United Nations as Italy's "Best village for tourism in 2021," marking it as the first Italian village to receive this prestigious award. The rationale for awarding San Ginesio the Orange Flag is articulated as follows:

This harmonious and well-preserved town, immersed in the important naturalistic environment of the Monti Sibillini National Park, stands out for its highly efficient tourist information service, characterized by a welcoming and accessible office equipped with a wealth of information material. Its commitment to environmental protection is also noteworthy, as evidenced by an effective waste management system and a high percentage of mixed waste collection.

=== Earthquake of 2016 and 2017 and reconstruction ===
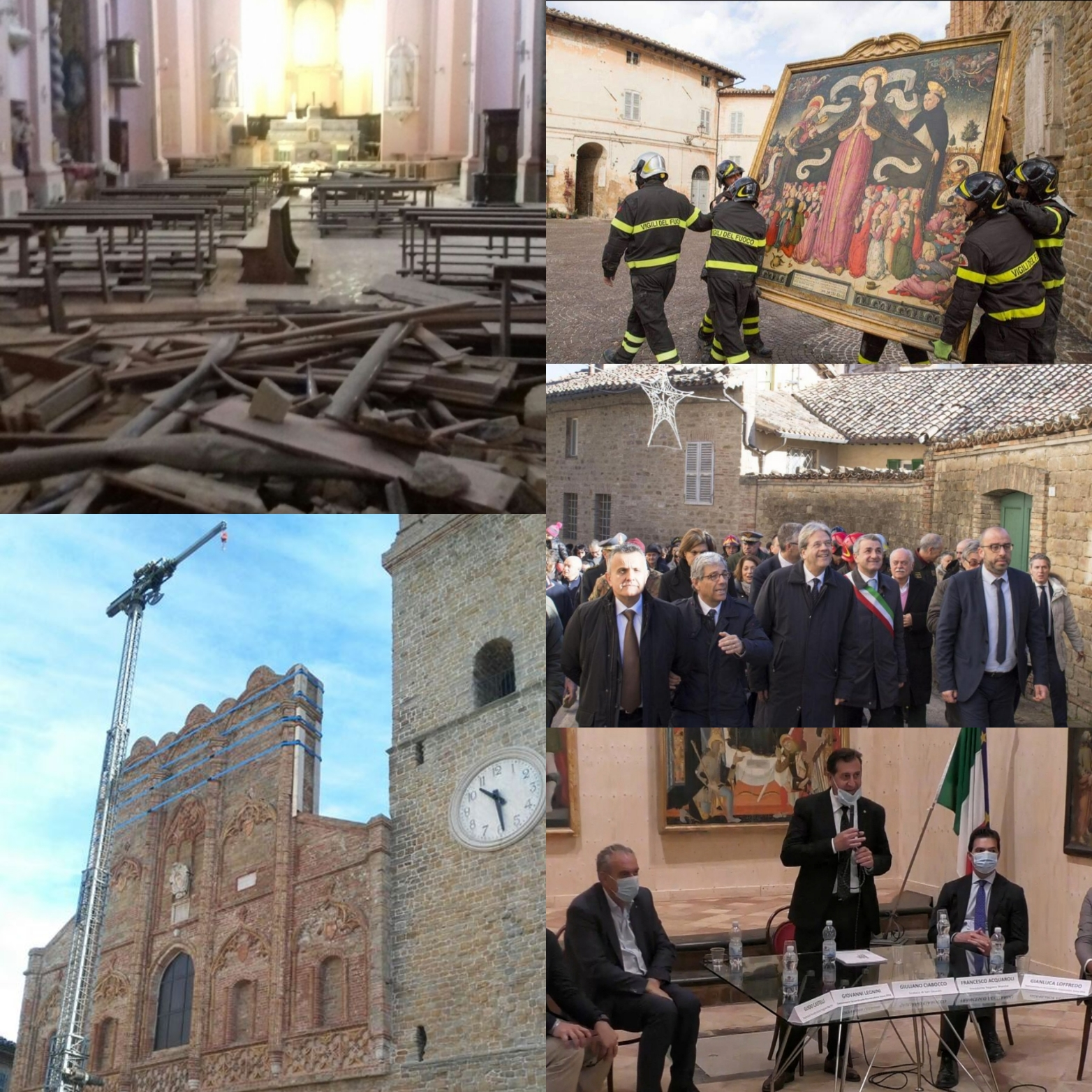
From left to right: structural collapse in the Church of San Francesco, firefighters recovering works of art from churches closed for safety reasons, securing the Collegiate Church of Santa Maria Assunta, Paolo Gentiloni's visit to the village, conference with Mayor Ciabocco, Legnini and Acquaroli regarding the 2021 Special Ordinance on Schools.

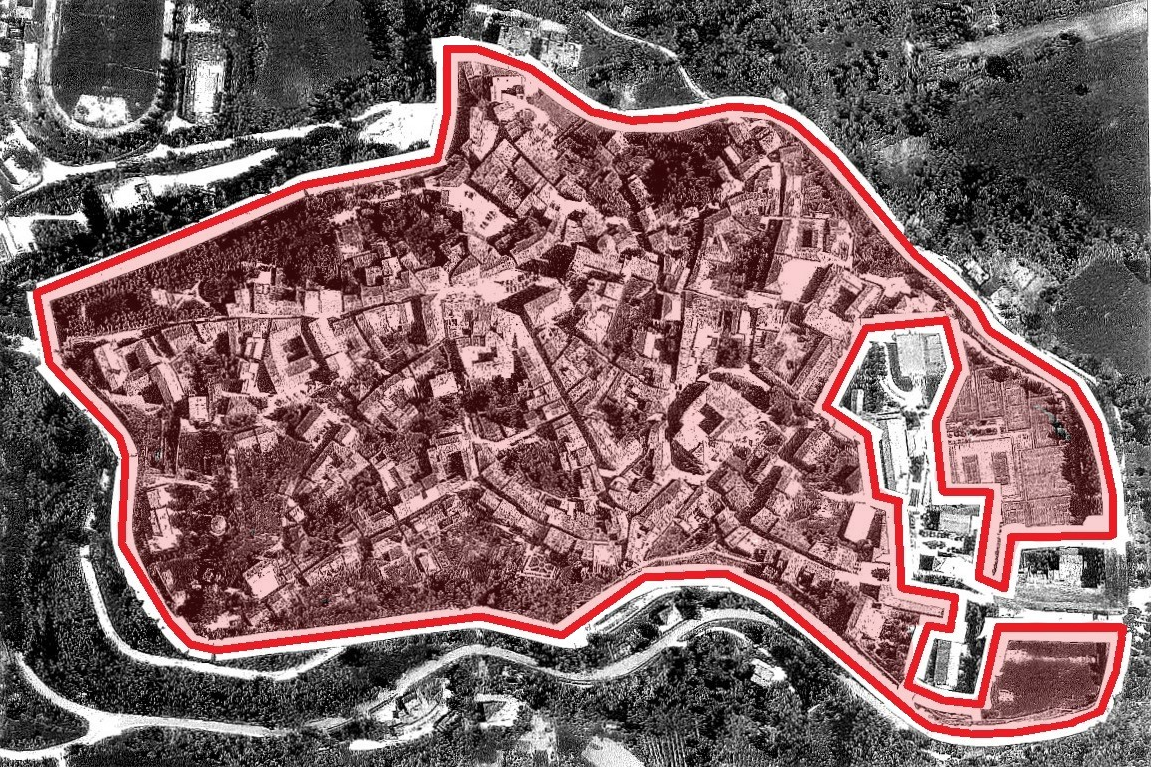
The "red zone" of the historical center of San Ginesio, identified by the Technical Office, which includes most of the public and religious buildings of significant historical importance.

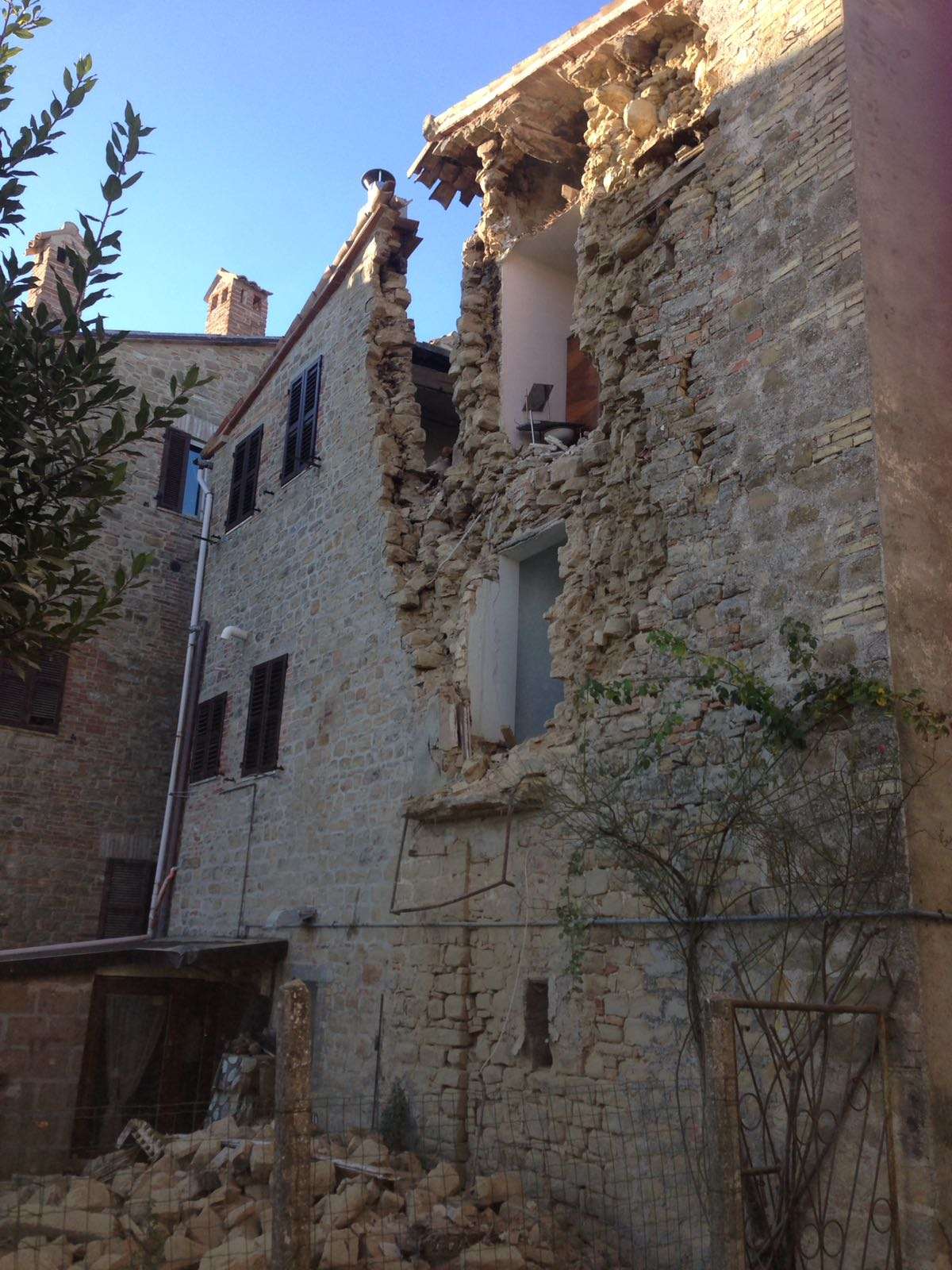
A house in San Ginesio's historic center affected by the 2016 earthquake

Due to the seismic swarm of 2016 and 2017, the village and several of its hamlets sustained profound damage. As of 29 October 2018, the reconstruction progress stood at a mere 0.5%. Following the 2016 earthquake, approximately 500 residents were forced to abandon their homes due to their structural uninhabitability, with the most severely impacted public buildings being the churches, the theater, the town hall, and over half of the schools in the area (4 out of 6). Until the delivery of the S.A.E. (Emergency Housing Solutions), displaced residents were temporarily housed in the municipal hostel. Below are details of the S.A.E. areas within the territory:

Location	S.A.E. Areas	S.A.E. Requirement	Expansion	Delivery Year	S.A.E. 40 m^{2} (430 sq ft)	S.A.E. 60 m^{2} (650 sq ft)	S.A.E. 80 m^{2} (860 sq ft)
Campo Sportivo	1	12	No	2017	7	3	2
Pian di Pieca	1	19	No	2017	10	4	5
Santa Maria in Alto Cielo	1	7	No	2017	4	1	2

On 24 August 2016, the then Prime Minister Paolo Gentiloni visited the red zone villages, including San Ginesio, accompanied by the President of the Marche Region Luca Ceriscioli, then-mayor Mario Scagnetti, the Extraordinary Commissioner for Reconstruction Vasco Errani, and the head of the Civil Protection Fabrizio Curcio. On 20 May 2017, the then Vice President of the European Parliament David Sassoli, joined by the mayor and former regional assessor Angelo Sciapichetti, made a stop in the village to assess its condition.

Former mayor Scagnetti, in an interview with Cronache Maceratesi (a local newspaper) published on YouTube on 24 August 2016, highlighted the differences between this earthquake and the 1997 events, noting his immediate mobilization that morning along with the local Civil Defense and other volunteers. In an 30 October 2016, interview with Il Messaggero, the day of the strongest earthquake, Scagnetti reported around 600 displaced individuals and a heavily damaged historic center, while in an interview with TV Centro Marche, he stated that San Ginesio, being entirely a historical center, was completely in the red zone.

In 2019, 236 declarations of uninhabitability were filed, with 1,300 damaged buildings, 61 active construction sites, and all churches rendered unusable. Of the 350 private structural uninhabitability claims (205 minor and 145 serious) submitted to the municipality since 2016, 170 were approved, with 100 construction sites completed by 2020. The municipality received a total of €39,092,476 in economic contributions. The total estimated cost for the restoration of 10 churches in the municipality of the Archdiocese of Camerino-San Severino Marche was €4,650,000 . This year, the municipality was chosen as the "leading municipality" for the reconstruction efforts. Throughout 2020, the Extraordinary Commissioner for Reconstruction, appointed by the second Conte government, Giovanni Legnini, told ANSA that he was working to overcome the stalemate and was collaborating with the city administration and the Marche region on possible solutions. The first "red zones," the most critical and vulnerable areas of the affected village, were established by Mayoral Ordinances No. 2 for the historic center (2 November 2016) and No. 134 for the hamlet of Vallato (3 November 2016), and were not officially lifted until 2019, after a series of boundary adjustments that facilitated the gradual reopening of streets.

==== Condition of religious buildings ====
Below is a detailed list of the damaged religious buildings:

Building	Ordinance No.	Type	Location	Owning Entity	Unusable Since	Usable Today	Usable Since	Ref. Unusability	Ref. Usability
Abbey of Santa Maria delle Macchie	39	Abbey	Macchie	Parish of San Michele Arcangelo	8 September 2016	No			
Church of San Giovanni Battista	40	Church	Campanelle	Parish of San Michele Arcangelo	8 September 2016	No			
Church of Santa Chiara	41; 220	Church	Historic center	Institute of Franciscan Sisters of Santa Chiara	8 September 2016; 7 June 2017	No			
Church of Santa Maria in Alto Cielo	202	Church	Santa Maria in Alto Cielo	Parish of Santa Maria d'Alto Cielo	31 May 2017	No			
Church of Santa Maria in Selva	214	Church	Morichella	Parish of Santa Maria Assunta in Pieca	6 June 2017	No			
Collegiate Church of Santa Maria Assunta	215	Collegiate church	Historic center	Parish of Santissima Annunziata	6 June 2017	No			
Church of Santa Maria Assunta in Pieca	216	Church	Pian di Pieca	Parish of Santa Maria Assunta in Pieca	6 June 2017	Yes	6 May 2019		
Church of San Costanzo	217	Church	San Costanzo	Parish of Santa Maria di Piazza (Sarnano)	6 June 2017	No			
Church of Santa Croce	218	Church	Santa Croce	Parish of Santa Maria Assunta in Pieca	6 June 2017	No			
Church of San Gregorio	219	Church	Historic center	Parish of Santa Maria d'Alto Cielo	7 June 2017	No			
Church of San Francesco	221	Church	Historic center	Parish of Santissima Annunziata	7 June 2017	No			
Church of San Giacomo	222	Church	Historic center	Benedictine Nuns of San Giacomo	7 June 2017	No			
Church of San Liberato	223	Church	San Liberato	Provincia Picena S. Giacomo della Marca dei frati minori	8 June 2017	Yes	31 December 2018		
Church of San Michele	323	Church	Historic center	Parish of Santissima Annunziata	11 October 2018	No			
Church of San Giacomo in Morico	324	Church	Morico	Parish of Sant'Andrea (Cessapalombo)	11 October 2018	No			

==== Condition of school buildings ====
In the days following the late October 2016 tremors, after accommodating the displaced, the municipality and administration prioritized constructing a large school complex within the historic center, funded by the state. The feasibility study was commissioned by the municipality on 23 December 2016, urban compliance was approved by Mayor Mario Scagnetti on 23 January 2017, and on 2 February, an agreement was signed with the University of Ancona for the development of a project, approved by the commissioner's office on 7 August. Construction began with the demolition of tennis courts of the FIT center, built in 1985, adjacent to the old kindergarten, which was razed to make way for the new facility. In January 2017, one of the first ordinances of the Gentiloni government stipulated that the school could only be built on publicly owned land. On 31 May 2018, the then Extraordinary Government Commissioner for reconstruction of affected areas Paola De Micheli, alongside Mayor Scagnetti, laid the cornerstone of the school. The new complex, designed to accommodate 350 students with high energy efficiency, near-zero emissions, and photovoltaic panels generating 40 kW, was planned to house the Alberico Gentili Secondary School (liceo linguistico and liceo delle scienze umane), the IPSIA Renzo Frau (Furniture and Interior Design and Mechanics sections), the kindergarten, the elementary school, a 300-seat auditorium, and a CONI-approved gymnasium for volleyball and basketball.

On 9 May 2018, the Ministry of Cultural Heritage expressed concerns about the project in terms of height to limit the visual impact due to its proximity to the castle walls, but on 11 June—the same day the new administration took office—the Ministry halted construction due to incompatibility with a ministerial decree from 13 July 1984. This decree protected the area between the walls and the Pilgrims’ Hospital under Article 21 of the Royal Decree-Law 1089/39, later Article 45 of the Legislative Decree 42/2004, as a buffer zone "strongly permeated by its still preserved relationship with these walls [...] forming an indispensable whole, also for the constant visual perception in relation to the adjacent historic urban fabric." The problem was reported by the Superintendency for Archaeological Heritage of the Marche Region, which had already had problems with the Municipality the previous year, when it sent an email regarding the school complex project without receiving a reply. Prior to that, the Superintendency had never participated in meetings to discuss the project.

During Prime Minister Giuseppe Conte's visit to Norcia on 20 May 2019, for an operational meeting with the mayors of the Red Zone, Mayor Ciabocco asked the Prime Minister for clarification on the future of the school complex, valued at 13 million euros, stressing that the students would bear the consequences of its absence. Commissioner Piero Farabollini, who took office on 4 October 2018, faced criticism from citizens and the media regarding the management of the project and his performance. He dismissed the controversy as pointless, noting that the choice of the site was a municipal decision and that neither the municipality, the province of Macerata, nor the MIBACT officials of the Marche region had flagged the constraint.

On 2 October 2020, the project of the school complex was relaunched after more than two years of stagnation, with the resolution n. 28 of the Municipal Council authorizing Giovanni Legnini to act with special powers. In June 2021, the reconstruction of the school complex and the previously destroyed sports area near the Auditorium Sant'Agostino was launched by special ordinance 9/2021, with the participation of the Regional President Acquaroli, the then Regional Budget Assessor Guido Castelli and the Sub-Commissioner Gianluca Loffredo. The ordinance 9/2021, valued at €20,844,376.71, was structured in three parts:

- The first part, "Lot A", includes the construction of three new school facilities (Kindergarten "G. Ciarlantini", Elementary School "F. Allevi" and High School "A. Gentili"), a new public park to enhance public spaces and new sports facilities. The estimated cost is €12.769.057,87 ;
- The second part, "Lot B", involves the construction of the new IPSIA "R. Frau" headquarters by the Andrea Bocelli Foundation (ABF), which has been rebuilding schools in Sarnano, Muccia and Camerino since 2016, at an estimated cost of €7,453,035.50;
- The third part, "Lot C", includes the restoration of the old sports facilities demolished for the previous school complex, planned in 2016, inaugurated with its cornerstone in 2018 by Commissioner De Micheli, and later stopped by the Superintendence. This phase, which was completed and inaugurated in 2021, cost €622,283.36 .

On 16 January 2023, during a press conference at the Auditorium Sant'Agostino, attended by the new Extraordinary Commissioner of the Meloni government, Guido Castelli, Sub-Commissioner Loffredo, Mayor Ciabocco and representatives of ABF, it was confirmed that work on Lot A and Lot B would begin between April and May. Lot A would be built with respect for the surrounding environment and historic landscape, while Lot B, covering 2,800 m^{2}, would use precast concrete due to price increases caused by the Russo-Ukrainian War, increasing the cost to around 9 million euros, unlike the schools built by the Foundation in Muccia, Camerino, and Sarnano.

=== Birth of the "Ginesio Fest" ===
Since 2020, the municipality, through the initiative of the Promoting Committee and Mayor Giuliano Ciabocco, has established a national award for the art of acting (Premio San Ginesio) and several festive days in August known as the Ginesio Fest. Chaired by Remo Girone, the project aims to offer a beacon of hope following the 2016 earthquake's devastation and to overcome the pandemic emergency caused by COVID-19. The award is bestowed upon the best actress and actor, selected by a jury. Since the Middle Ages, the municipality has traditionally celebrated the Roman saint with festivities on his feast day from the 12th century, with additional festive days introduced by Andrew of Perugia.

== See also ==
- San Ginesio

== Bibliography ==
- Gazzera, Ermelinda (1915). Santo Ginesio et lo suo antiquo archivio, sec. XII-sec. XVIII [Saint Ginesio and Its Ancient Archive, 12th–18th Century] (in Italian). Tolentino: Stab. tipografico "Francesco Filelfo".
- Allevi, Febo; Crispini, Giuseppe (1969). San Ginesio [San Ginesio] (in Italian). Ravenna: Angelo Longo Editore.
- Salvi, Giuseppe (1889). Memorie storiche di Sanginesio (Marche) in relazione con le terre circonvicine [Historical Memories of Sanginesio (Marche) in Relation to Surrounding Lands] (in Italian). Camerino.
- Porzi, Alfonso (1986a). San Ginesio terrazza delle Marche, potente castello medievale piceno [San Ginesio, Terrace of the Marche, Powerful Medieval Picene Castle] (in Italian). Vol. 1.
- Porzi, Alfonso (1986b). San Ginesio terrazza delle Marche, potente castello medievale piceno [San Ginesio, Terrace of the Marche, Powerful Medieval Picene Castle] (in Italian). Vol. 2.
- Istituto comprensivo Vincenzo Tortoreto (1997). Sanginesio et lo suo antiquo archivio [Sanginesio and Its Ancient Archive] (in Italian). San Ginesio: Comune di San Ginesio.
- Peretti, Nada; Ferroni, Giacomo (1908). Per Alberico Gentili nel III centenario della sua morte [For Alberico Gentili on the Third Centenary of His Death] (in Italian). Rome: Bernardo Lux.
- Benigni, Telesforo (1795). San Ginesio illustrata con antiche lapidi ed aneddoti documenti [San Ginesio Illustrated with Ancient Inscriptions and Anecdotal Documents] (in Italian). Fermo: Torchi di Pallade.
