= San Giovanni, Belforte del Chienti =

Church in Belforte del Chienti, Italy

Coordinates: 43°09′42″N 13°14′22″E

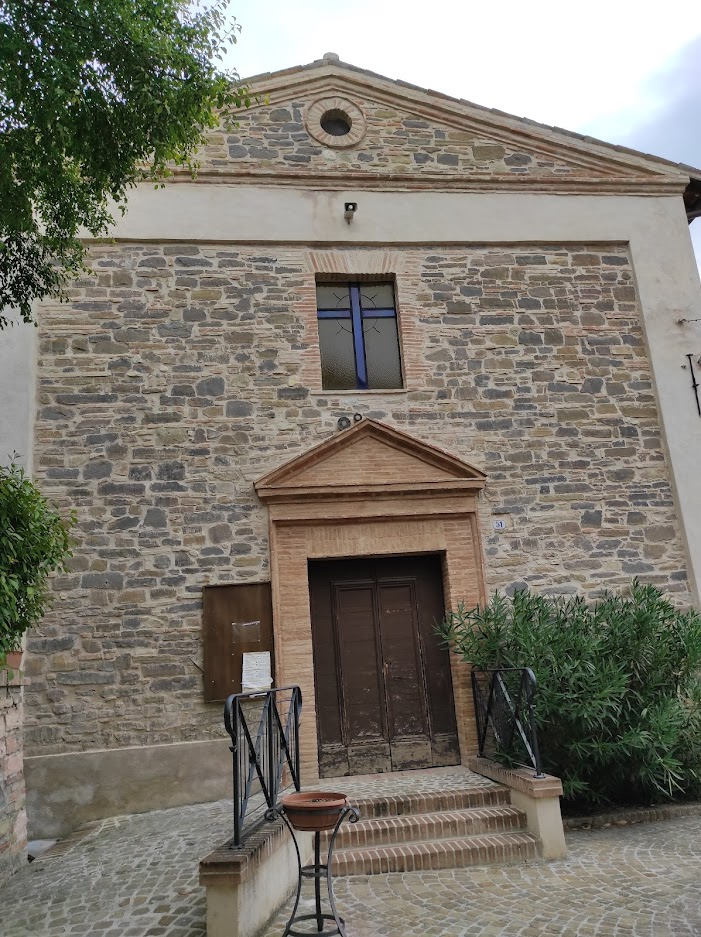

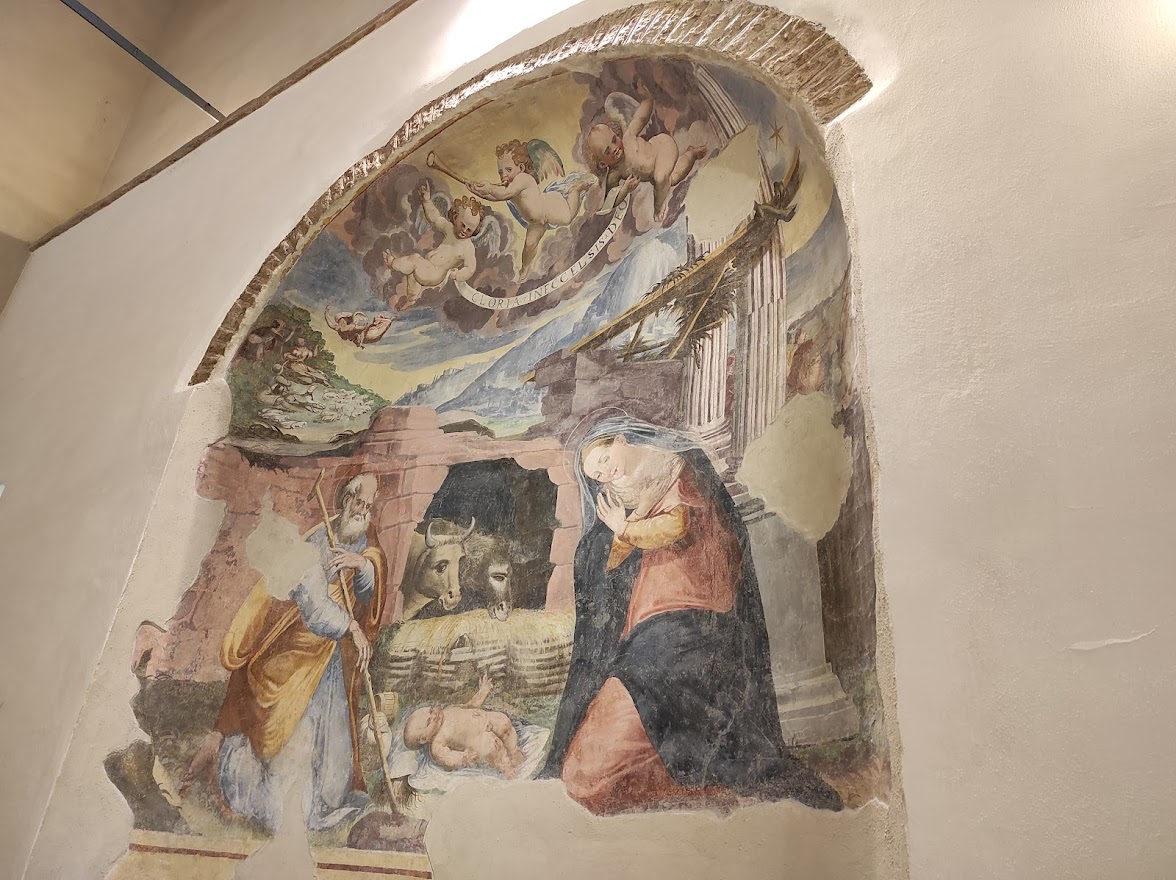

San Giovanni is a Roman Catholic church located in the frazione of San Giovanni of the town of Belforte del Chienti in the province of Macerata, region of the Marche, Italy.

The church, built in the first half of the 14th-century, is open only to guided tours. The sober façade reflects its relationship to a Romanesque-style, Benedictine order monastery, though later the church was property of the Dominican order, and called San Domenico. The interior has frescoes of the Nativity and Madonna of the Rosary (1558) by Giovanni Andrea De Magistris.
