= Belforte del Chienti =

- Comune
- Comune di Belforte del Chienti
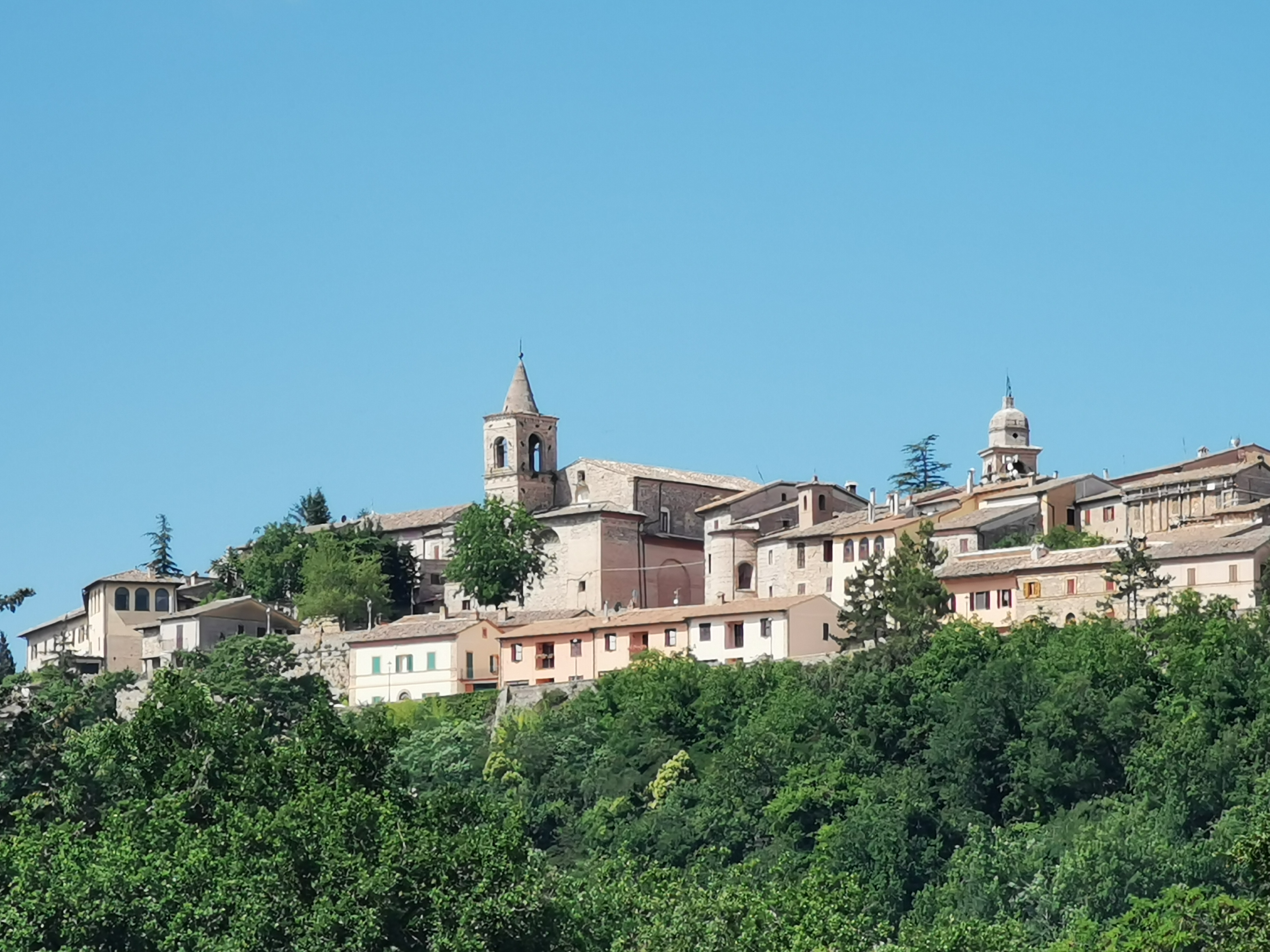

- Location within Italy Location within Marche
- Coordinates: 43°09′50″N 13°14′25″E
- Country: Italy
- Region: Marche
- Province: Macerata (MC)

Government
  - Mayor: Alessio Vita

Area
  - Total: 15.9 km^{2} (6.1 sq mi)
- Elevation: 347 m (1,138 ft)

Population (31 november 2019)
  - Total: 1,878
  - Density: 118/km^{2} (306/sq mi)
- Demonym: Belfortesi
- Time zone: UTC+1 (CET)
  - Summer (DST): UTC+2 (CEST)
- Postal code: 62020
- Dialing code: 0733
- Website: Official website

Belforte del Chienti is a comune (municipality) in the province of Macerata in the Italian region Marche, located about 80 kilometres (50 mi) south of Ancona and about 50 kilometres (31 mi) southeast of Macerata.

== Physical geography ==
Belforte del Chienti borders the following municipalities: Caldarola, Camporotondo di Fiastrone, Serrapetrona, Tolentino.

The church of San Giovanni once linked to a Benedictine monastery, and the church of Sant'Eustachio a Belforte del Chienti are present in the town.

== History ==
The name of the town derives from the happy geographical position and indicates precisely a "Bel Forte" or "beautiful fortress".

The castle built in the twelfth century was immediately part of the jurisdiction of Camerino until 1255 when it allies with Tolentino to surrender to the latter city in 1256. The official passage to Tolentino took place under Henry II Ventimiglia in 1260.

In 1435, Belforte was annexed to the domains it already had in the Francesco Sforza area.

Subsequently, the history of Belforte del Chienti became part of that of the Papal States first and then the new Italian state.

== Monuments and places of interest ==
=== Church of Sant'Eustachio ===
It is located in the town square and documents mention it from 1218, although its present form dates back to the period following the 1741 earthquake, as reported in an epigraph on the external wall on which it is written: Turris haec / a fulm [ine] ac terrem [otu] / percussa / restau [rata] fuit / a [nno] Domains / MDCCXXXXI //. Translation: This tower, after being struck by lightning and an earthquake, was restored in the year of the Lord 1741. Its interior houses the spectacular polyptych made by Giovanni Boccati in 1468. The work, enclosed in an elaborate and precious frame in gilded wood, measuring 4.83 m high and 3.25 m wide. It consists of twelve panels, five of which form the lower register and seven the upper one; from eighteen mirrors of which six are inserted in the lateral pillars and twelve in the predella, and from five medallions. Overall, the figured tables amount to thirty-five; to these are added the two side scrolls with the inscriptions in which the names of the customers and the year of execution appear. The painter's signature is located on the step at the base of the throne of the Virgin. After the recent restoration, the work has found its ancient location near the main altar. Continuing along the right wall, there is a painting showing the Madonna and Child (also called Madonna against the storms), Saint Eustace and Saint Eleuterio. As soon as you enter the church, on the left, you can see the statue of Saint Eustace on board his horse, a work carried in procession during the feast of the patron saint (May 20).

=== Church of San Sebastino ===
Outside the inhabited center, almost behind the city walls (in fact called in Latin "extra moenia"), there is the restored and, over time, enlarged church of San Sebastiano, built under authorization issued by the bishop of Camerino in 1479 to protect the plague. The first thing that stands out as soon as you are in front of this church is the portal decorated with terracotta tiles. Its interior is divided into two naves by three arches that support the roof. The bell of the binnacle during the last restorations was removed and is now kept in the Belfortese Town Hall. An ancient document reports that in the place of worship there were two altars dedicated to San Sebastiano and San Rocco. Its interior walls were adorned with complexes of "ex voto" paintings. The church has been deconsecrated and the building currently houses the headquarters of the M.I.D.A.C (INTERNATIONAL DYNAMIC MUSEUM OF CONTEMPORARY ART).

=== Church of San Giovanni ===
The foundation of the church dates back to the first half of the 1300s and was initially intended for Benedictine nuns to whom the Dominican friars took over at the end of the 1400s. The church has simple shapes and limited dimensions where there are also frescoes depicting the Nativity and the Madonna del Rosario by Andrea De Magistris from 1558.

=== Church of Santa Maria di Villa Pianiglioli ===
The small church is located in the hamlet of Villa Pianiglioli and boasts an interesting series of sandstone bas-reliefs that particularly animate the facade. You can immediately notice the representation of the Santa Maria to the side of which appears the inscription "RUS PIANI OGLIOLI" from which the toponym Pianiglioli derives. There are also three paintings depicting: San Venanzio; Sant'Eustachio holding the town of Belforte on his left hand; the Sacred Conversation.

=== Church and Monastery of San Lorenzo ===
Previously, it was located behind the town hall (via Cavour), and was erected in 1642 (or 1652), while it was only transferred later, towards the end of the 1800s, to its current position. The monastery was renovated following the 1997 earthquake and was also used for conventual hospitality.

=== Church of San Salvatore ===
The church of San Salvatore was erected or commissioned by "Bartolu de Sebastianu" around the 16th century. The interior paintings have been cleaned up with a coat of lime and only two scenes remain visible: a Christ and a Holy Family. Monsignor Severini, in 1608 said: "simplex et et ruralis ecclesia Sanctissimi Salvatoris in contrata Muretae". Unfortunately, over time, thieves violated the sacredness of the place. Privately owned, visits can be arranged by reservation.

=== Church of Santa Maria d'Antegiano ===
The first news relating to this church dates back to 1476, as other sources of 1421 make no mention of its factory. The church was kept as a place of the Clareni according to what can be read in an act of exchange of 1540. Inside it has two marble slabs, a confessional and an altar, moreover there was kept a canvas with stylistic references that lead back to De Magistris. The first news relating to this church dates back to 1476, as other sources of 1421 make no mention of its factory. The church was kept as a place of the Clareni according to what can be read in an act of exchange of 1540. Inside it has two marble slabs, a confessional and an altar, moreover there was kept a canvas with stylistic references that lead back to De Magistris.

=== Municipal Palace and Civic Tower ===
The town hall of Belforte is made up of two buildings arranged in an "L" shape. The two facades are characterized by as many orders of windows and by a nineteenth-century portico. The seventeenth-century Civic Tower appears from the left body. The palace houses works of great historical interest such as the bell, dating back to the sixteenth century, from the church of San Sebastiano.

=== Palazzo Farroni - Bonfranceschi ===
The elegant palace was built between the second half of the seventeenth and the first half of the eighteenth century. Originally it belonged to the Farroni family then, through the hereditary axis, it passed to the Bonfranceschi family. The entire complex is currently owned by the city and houses a period residence.

=== Vicomandi Palace ===
Rare example of a corner building with a hanging garden, already existing in the year 1766, of which, however, there is no information on the origins. The main facade of the building and the side ones face along the two main streets and the one behind has a lush hanging garden. It retains the typical furnishings of the bourgeois home of the nineteenth century. It has four representative rooms on the main front with painted ceilings with various allegories, including the three halls with arabesques. The family oratory is located near the main hall. The bedrooms are also painted with allegorical and grotesque motifs.

=== Statue of Anselmo Ciappi ===
The statue of Anselmo Ciappi, a well-known citizen of Belfort who died in 1936, is located between the green of the flower beds and plants of Piazza Vittorio Emanuele II. The bronze bust is the work of the sculptor Pettinari from Tolentino. The epigraph engraved on the stele "Anselmo Ciappi, great for science, goodness, love of country" testifies the country's recognition for the merits attributed to it in the scientific, political but above all human field.

=== Roman Gate ===
In medieval times, the village of Belforte was accessed through the arch of Porta Romana which still constitutes the main entrance to the historic center. To its right is the ancient washhouse, also dating back to medieval times.

=== Triumphal Arch ===
It is commonly called the "door for the pope" since it was erected in 1782 on the occasion of the retirement of Pius VI from Vienna. Opposite passes the `Via Regalis Lauretana` which, coming from Assisi, reaches Loreto.

=== Porta Vercungiano ===
It dates back to the sixteenth century, located near the church of San Sebastiano, marking the beginning of the via Lauretana in Belforte del Chienti.

== Crafts ==
Among the most traditional, widespread and active economic activities are artisanal ones, such as the manufacture of leather goods. [4]

== Administration ==
Alessio Vita is the first citizen of Belforte del Chienti. He was voted for by the citizens through a political party called(obiettivo comune) Joint target. This act saw him become the mayor of Belforte del Chienti on the 21 of May 2019, And till date still in office.

== Sport ==
The Belfortese R.Salvatori football team was born from the second category in the marche region.
