= Camporotondo di Fiastrone =

- Comune
- Comune di Camporotondo di Fiastrone
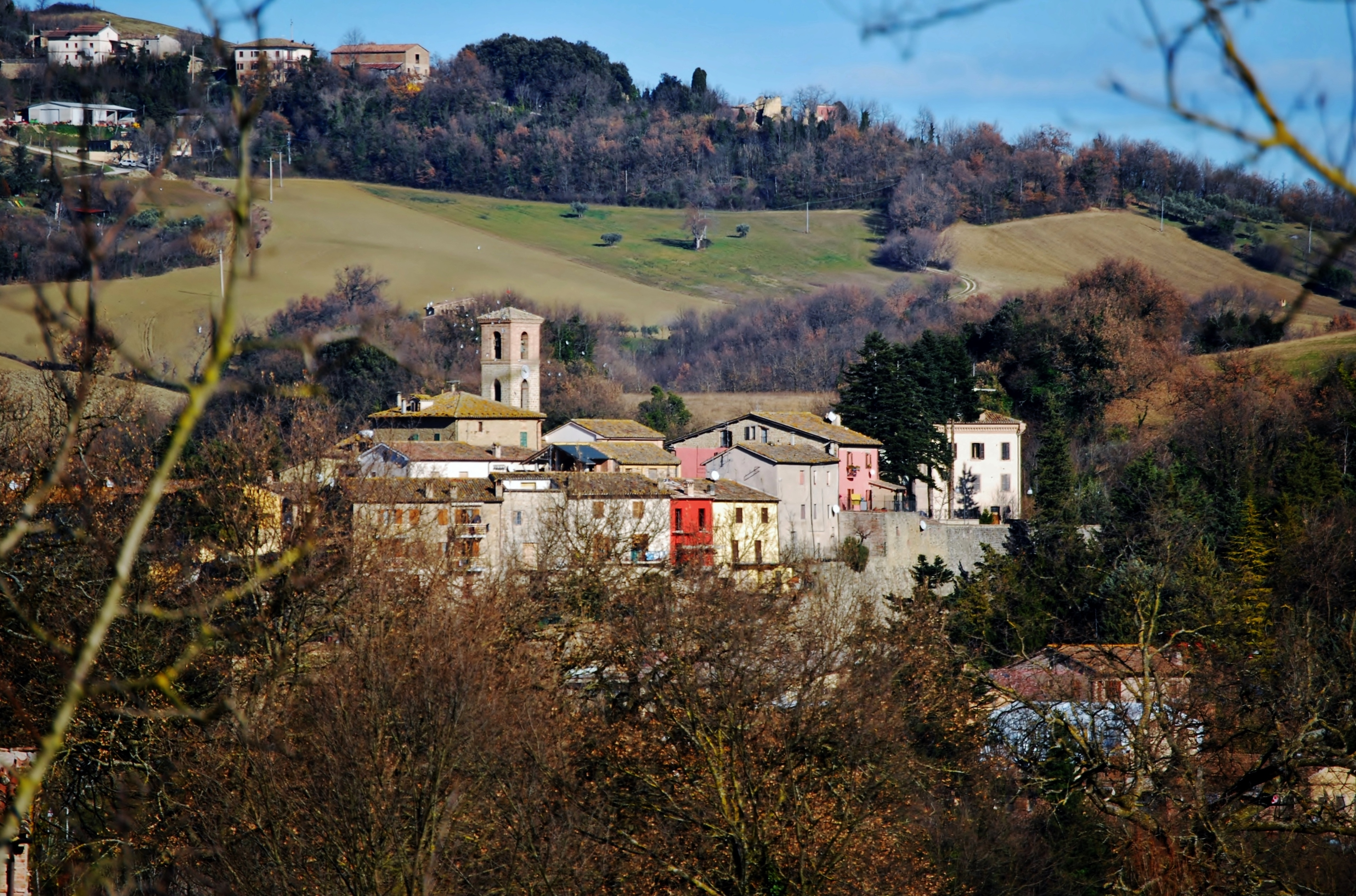

- Coat of arms

- Location within Italy Location within Marche
- Coordinates: 43°8′N 13°16′E
- Country: Italy
- Region: Marche
- Province: Macerata (MC)

Government
  - Mayor: Giorgio Diletti

Area
  - Total: 8.83 km^{2} (3.41 sq mi)
- Elevation: 335 m (1,099 ft)

Population (28 February 2009)
  - Total: 613
  - Density: 69.4/km^{2} (180/sq mi)
- Time zone: UTC+1 (CET)
  - Summer (DST): UTC+2 (CEST)
- Postal code: 62020
- Dialing code: 0733

Camporotondo di Fiastrone is a comune (municipality) of about 580 inhabitants in the Province of Macerata in the Italian region Marche, located about 60 kilometres (37 mi) southwest of Ancona and about 25 kilometres (16 mi) southwest of Macerata.

Camporotondo di Fiastrone borders the following municipalities: Belforte del Chienti, Caldarola, Cessapalombo, San Ginesio, Tolentino.

Just east of the town is the Franciscan Convent of Colfano.
