= Convent of Colfano =

Convent and church in Marche, Italy

Coordinates: 43°07′20.0″N 13°15′21.0″E

The Convento di Colfano of Convento di San Francesco di Colfano is a Franciscan order, Roman Catholic convent and church located in a rural site just off National road 502 (kilometer 66) outside of the town of Camporotondo di Fiastrone, province of Macerata, region of Marche, Italy.

== History ==
Tradition holds the convent was founded by Francis himself. The convent, as typical of many Franciscan convents, was located outside of the walls of the village, about a kilometer of road east of the hill-top town of Camporotondo, in the frazione of Colfano. The name of the neighborhood derives from mount of the Fanum, a rural pagan temple. Near the monastery, the Friars Minor of the convent maintain a hermitage with a Grotto of the Friars.

The rustic stone church of San Francesco associated with the convent has an altarpiece depicting the Virgin of the Devotion (1490) by Nobilis De Luca. It also houses a Crucifixion with the Virgin, Mary Magdalen, St John Evangelist, and St Francis also attributed to Nobilis, and a Holy Family,(1547) signed by Giovanni Andrea de Magistris.
