= Sant'Agostino, San Ginesio =

Roman Catholic church in San Ginesio, Italy

Coordinates: 43°6′27.6″N 13°19′13.14″E

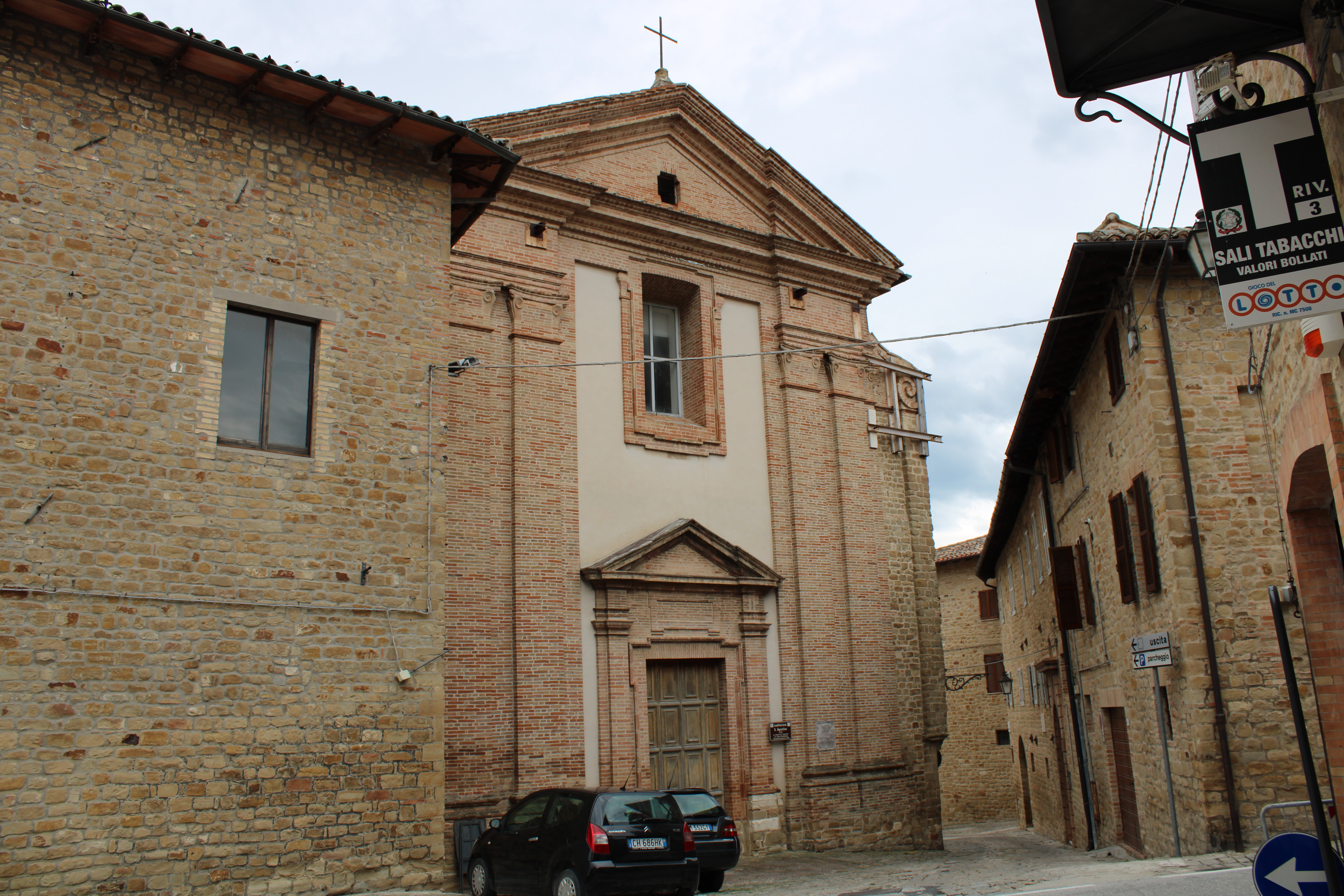

Sant'Agostino is a Roman Catholic church and former monastery located in the town limits of San Ginesio, province of Macerata, in the region of Marche, Italy. The complex for some years included an elementary school, and the church is presently a civic auditorium.

== History ==
Originally built in Romanesque style; the church was rebuilt in 1756 as documented in the entrance portal. It is presently used as a secular auditorium by the community. The former main altarpiece of the church, depicting St Andrew (early 14th-century) and attributed to Nicola da Siena, is now housed in the Museo Civico.

The 13th century cloister of the monastery now houses the Istituto Magistrale and the Liceo Linguistico “A. Gentili”. The well in the center of the courtyard is called the acqua di San Nicola, because the saint was a novice in this convent. The walls still have paintings depicting the life of St Augustine.
