= Cessapalombo =

- Comune
- Comune di Cessapalombo
- Coat of arms

- Location within Italy Location within Marche
- Coordinates: 43°6′N 13°16′E
- Country: Italy
- Region: Marche
- Province: Macerata (MC)
- Frazioni: Monastero, Tribbio, Villa

Government
  - Mayor: Giammario Ottavi

Area
  - Total: 27.7 km^{2} (10.7 sq mi)
- Elevation: 447 m (1,467 ft)

Population (31 December 2010)
  - Total: 533
  - Density: 19.2/km^{2} (49.8/sq mi)
- Demonym: Cessapalombesi
- Time zone: UTC+1 (CET)
  - Summer (DST): UTC+2 (CEST)
- Postal code: 62020
- Dialing code: 0733
- Website: Official website

Cessapalombo is a comune (municipality) in the Province of Macerata in the Italian region Marche, located about 60 kilometres (37 mi) southwest of Ancona and about 25 kilometres (16 mi) southwest of Macerata.

Among the churches in the town are:

- Santa Maria in Insula
- San Giovanni Battista
- Abbazia San Salvatore
