= Santa Maria in Piazza =

Santa Maria in Piazza may refer to:

- Santa Maria in Piazza, Loro Piceno, a church in Loro Piceno, Marche, Italy
- Santa Maria in Piazza, Mogliano, a church in Mogliano, Marche, Italy

== See also ==
- Santa Maria a Piazza
- Santa Maria di Piazza (disambiguation)
