= Santa Maria di Piazza =

Santa Maria di Piazza may refer to:

- Santa Maria di Piazza, Serrapetrona, a church in Serrapetrona, Marche, Italy
- Santa Maria di Piazza, Turin, a church in Turin, Piedmont, Italy

== See also ==
- Santa Maria a Piazza
- Santa Maria in Piazza (disambiguation)
