= Arrone =

- Comune
- Comune di Arrone
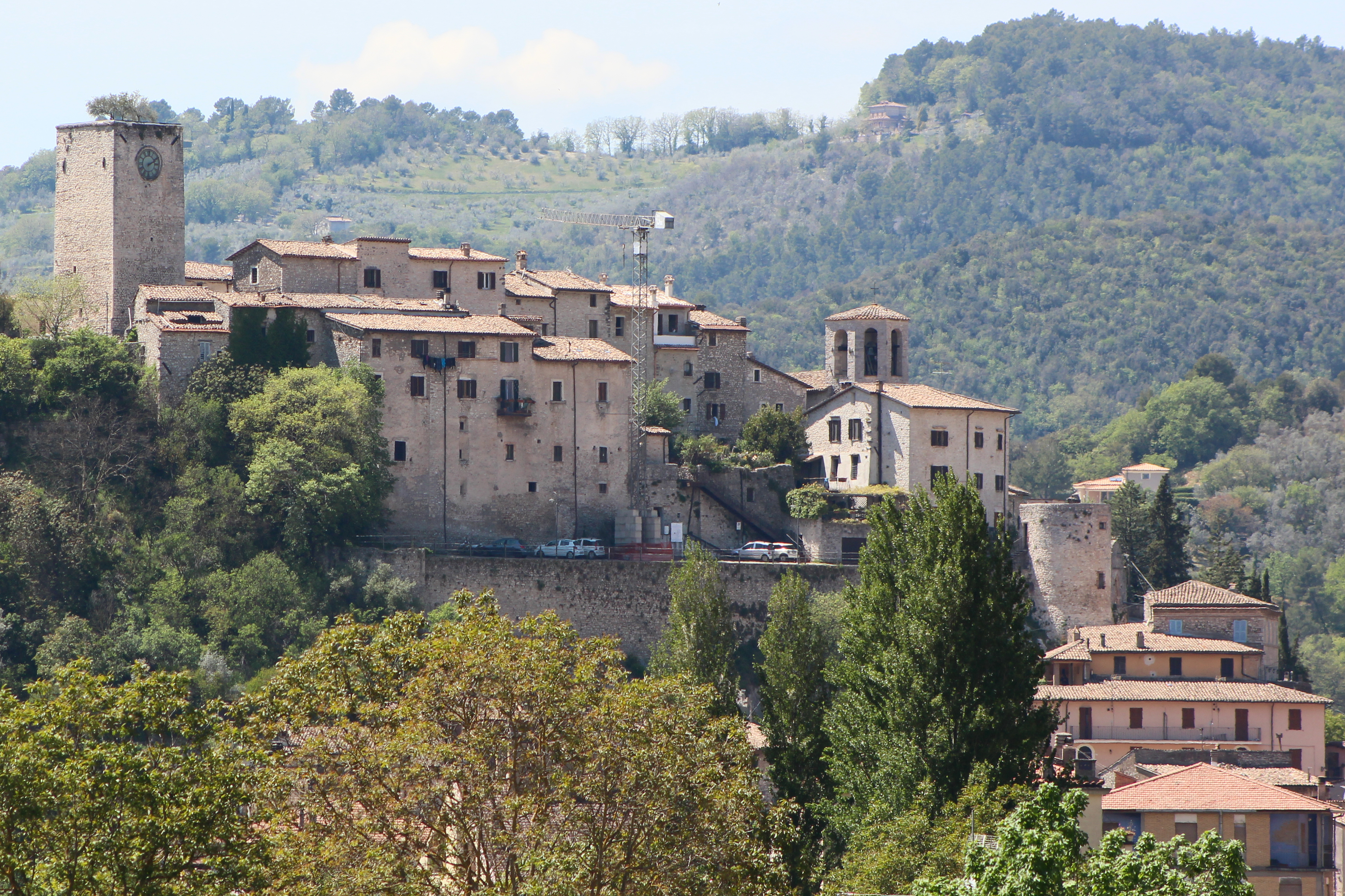
- View of Arrone

- Coat of arms

- Location of Arrone in Italy Arrone (Umbria)
- Coordinates: 42.582836°N 12.769158°E
- Country: Italy
- Region: Umbria
- Province: Terni (TR)

Government
  - Mayor: Fabio Di Gioia

Area
  - Total: 41.04 km^{2} (15.85 sq mi)
- Elevation: 239 m (784 ft)

Population (1 January 2025)
  - Total: 2,493
  - Density: 60.75/km^{2} (157.3/sq mi)
- Demonym: Arronesi
- Time zone: UTC+1 (CET)
  - Summer (DST): UTC+2 (CEST)
- Postal code: 05031
- Dialing code: 0744
- Patron saint: St. John the Baptist
- Saint day: June 24
- Website: Official website

Arrone is a comune (municipality) in the Province of Terni in the Italian region Umbria, located about 70 km southeast of Perugia and about 10 km east of Terni in the Valnerina. It is one of I Borghi più belli d'Italia ("The most beautiful villages of Italy").

== History ==
The settlement of Arrone originated in 880, when a Roman in exile named Arrone is said to have founded a castle there. He became gastald (lord) of the Valnerina, historically also referred to as Giuseppenca after a descendant named Giuseppe II.

From the 9th to the 11th century the Arroni family expanded their power, extending control over surrounding castles.

Submission to Spoleto followed in 1229, when Arrone swore an oath of loyalty. Relations with Spoleto were marked by repeated clashes between the 12th and 14th centuries, alternating with periods of enforced peace. The Arroni family disappeared from the records in 1341, having relocated to Spoleto, after which Arrone passed fully under the authority of the Spoletan community during the 14th century.

Municipal statutes were drafted in 1347 and later renewed in 1542. During the 16th century Arrone remained subject to the Papal States through the authority of Spoleto.

Local history in the 17th and 18th centuries was largely tied to that of the surrounding district, with minor disputes over taxation with Spoleto. In 1799 the town was sacked by French forces for having aided insurgents.

During the Napoleonic period Arrone was included in the Department of Trasimeno, within the district of Spoleto and the canton of Terni. The Restoration brought a return to the pre-Napoleonic administrative system. The events of the Roman Republic had limited impact locally, with a provisional municipal commission operating between 1849 and the 1850s.

In 1860 Arrone voted unanimously for annexation to the Kingdom of Sardinia.

In 1895 Arrone had a population of 2,202 inhabitants.

== Geography ==
Arrone is located in the Valnerina, about 11 kilometres (6.8 mi) from Terni. Its territory is mountainous and largely covered with woodland.

The town lies in a gently sloping valley in a relatively temperate climate, where winds from the east and west prevail. The river Nera flows nearby, passing close to the walls of the castle and crossed by a masonry bridge.

The area includes a wooded tract known as Licineto located about 300 metres (980 ft) from the town. At a distance of 2 miles (3.2 km) there is a ferruginous spring known as Fonte dell'Acqua Santa. Several streams run through the fertile territory and join the so-called Forma di Mezzo, which passes near the settlement and flows into the Nera.

Arrone consists of two residential nuclei. The oldest, known as the Terra, corresponds to the feudal castle of the Arroni family and stands on the top of the hill. A later nucleus, called Santa Maria, developed through Porta San Giovanni outside the medieval center and takes its name from the collegiate church of Santa Maria Assunta around which it was built.

=== Subdivisions ===
The municipality includes the localities of Arrone, Buonacquisto, Casteldilago, Castiglioni, Colle Alvano, Colle Sant'Angelo, Palombare, Rosciano, Vallecupa, Vallefredda, Valleludra.

In 2021, 299 people lived in rural dispersed dwellings not assigned to any named locality. At the time, the most populous localities were Arrone proper (1,349), and Casteldilago (441).

== Economy ==
The local economy in the 19th century was based on agriculture, with production of oil, wine, and other crops. There was also a fulling mill with dye works and a facility for processing olive pomace.

Sports tourism is well developed in Arrone, with activities connected to water sports such as rowing, rafting, and canyoning, as well as free climbing on natural rock faces.

== Religion and culture ==
The feast of the patron saint, Saint John the Baptist, is celebrated on 24 June.

=== Santa Maria Assunta ===
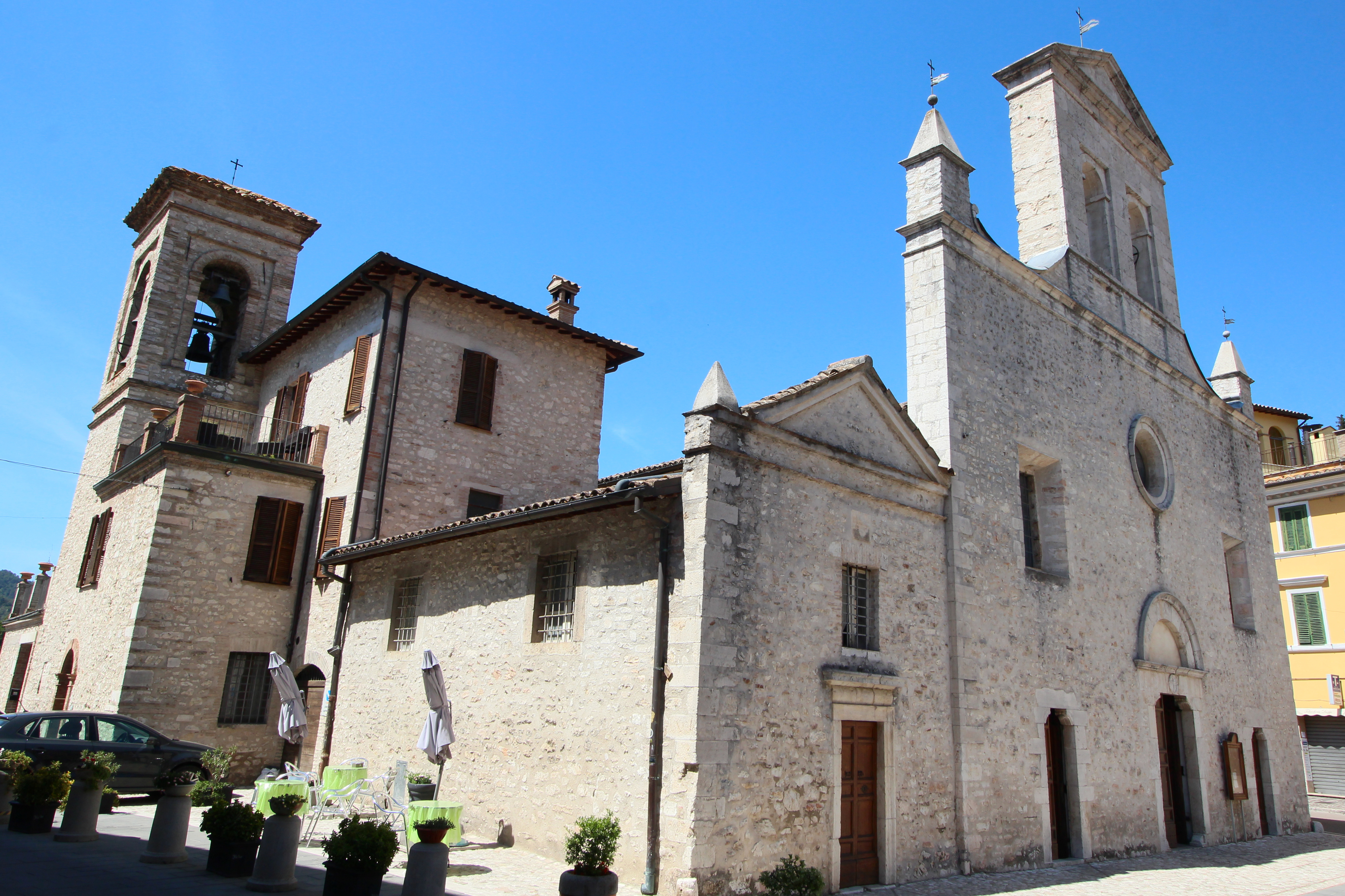
Church of Santa Maria Assunta

The parish church of Santa Maria Assunta stands in the newer district of Santa Maria, which developed outside the medieval nucleus of Arrone centered on the castle known as the Terra. The building has a four-pitched façade with a bell gable and three portals; the central portal is dated 1493 and preserves in its lunette a fresco of the Madonna and the angels. The interior has three naves ending in three apses and is decorated with frescoes mostly from the 17th century. The church also preserves the predella belonging to a triptych by the Maestro di Arrone dated 1487.

The church was built in the 15th century in worked stone, though later altered by restorations. The baptismal font, in carved limestone in Baroque style, dates to the 16th century. The church contains paintings attributed to the school of Gherardo da Rieti, as well as works influenced by the Zuccari and by Lo Spagna. Other decorations include glazed terracottas of the 16th century and fresco cycles depicting scenes from the life of the Virgin and of Christ, including an imitation of a composition by Filippo Lippi in the cathedral of Spoleto. The church has canvases by Giuseppe Bastiani, Francesco Cozza, Vincenzo Tamagni, Giovanni di Pietro da Spoleto, and Jacopo Siculo.

=== San Giovanni Evangelista ===
The church of San Giovanni Evangelista has a façade with a decorated portal and a circular window in red limestone, dating to the late 14th century. Its interior consists of a single nave with a wooden roof and a polygonal apse with ribbed vaulting. Frescoes on the walls date back to at least 1480 and include scenes such as the Evangelists, the Virgin and Child, episodes from the life of Saint John the Baptist, and other sacred figures. Above the altar is a tempera triptych depicting the Virgin, Christ, and Saint Anthony Abbot, bearing a 14th-century date.

=== San Giovanni Battista ===
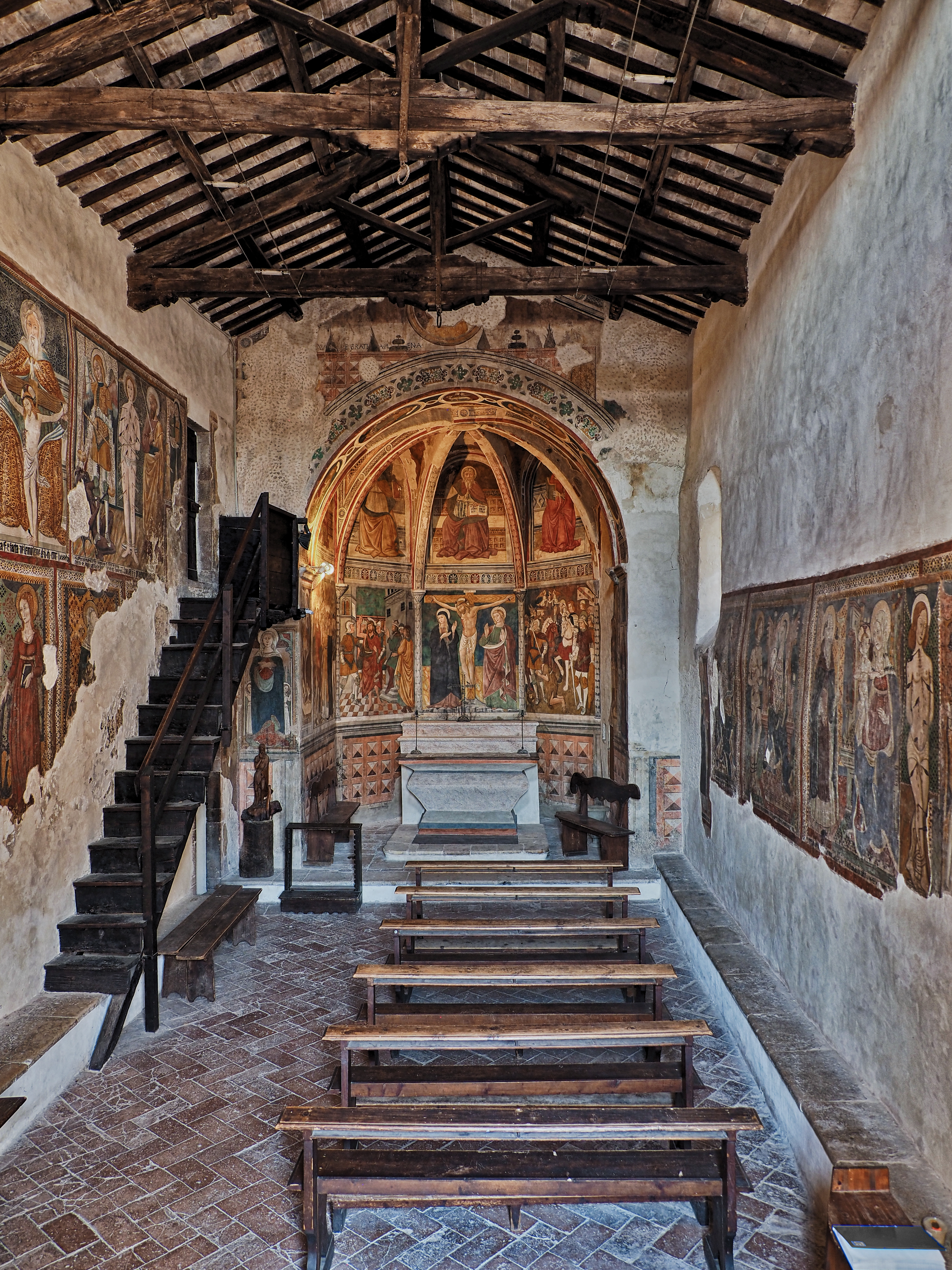
Interior of San Giovanni Battista, featuring a trussed roof and continuous fresco registers along the side walls

The church of San Giovanni Battista is a Gothic construction of the 13th–14th centuries, with a square tower and a polygonal apse. The interior has a single nave with a wooden roof supported by three trusses. The walls are painted with figures of saints commissioned by families of Arrone as votive images for favors received. The painter to whom these works, including the apse frescoes, are attributed is conventionally known as the Maestro del trittico di Arrone.

The church of San Giovanni Battista preserves three panel paintings executed in 1487 by Bernardino Campilli of Spoleto.

=== Santa Maria della Quercia ===
Among the religious buildings, the chapel of Santa Maria della Quercia preserves a tempera panel representing the Marriage of the Virgin, attributed to a school recalling that of Perugino.

=== Castle La Terra ===
Castle La Terra corresponds to the feudal castle of the Arroni family, built on the summit of the hill. It is enclosed by a defensive wall articulated with circular bastions, and is crossed by a main street leading to the square where the church of San Giovanni Battista stands.

=== Other heritage sites ===
Arrone lies within the natural setting of the Parco Fluviale del Nera and offers a permanent educational workshop through guided activities, including hiking itineraries and trekking routes.

== Notable people ==
The Arroni family of Spoleto is traditionally associated with the foundation of the settlement.

Among those born in Arrone is Guido Balzarini, a fencer who won a gold medal in the team sabre event at the 1924 Summer Olympics in Paris.
