= San Francesco, Loro Piceno =

Roman Catholic church in Marche, Italy

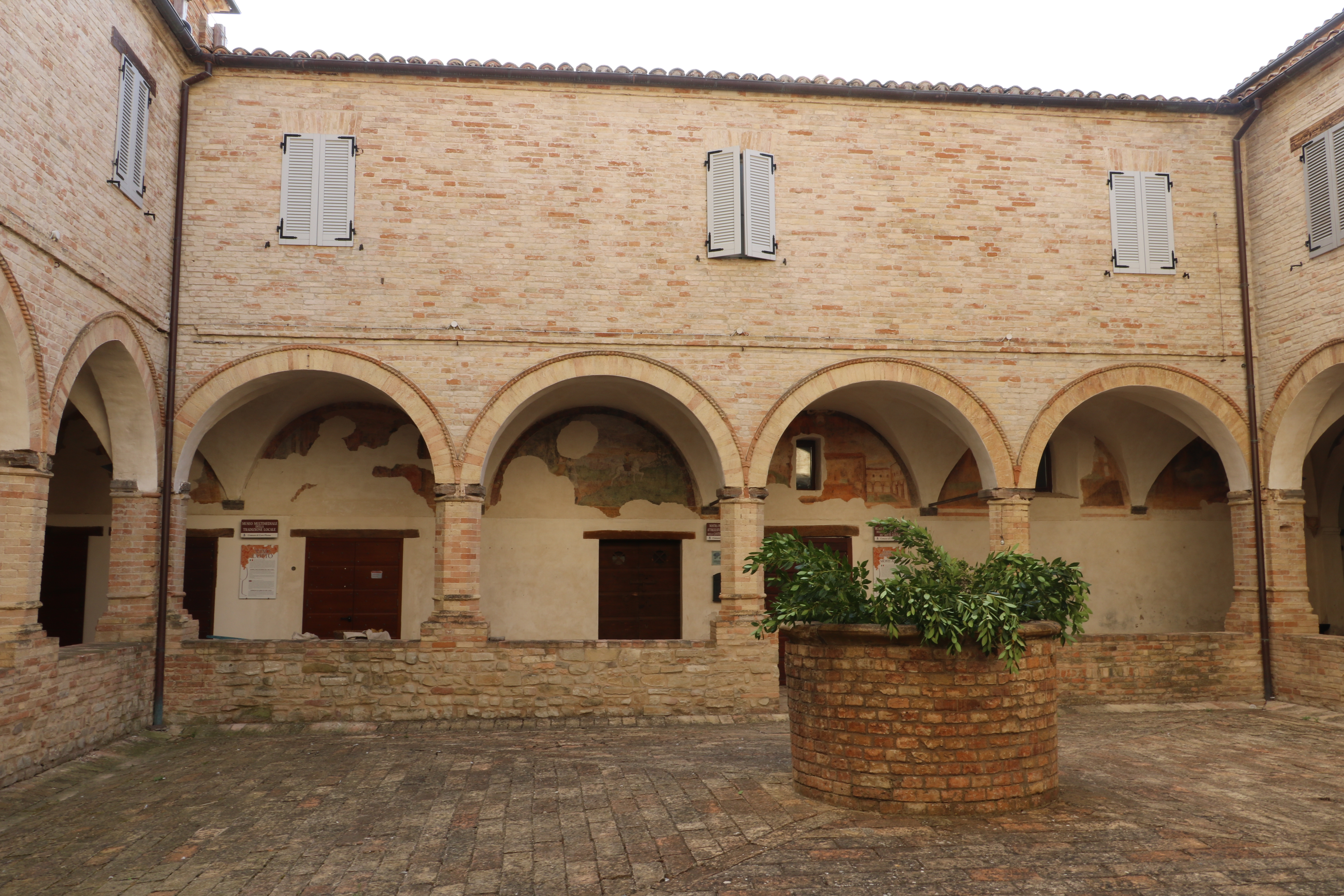

Location
- Interactive map of San Francesco, Loro Piceno
- Coordinates: 43.166932°N 13.415383°E

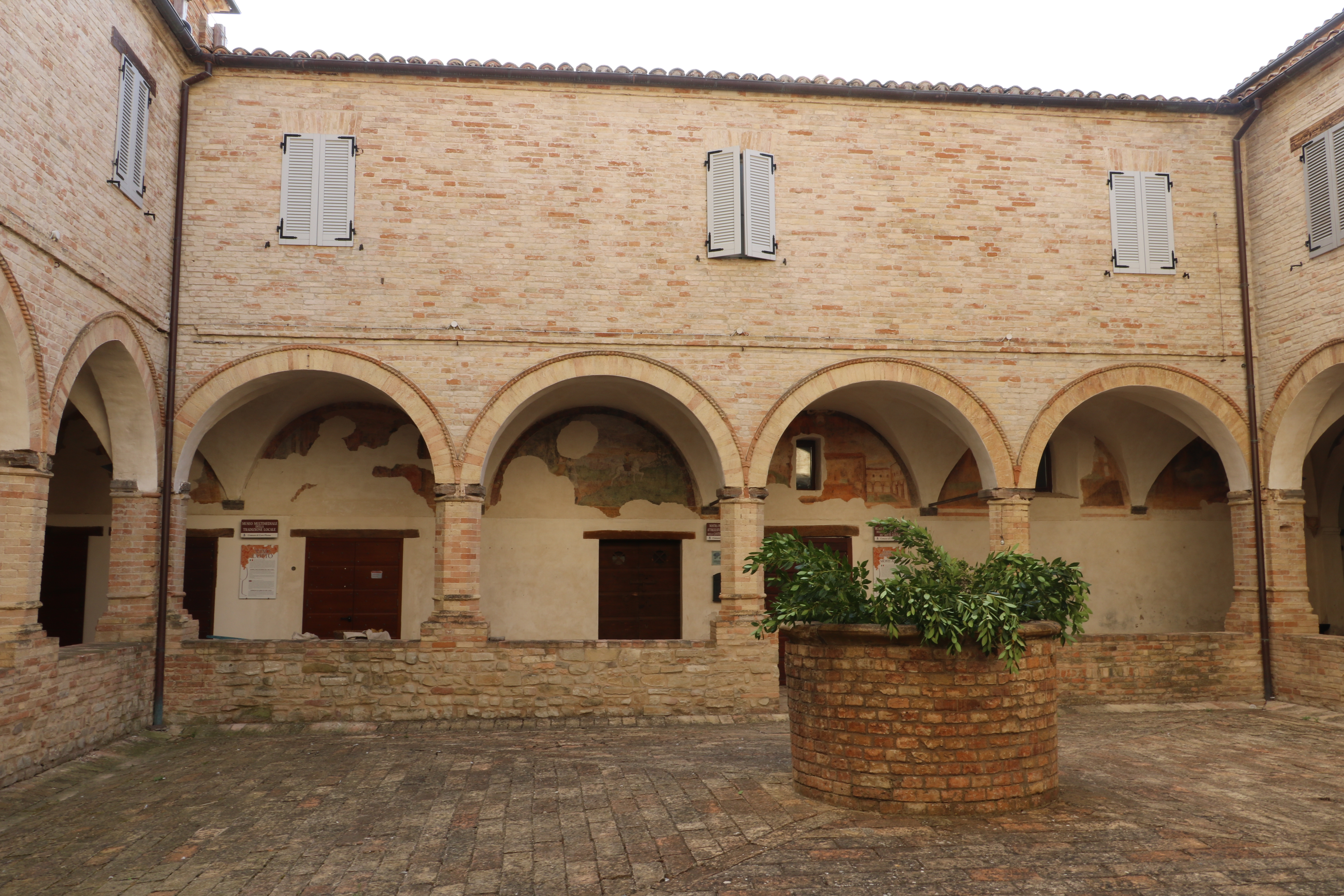

San Francesco is a Baroque-style Roman Catholic church located in the town of Loro Piceno, province of Macerata, in the region of Marche, Italy.

== History ==
The Franciscans arrived to Loro Piceno by 1362, and likely soon after founded a monastery and adjacent church. The latter was consecrated in 1372. The monastery was suppressed only by the Napoleonic invasion, and even afterward some five monks returned after the complex was reassigned to the order after the restoration of Papal government. By then much of the convent became used for other activities including a school. The sacristy had been used in the 18th century as a town archive.

Between the seventeenth and nineteenth century, the total number altars inside the church was reduced to five. In 1793, the wooden choir stalls were moved. The conterfacade held an organ built by Gaetano Callido. The front of the nave once had wooden benches reserved for the nobility of the town; these were moved to the council chamber. Also lost from the church is a 19th-century silver bas-relief designed by sculptor Luigi Fontana of Montesampietrangeli; the bas relief had been made as a votive offering to the Virgin for an event, interpreted as miraculous, occurring in October 1858, when during the recitation of the Rosary, lightning struck the church, but left all the parishioners inside unharmed. In 1828 Luigi Silvestri built the chapel of the Santissimo Crocifisso, to display a copy of the Crucifix of Lanciano. The church underwent a major restoration in 1956–1958.

The church still maintains rich collections of paintings. In houses on one of the altars a wooden Madonna of the Rosary (1680), attributed to Sebastiano Sebastiani. In the lateral altars are paintings depicting:

- The Apparition of the Virgin to the Blessed Liberato during his illness
- The Temptation of St Anthony Abott
- St. Anthony of Padua (1771) by Filippo de Conti
- The Ecstasy of St Joseph of Cupertino
- A Madonna of Loreto
- The Blessed Liberato praying with his companions Umile and Pacifico (1924) derived from the Gabinetto del Sindaco nel Palazzo Municipale.

The main altarpiece depicts a Madonna del Rosario (Madonna of the Rosary), painted in 1581–1590, and attributed to Giuseppe Bastiani of Macerata, who often painted mannerist, provincial devotional subjects, and a pupil of Gaspare Gasparini and follower of the Zuccari. The work was commissioned by the Confraternity of the Rosary, founded in 1573, and officiating at an altar in this church. The painting has a complex iconography: it contains a central scene and is garlanded around the frame with fifteen scenes representing the Mysteries of the Rosary.

The central scene depicts and enthroned Madonna and child Jesus with angels: nearest to them, the Madonna passes St Dominic the rosary, while the Child Jesus gives St Francis a red cross. These two saints are flanked in the central panel includes the next most prominent Dominican and Franciscan male and female saints: respectively, standing, St Peter Martyr and St Anthony of Padua; and kneeling, St Catherine of Siena and St Clare of Assisi. The canvas is also crowded below with both religious and secular leaders showing devotion to the institutions of the rosary and cross. Some identify among them Pope Pius V, a former Dominican friar; Cardinal Carlo Bonelli, Pius' nephew; John of Austria, the Spanish admiral for King Philip II of Spain. All were leaders in forming coalition that checked the Ottoman navy in the Battle of Lepanto. Pope Pius V had called for prayers of the Rosary prior to the battle, and afterward declared the Feast of Our Lady of the Rosary is on October 7, would be held on the anniversary of the 1571 battle. The fifteen scenes are represented by the five Joyful (gaudiosi), five Sorrowful (dolorosi), and five Glorious (gloriosi) Mysteries.
