= Loro Piceno =

- Comune
- Comune di Loro Piceno
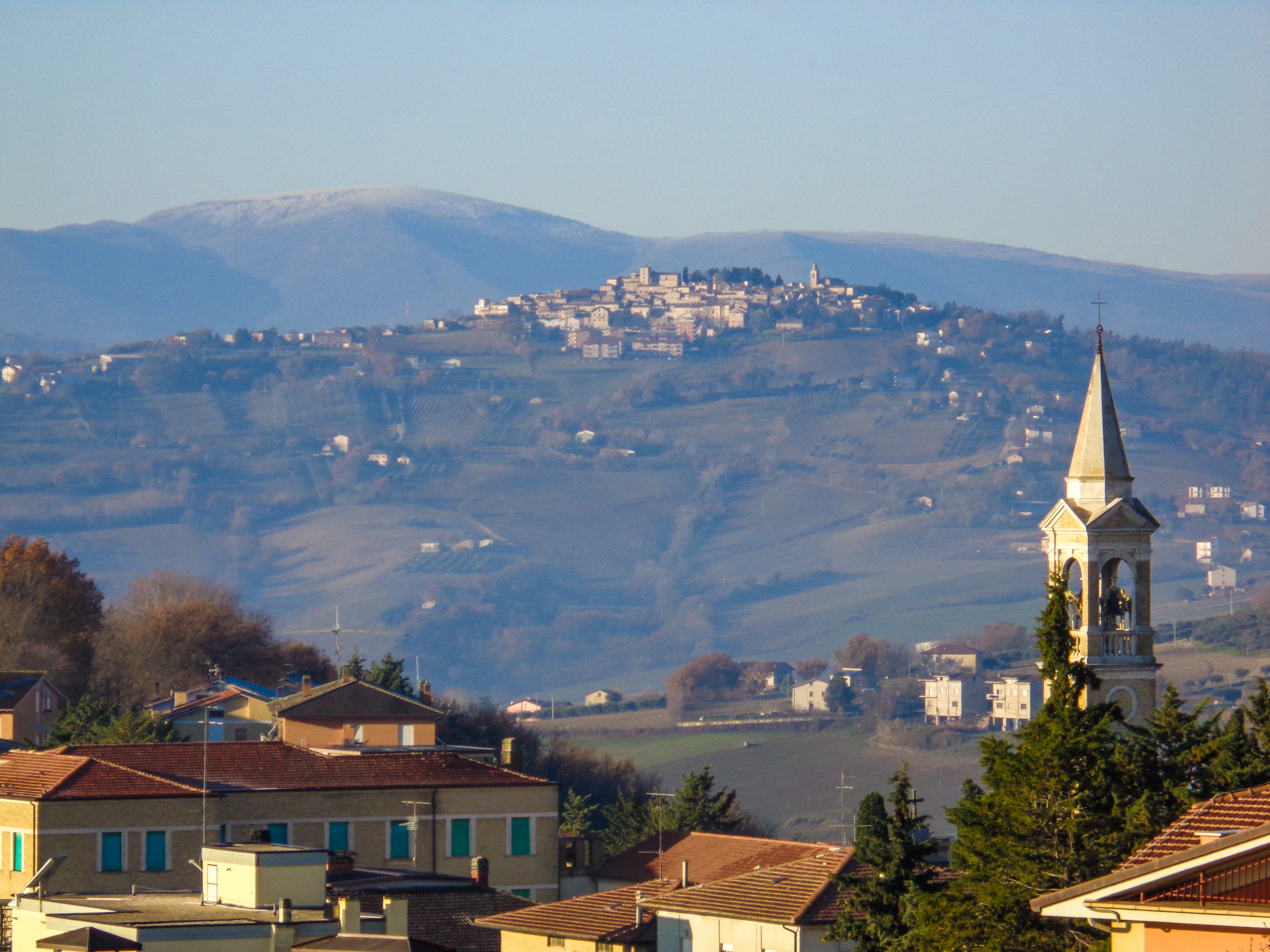

- Coat of arms

- Location within Italy Location within Marche
- Coordinates: 43°10′N 13°25′E
- Country: Italy
- Region: Marche
- Province: Macerata (MC)
- Frazioni: San Valentino, Borgo San Lorenzo, Varco

Government
  - Mayor: Robertino Paoloni

Area
  - Total: 32.5 km^{2} (12.5 sq mi)
- Elevation: 436 m (1,430 ft)

Population (31 August 2015)
  - Total: 2,393
  - Density: 73.6/km^{2} (191/sq mi)
- Demonym: Loresi
- Time zone: UTC+1 (CET)
  - Summer (DST): UTC+2 (CEST)
- Postal code: 62020
- Dialing code: 0733
- Patron saint: St. Liberatus and St. George
- Saint day: August 2 and April 23
- Website: Official website

Loro Piceno is a comune (municipality) in the Province of Macerata in the Italian region Marche, located about 50 kilometres (31 mi) south of Ancona and about 15 kilometres (9 mi) south of Macerata on a hill near the Fiastra stream.

It is a medieval centre with a castle (Castello Brunforte) and churches, some of which are:

- Santa Maria delle Grazie, a baroque church;
- San Francesco, a gothic church;
- Sant'Antonio di Padova, a 16th century capuchin church;
- Santa Maria in Piazza.
