= Chiesa del Rosario, Pievebovigliana =

Roman Catholic church in Marche, Italy

Coordinates: 43°03′49″N 13°05′00″E

The Chiesa del Rosario or Rosary church is a Baroque-style, Roman Catholic parish church located on Via Roma #53 in the town of Pievebovigliana, province of Macerata, region of Marche, Italy. It is located in the northwest corner of the olde town.

== History ==
The church is an unremarkable single nave church, faced in white stucco, erected in the 17th century. The main altar frame however is flanked by gilded Solomonic and Corinthian columns, and carved figures. The main altarpiece depicts the Madonna with Child with Angels and Saints Anne, John the Baptist and Carlo Borromeo (after 1765) attributed to Domenico Luigi Valeri. The side altars have canvases depicting an Adoration of the Shepherds and a Madonna of the Rosary.
