= Serrapetrona =

- Comune
- Comune di Serrapetrona
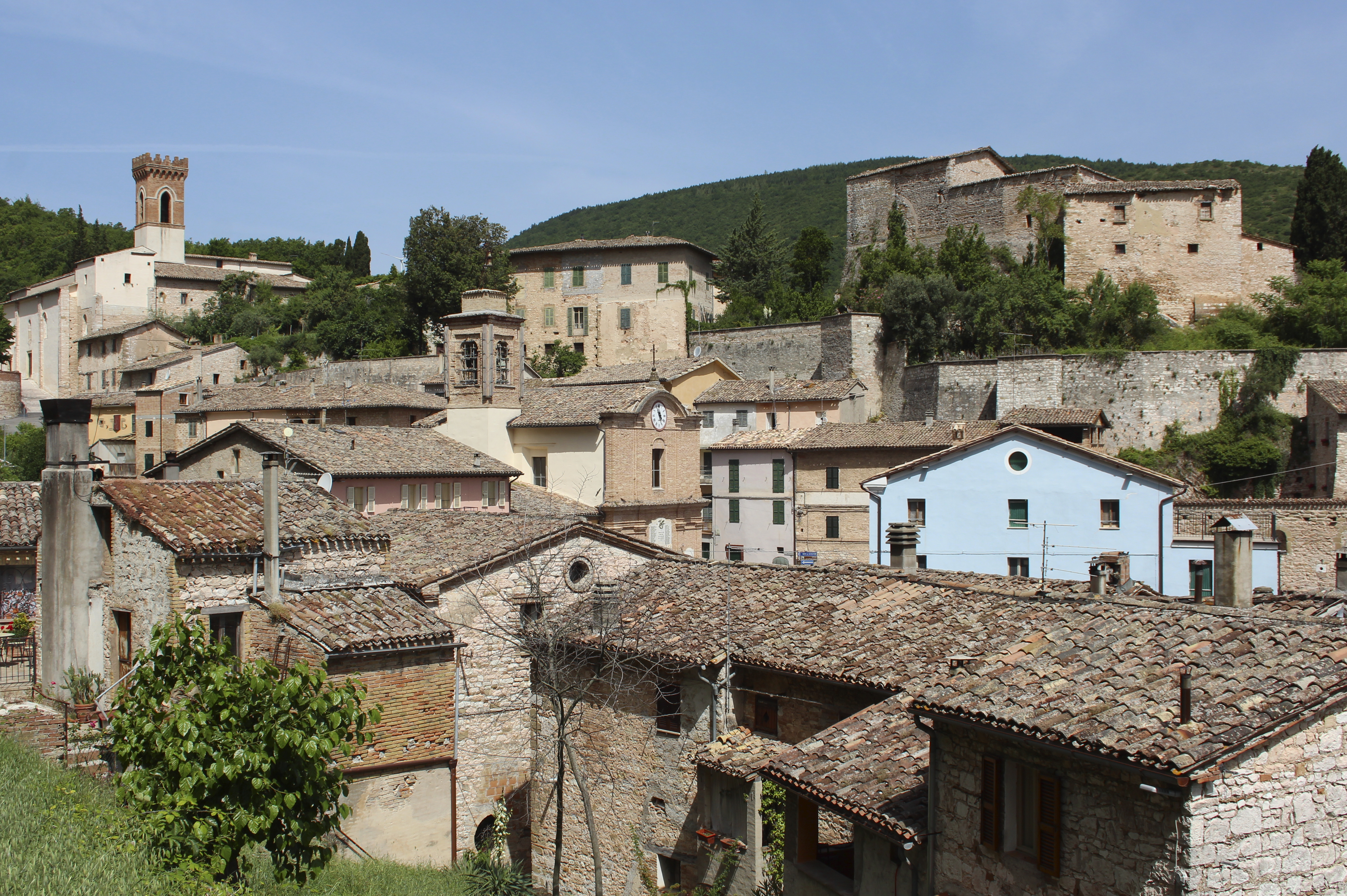
- Panorama of Serrapetrona.

- Coat of arms

- Location within Italy Location within Marche
- Coordinates: 43°11′N 13°11′E
- Country: Italy
- Region: Marche
- Province: Macerata (MC)
- Frazioni: Borgiano, Castel San Venanzo

Government
  - Mayor: Silvia Pinzi

Area
  - Total: 37.6 km^{2} (14.5 sq mi)
- Elevation: 474 m (1,555 ft)

Population (30 June 2011)
  - Total: 1,012
  - Density: 26.9/km^{2} (69.7/sq mi)
- Demonym: Serrapetronesi
- Time zone: UTC+1 (CET)
  - Summer (DST): UTC+2 (CEST)
- Postal code: 62020
- Dialing code: 0733
- Patron saint: St. Clement
- Website: Official website

Serrapetrona is a comune (municipality) in the province of Macerata in the Italian region Marche, located about 60 kilometres (37 mi) southwest of Ancona and about 25 kilometres (16 mi) southwest of Macerata.

Serrapetrona borders the following municipalities: Belforte del Chienti, Caldarola, Camerino, Castelraimondo, San Severino Marche, Tolentino.

The church of Santa Maria is located in the square Piazza Santa Maria.

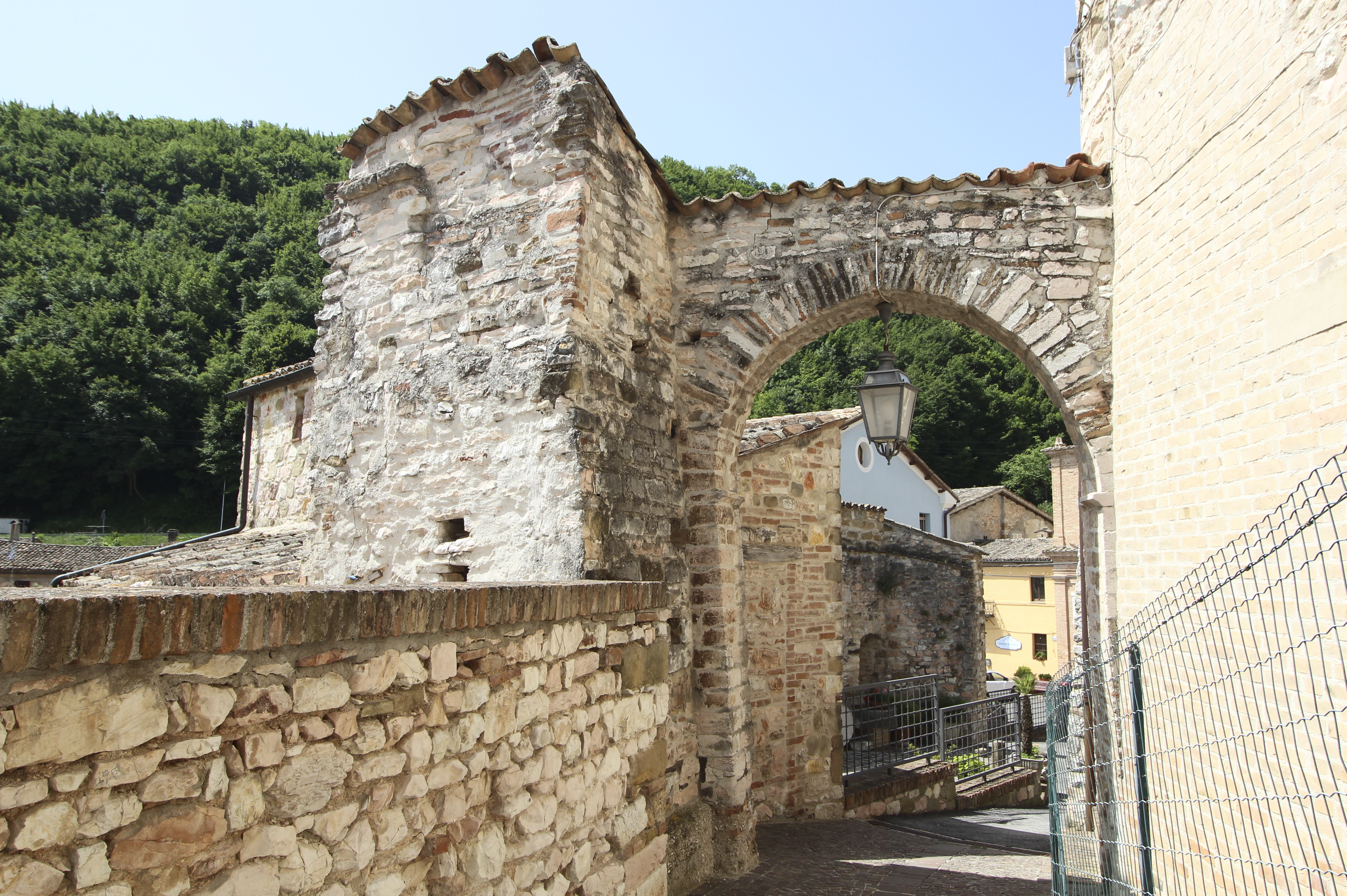
Defensive gate

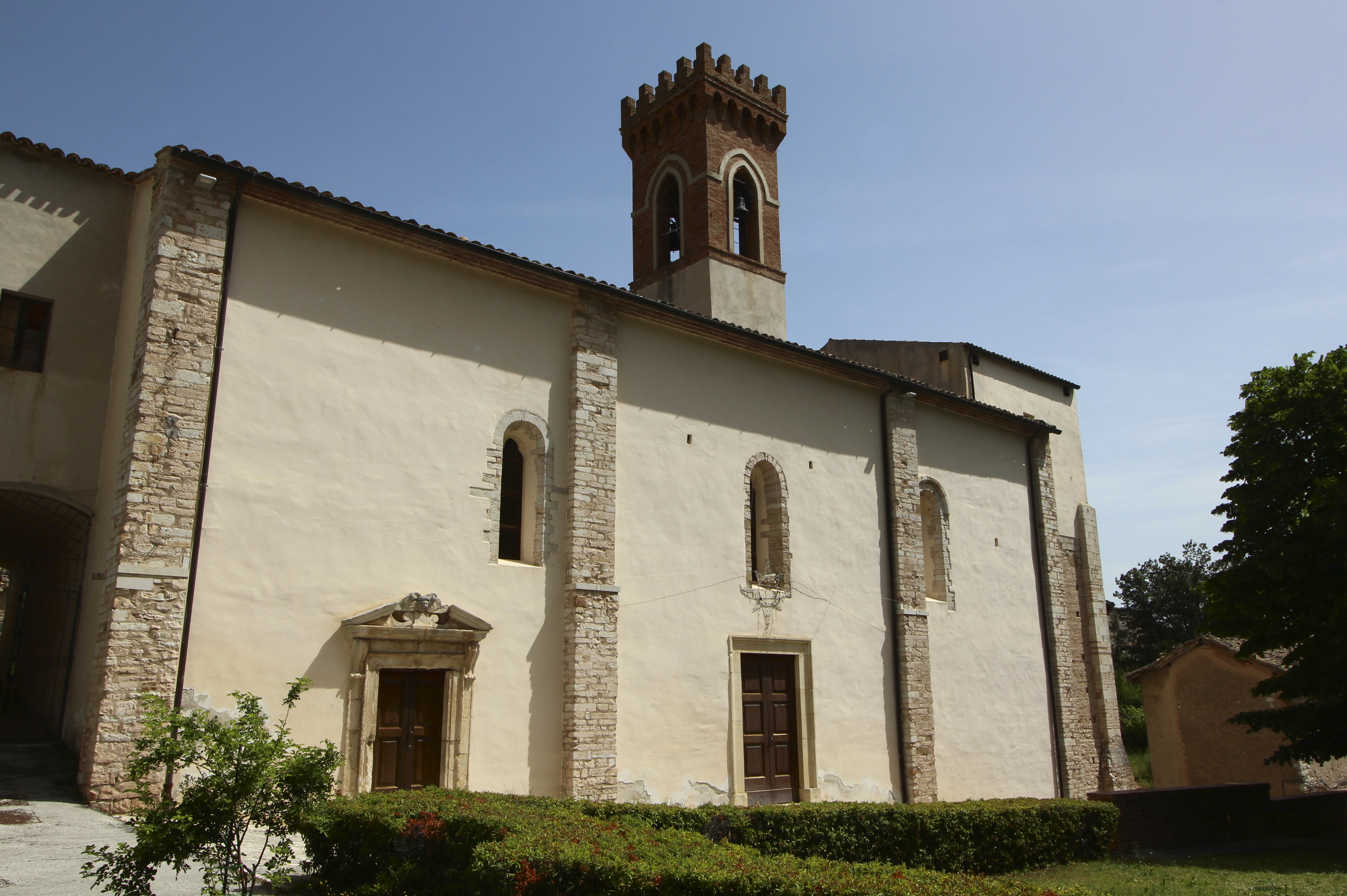
The church San Francesco

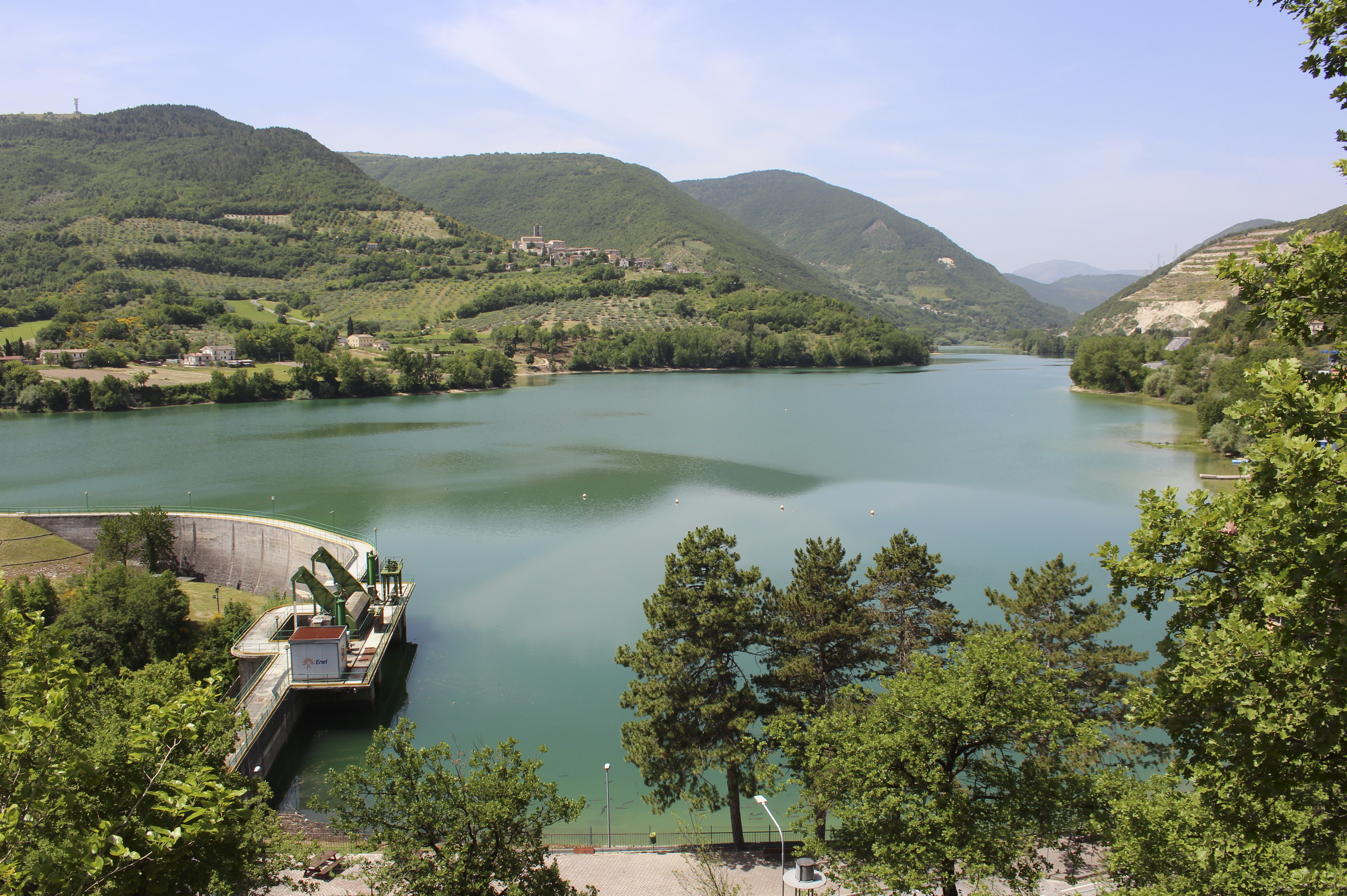
The Lake Lago di Caccamo

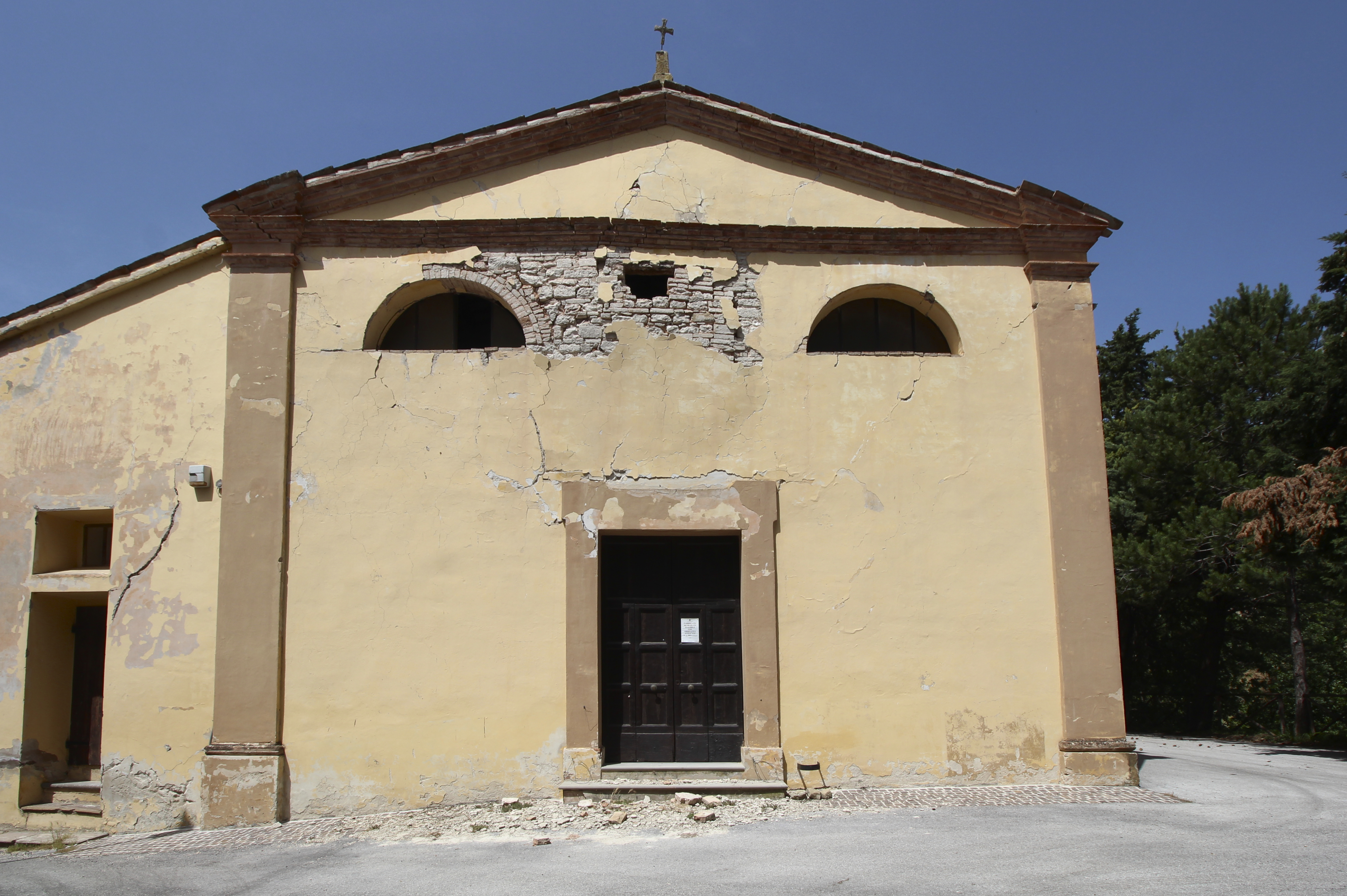
The church San Paolo in Borgiano
