= Buonacquisto =

Locality in Arrone, Umbria, Italy

Coordinates: 42°32′51″N 12°48′31″E

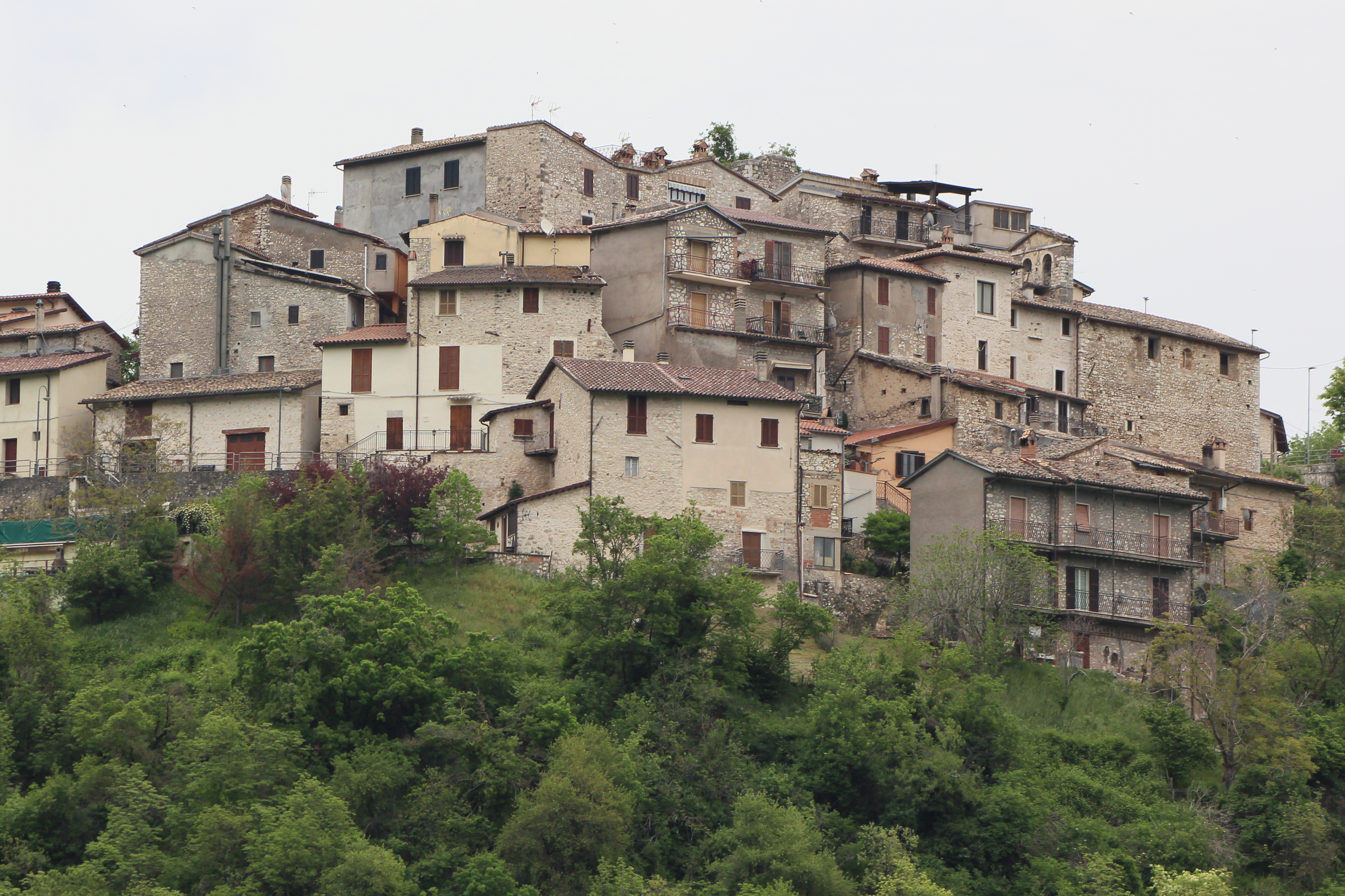
View of Buonacquisto

Buonacquisto is a locality in the municipality of Arrone, in Umbria, central Italy. It lies at an elevation of about 692 metres (2,270 ft) and has 52 inhabitants as of 31 December 2021.

Historically, it was an independent community and later an appodiato of Arrone, with medieval origins linked to the fortified network of castles in the Nera valley.

== History ==
Buonacquisto is traditionally said to have been founded in 880 by Berardo di Attone II, a Roman nobleman in exile and descendant of Lupone. The castle was built and fortified at the end of the 9th century during the Saracen invasions, and remained under the control of the Attoni or Arroni family for several centuries.

According to Ferrante Della Marra, Buonacquisto was among the possessions of the Conti di Luco (later known as the Conti di Piediluco), a lineage established in the late 9th century. Berardo, a member of this family, is recorded as lord of Luco, Piediluco, Buonacquisto and other places, and his descendants are mentioned in documents of the late 11th century.

Ludovico Jacobilli reports that Buonacquisto was part of the so-called "Terra Berardesca", a group of castles and lands assigned to Berardo, son of Count Attone II of Arrone, in the late 9th century. Along with other nearby fortifications, Buonacquisto is listed among the possessions attributed to this lineage.

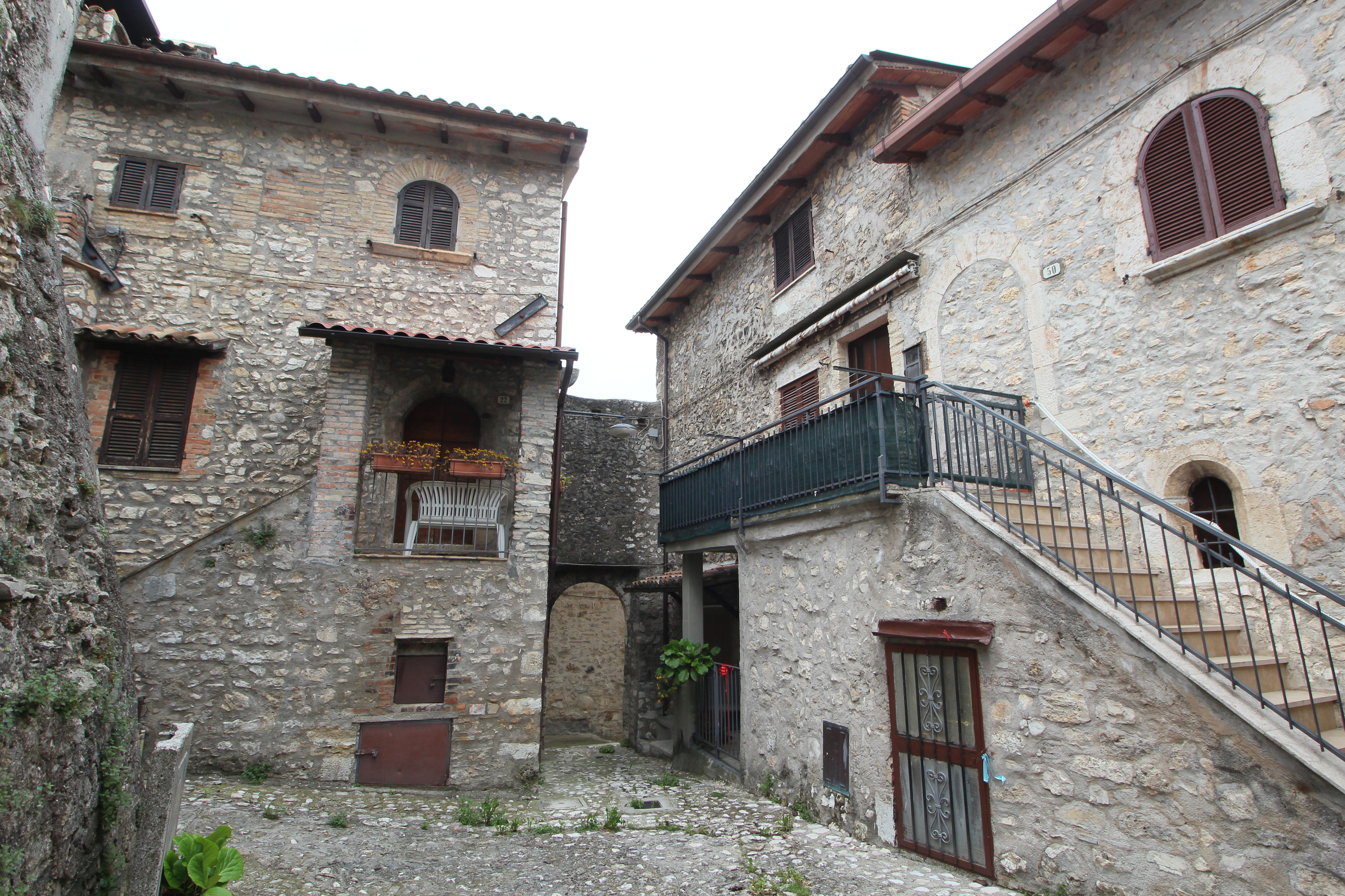
Houses in Buonacquisto

In 1261 Buonacquisto is listed among the castles subject to Spoleto, and for this reason it was attacked by the people of Rieti, then at war with Spoleto. In 1347 the locality passed under the control of the Comune of Spoleto. In 1405 Francesca, widow of Chiaromonte, lord of the castle, donated it to Spoleto, which stationed a garrison there in 1411 during the war of Ladislaus of Naples against the city.

According to Adone Palmieri, the name "Buonacquisto" (literally "good purchase") was thought to have been given ironically by the Spoletini, who conquered the settlement during the civil wars. Some authors believed that the original name was "Melaci", referring to a nearby locality about half a mile away, where the ruins of an ancient castle known as "le Casaline" were still visible.

In 1463 Spoleto consolidated its authority over Buonacquisto, though shortly afterwards, in 1490, the castle no longer appeared in the lists of the Spoletine district. In 1519, during the pontificate of Leo X, the community of Buonacquisto drew up its own statutes, marking a renewed phase of local self-organization.

At the end of the 18th century, during the Roman Republic, Buonacquisto was included in the Canton of Terni within the Department of Clitunno. In 1799 Buonacquisto is mentioned among the places placed under the governorship of Paolo Arcangeli of Arrone, following the reconquest of the area during the conflicts with the French Republic.

== Geography ==
The settlement stands on a hill with a wide horizon and measures about a quarter of a mile in extent. Nearby is a large fruit-bearing wood called Monte di San Nicola, and the nearest stream, known as la Forma, flows into Lake Piediluco.

== Demographics ==
In 1701 the population of Buonacquisto was recorded as 187 inhabitants, a figure that increased to 231 by 1782.

In the 1853 census Buonacquisto counted 55 families and 55 houses and 291 inhabitants, with 100 living in the main settlement and 191 in rural dwellings. Annual marriages numbered two or three, with about ten deaths, matching the number of births.

According to the 1911 census Buonacquisto had 73 families and 284 residents. Of these, 130 lived in the main settlement and 154 in scattered dwellings.

== Government ==
In 1519, the men of the community compiled the Statuta castri Bonacquisti, a collection of laws regulating the governance of the settlement. The statutes were divided into books covering administration, civil matters, criminal matters, extraordinary provisions, and damages. They were subject to approval by the Priors of Spoleto.

Over time, the community held general assemblies (arenghe generali), such as those recorded in 1553, 1554 and 1569, which issued reforms to the statutes. Approvals and reforms continued to be registered up to 1785, showing the long duration of Bonacquisto’s communal organization within the jurisdiction of Spoleto.

Under Napoleonic administration it became part of the Department of Trasimeno, in the district of Spoleto and the Canton of Terni.

Following the Restoration, in 1817, Buonacquisto was suppressed as an independent comune by a papal motu proprio aimed at reducing the number of small municipalities. Together with Casteldilago and Polino, it was aggregated to Arrone as an appodiato. It nevertheless retained a mayor and limited autonomy, with council meetings held in Arrone and two representatives assigned for each appodiato.

With the unification of Italy Buonacquisto lost its autonomy and became a frazione of the municipality of Arrone.

== Economy ==
In 1857 the population was said to be almost entirely engaged in agriculture. The cultivated land amounted to 708 rubbia (about 1,308 hectares; 3,230 acres), reportedly sufficient to meet local needs. The climate was considered healthy, drinking water was available at the entrance to the village, and the community maintained a monte frumentario (grain reserve).

In an 1858 survey of measurement systems in the province of Spoleto, Buonacquisto is listed as following entirely the system of Terni.

=== Mining ===
In the early 20th century a lignite mine was active at Buonacquisto. Mining work began in 1919 and continued through underground galleries and open-air excavations, with developments including transport systems to connect the site with the provincial road to Piediluco.

The lignite mine of Buonacquisto employed about 120 workers, including local inhabitants and specialized laborers from the Marche, particularly Ancona. The mine supplied the industries of Terni and the furnaces of Briziarelli and Tacconi through the station at Piediluco, and formed part of a wider industrial system that also involved the territories of Piediluco, Arrone and Labro. The site remained in operation until 1958.

== Religion ==
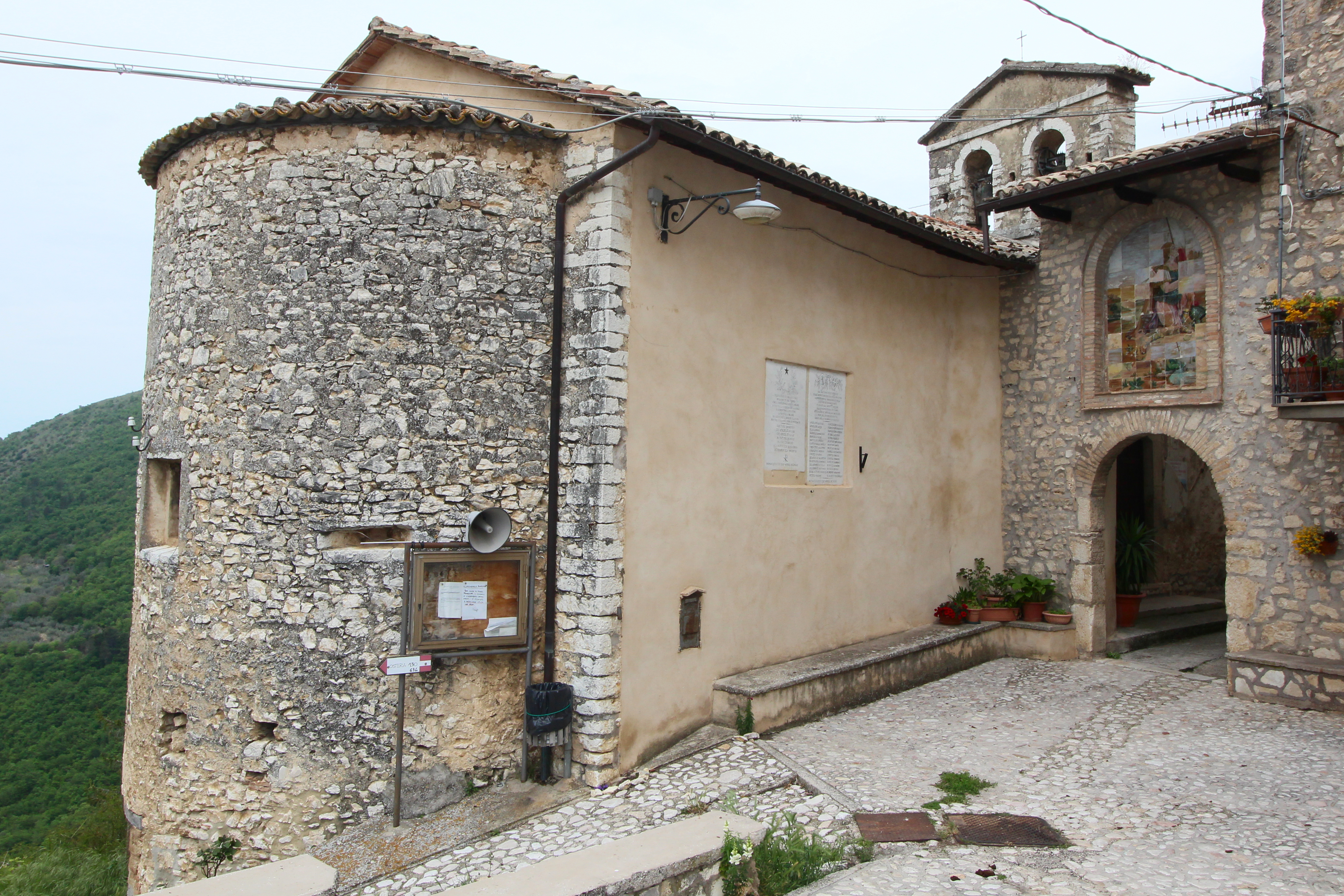
Church of Santa Maria Maddalena

In the mid-19th century, the parish church was dedicated to Saint Venantius, whose feast was celebrated on 18 May.

As of 2025, the locality of Buonacquisto is home to the Church of Santa Maria Maddalena, which functions as a subsidiary church (chiesa sussidiaria) within the Parish of Santa Maria Assunta in Arrone. Ecclesiastically, it is part of the Archdiocese of Spoleto-Norcia.
