= Santa Maria Assunta, Arrone =

Church building in Arrone, Italy

Santa Maria Assunta is a Renaissance-style, Roman Catholic parish church located in the town of Arrone, province of Terni, region of Umbria, Italy.

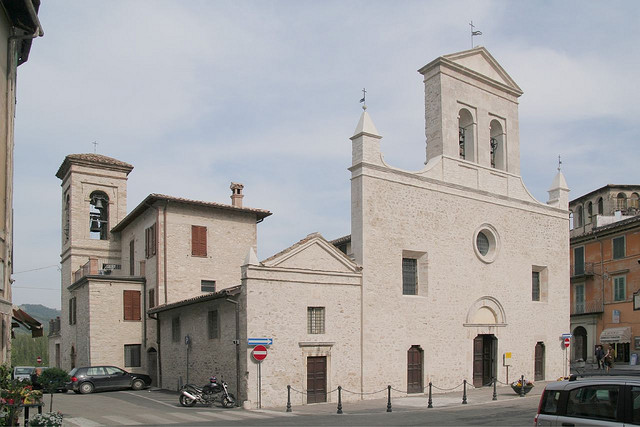
Facade of Church

== History ==
The church has a sober 15th-century white marble facade. The interior, including the apse. The interior contains various frescoes, including the following works:

- Madonna del Rosario (1609) attributed to Giuseppe Bastiani
- Madonna and Child with Saints Peter and John the Evangelist, attributed to Francesco Cozza
- Annunciation, Adoration by Shepherds, Dormition of the Virgin, and Coronation of Virgin (1516) by Vincenzo Tamagni and Giovanni di Pietro da Spoleto
- Frescoes in the apse (1544) by Jacopo Siculo
- The main altar triptych by the Maestro di Arrone (1487) was stolen in 1971.
