= Madonna del Soccorso, Montalcino =

Madonna del Soccorso
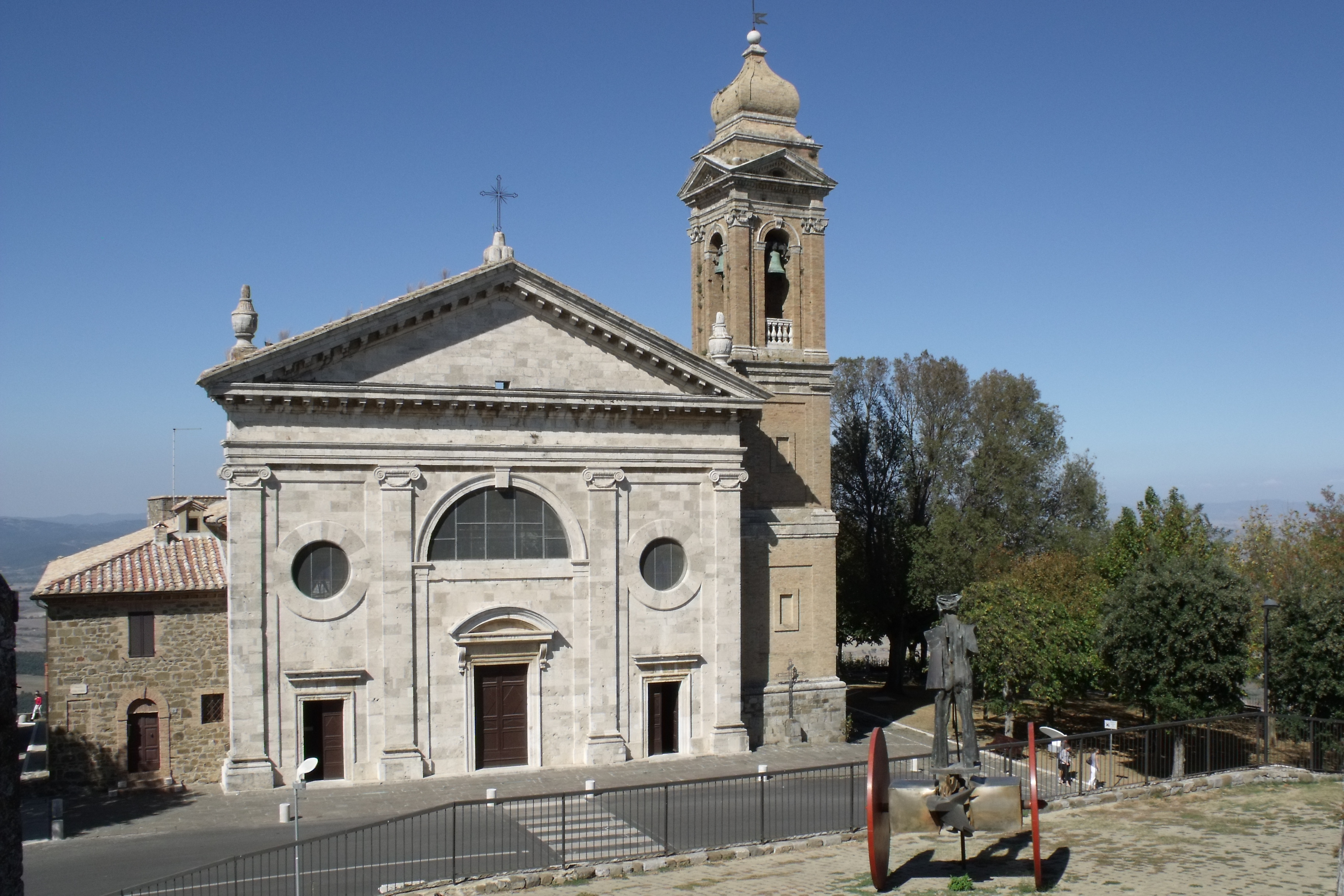

- Location within Italy
- 43°3′38.55″N 11°29′12.33″E
- Location: Montalcino
- Country: Italy
- Denomination: Roman Catholic

History
- Status: Active
- Dedication: St Mary

Architecture
- Functional status: Co-cathedral
- Completed: 1330

The Madonna or Santa Maria del Soccorso is a Roman Catholic Co-cathedral church or Sanctuary located at Via Spagni in Montalcino, region of Tuscany, Italy. The church was erected across the centuries and thus erected in multiple styles, including a renaissance layout, baroque interiors, and a neoclassical façade.

== History ==
The church was initially built at the site of a chapel set against the walls of the town, with a frescoed Madonna and Child. A church build around this icon was consecrated in 1330. In 1553, it gained the title of Santa Maria del Soccorso after a repulse of besieging landsknechts of Charles V, Holy Roman Emperor.

Among the interior artworks is a Crucifixion by Francesco Vanni and a Virgin surrounded by Angelic musicians with Saints Sebastian and Roch (circa 1527) by Vicenzo da San Gimignano. This latter painting was originally found in the Oratory of St Roch in the town.

The bell-tower was added in 1625, and the façade was not completed until the early 19th-century. In 1913, the Madonna del Soccorso was named patron of the Diocese and city, and a festival is held in her honor on May 8, with a special celebration every 25 years.
