= Sant'Antonio di Padova, Loro Piceno =

Church in Loro Piceno, Italy

Coordinates: 43°9′42.08″N 13°25′28.18″E

Sant’Antonio da Padova is a Roman Catholic church located in the town of Loro Piceno, province of Macerata, in the region of Marche, Italy. It is currently located in the town's cemetery, and it was declared unsafe after an earthquake in 1997.

== History ==
The church was completed along with a Capuchin order convent circa 1578. The convent was occupied from 1569 to 1887. Construction was begun in part to minister to the milling troops, ultimately used by Pope Pius V and other leaders in the Battle of Lepanto in 1571.

The church later also took up the veneration of Seraphin of Montegranaro, born in 1540 in Montegranaro, and who died in 1604 in the convent of Santa Maria di Solestà of Ascoli Piceno. The Capuchin friar was beatified in 1729 and canonized in 1767.

The church houses an elaborate 17th-century, intarsio wooden tabernacle, modeled after a Ciborium, completed by the capuchin friar, Fra Liberato da Macerata.
