= Domenico Luigi Valeri =

Italian painter and architect

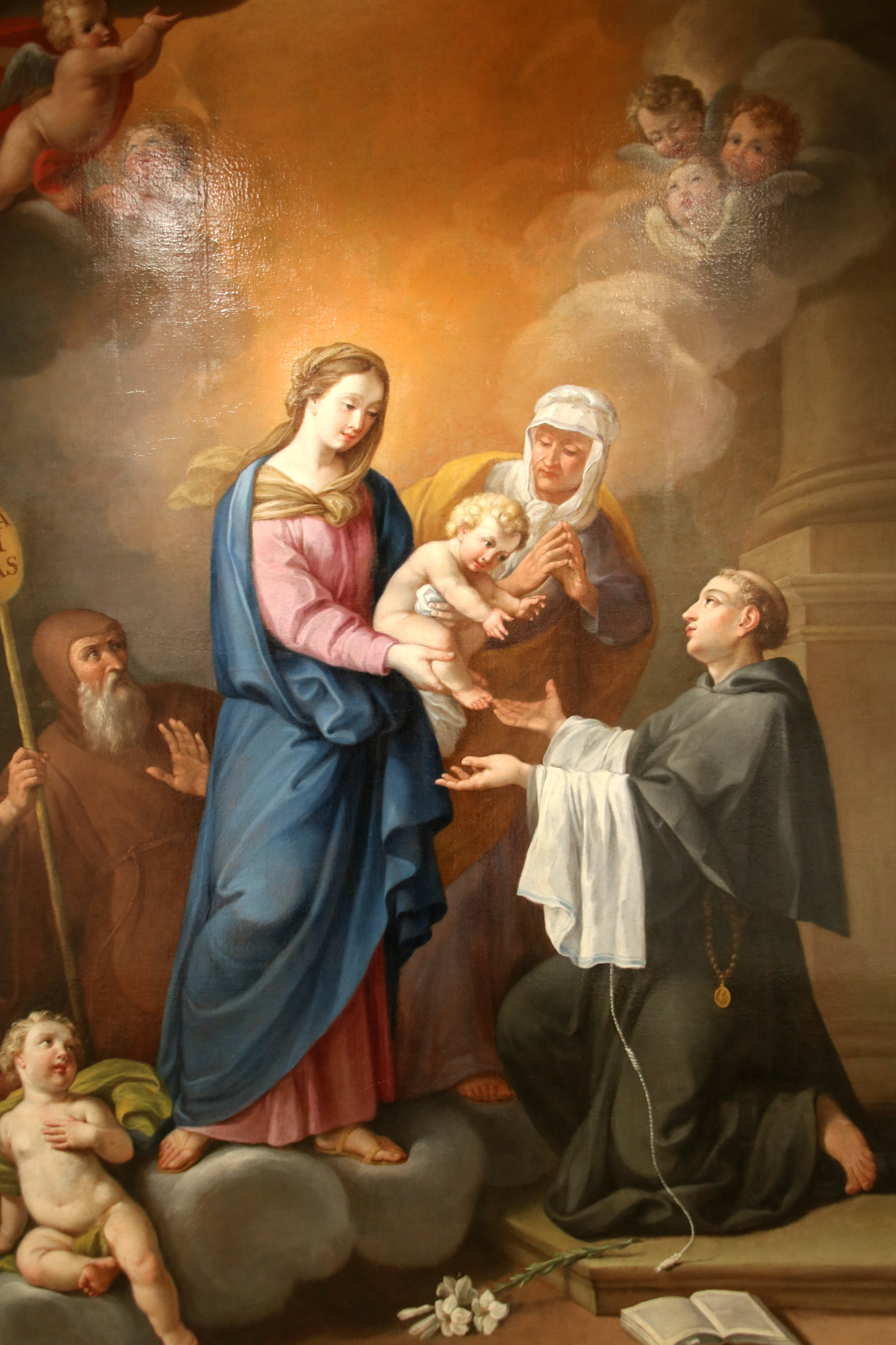
Chiesa dell’Adorazione, Jesi

Domenico Luigi Valeri (20 August 1701 - 1770) was an Italian painter and architect active in Marche, Papal States.

== Biography ==
He was born in Jesi. He painted canvases for the church of Santa Maria di Piazza in Serrapetrona. He died in Camerino.

Among his architectural projects, was the Arco Clementino, the Teatro del Leone, and the choir of the church of San Settimio, all in Jesi. The fountain (1762) in front of the City Hall of Assisi is attributed to Valeri.

Among his paintings:

- Birth of the Virgin (1742), chiesa dell’Adorazione, Jesi
- Judith, Solomon, Sacrifice of Jephthah, and Judgement of Solomon (1728), former Seminary in piazza Federico II, Jesi
- Santa Scolastica, Sant Anna, Jesi
- Palazzo Ghisleri, Jesi
- Chiesa dei cappuccini, Jesi
- Madonna with Child with Angels and Saints Anne, John the Baptist and Carlo Borromeo (after 1765), Chiesa del Rosario, Pievebovigliana
- San Fedele da Sigmaringa, all’isolato Carducci
- Glory of St Joseph, Vallesina, Monsano
- Church ovals, Santa Maria, Monsano
- Frescoes, chiesetta Santa Maria della Castellaretta, Staffolo
