= Santa Maria delle Grazie, Loro Piceno =

Church in Loro Piceno, Italy

Santa Maria delle Grazie is a Baroque-style Roman Catholic church located on Via Garibaldi in the town of Loro Piceno, province of Macerata, in the region of Marche, Italy.

== History ==
Thi church was built in 1666 under the patronage of the Confraternity of the Santissimo Sacramento, who maintained ownership until the 19th century. It underwent reconstructions in 1724 and 1777, and restorations in 1939, 1951 and during the 1980s.

The brick façade has monumental pilasters holding a triangular tympanum with a central oculus. The interior has a single nave. The arch overlooking the presbytery has rich stucco decoration with an inscription: DABO GRA - TIAM POPULO. The lateral walls of the nave contain mirrors in the stucco with rich sculptural decoration and two paintings depicting the Translation of the Holy House of Loreto with the Madonna and Saints Liborio, Francis, Mark and Anne. The stucco ceiling decorations includes depictions of doves, symbolizing the Holy Spirit.
