= Santa Maria di Piazza, Serrapetrona =

Church in Serrapetrona, Italy

Santa Maria di Piazza is a Baroque-style, Roman Catholic church located on Piazza Santa Maria in the town of Serrapetrona, province of Macerata, region of Marche, Italy.

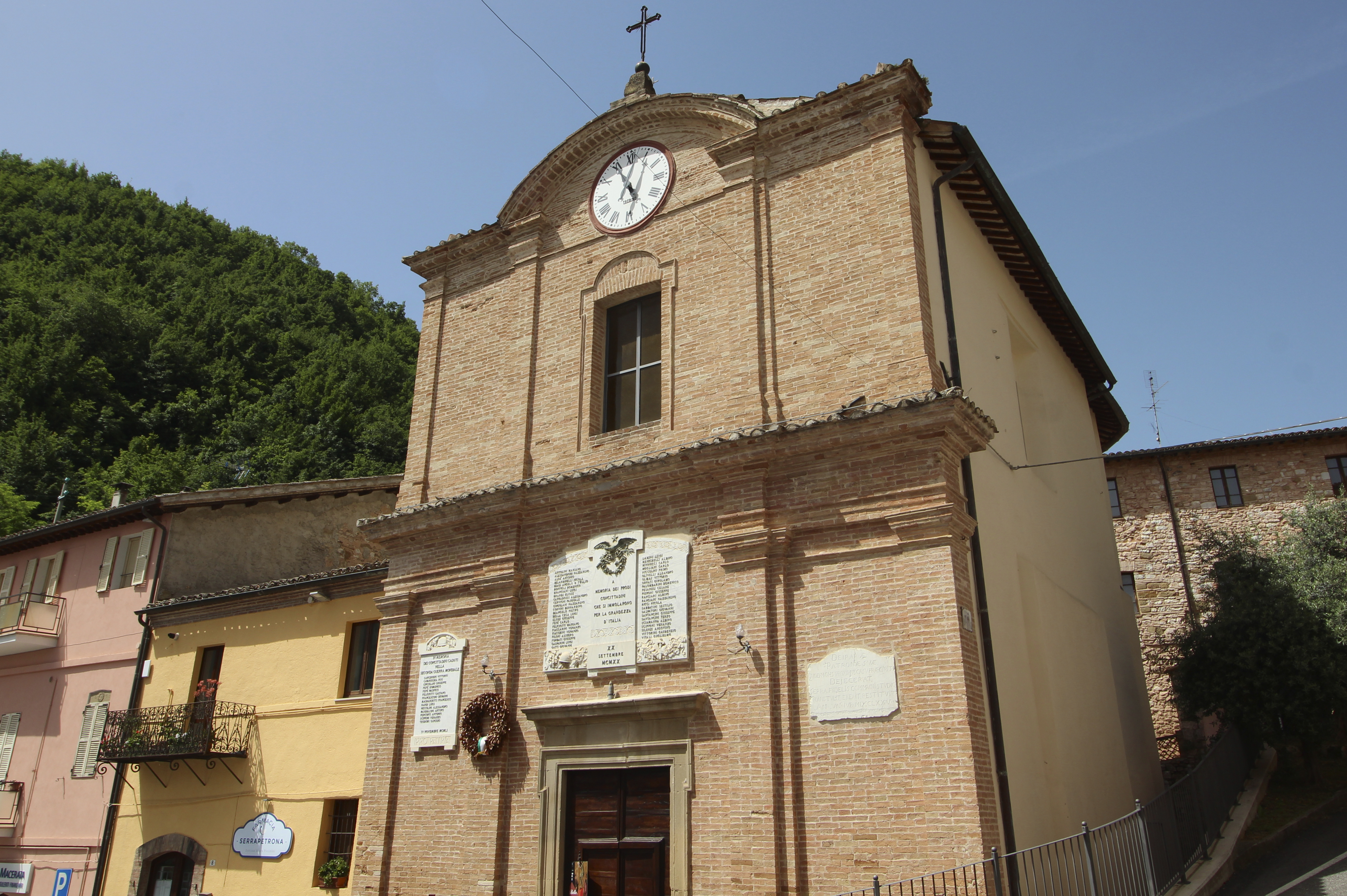
The church facade of Santa Maria di Piazza

== History ==
A Romanesque-style church at the site was reconstructed in 1775. The brick façade has two story Tuscan pilasters. The interiors have a Neoclassical sobriety. The presbytery has a large canvas depicting the Assumption of the Holy Virgin with Saints, Angels and the Eternal Father, attributed to Angelo Antonio Bittarelli. It also houses paintings by Domenico Luigi Valeri.
