= Sant'Agrippino a Forcella =

Church in Naples, Italy

Coordinates: 40.850570°N 14.262085°E

Sant'Agrippino a Forcella is a church located on Via Forcella in Naples, Italy. A church at the site may have been present since the fifth century, but we have documentation of a consecration during the papacy of pope Clement IV in 1265-1268.

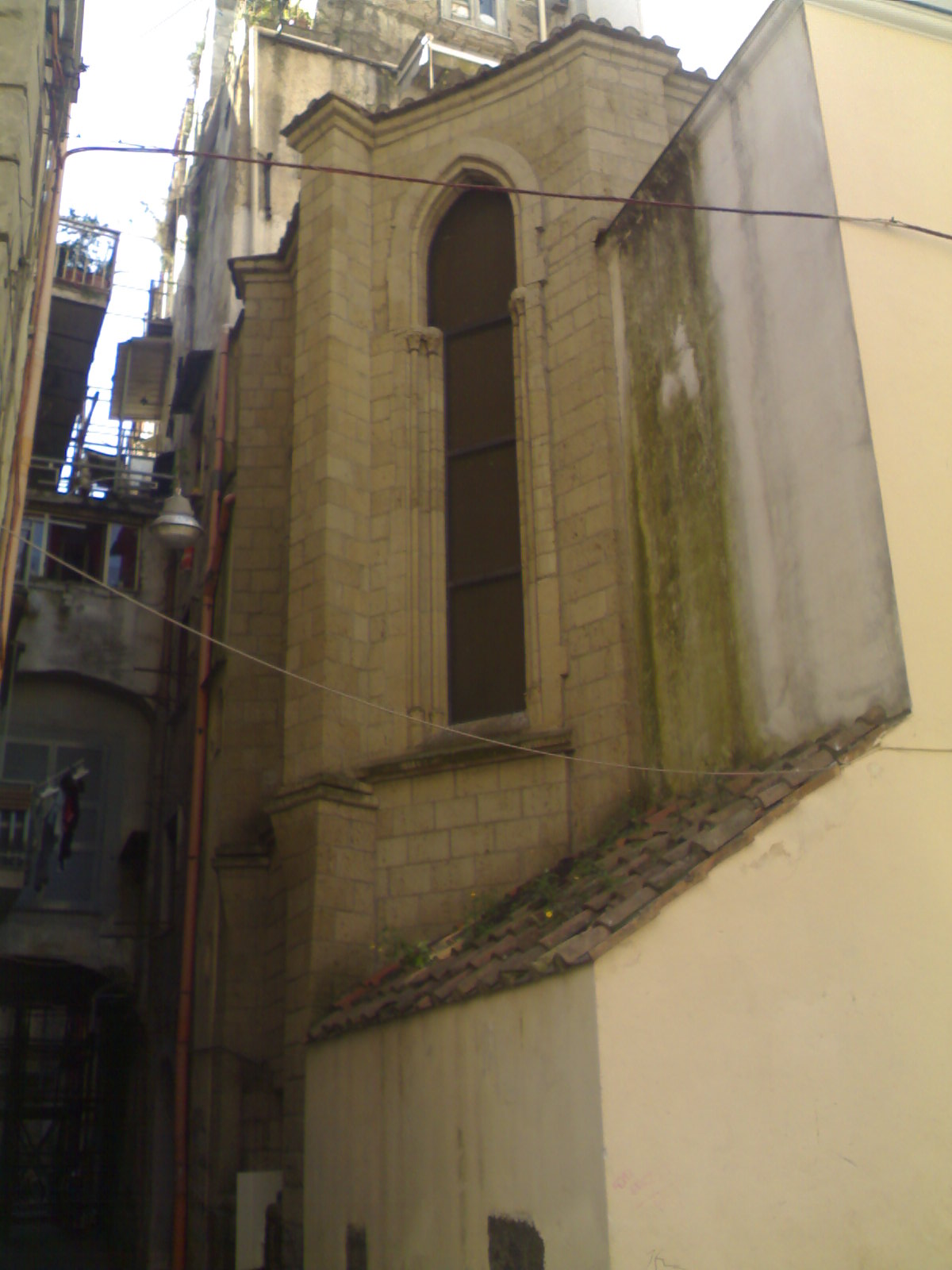
Exterior of Apse

The church retains some Gothic architecture details in the apse, but the remainder of the church demonstrates the Baroque reconstructions (1758) by Nicola Tagliacozzi Canale. The exterior 14th century portal was designed by the Pisan Antonio di Chelino, pupil of Donatello.

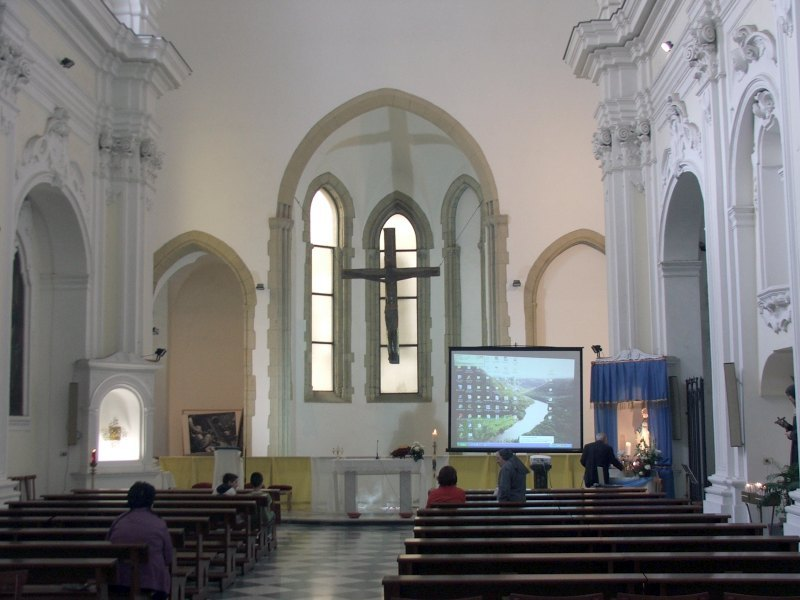
Interior

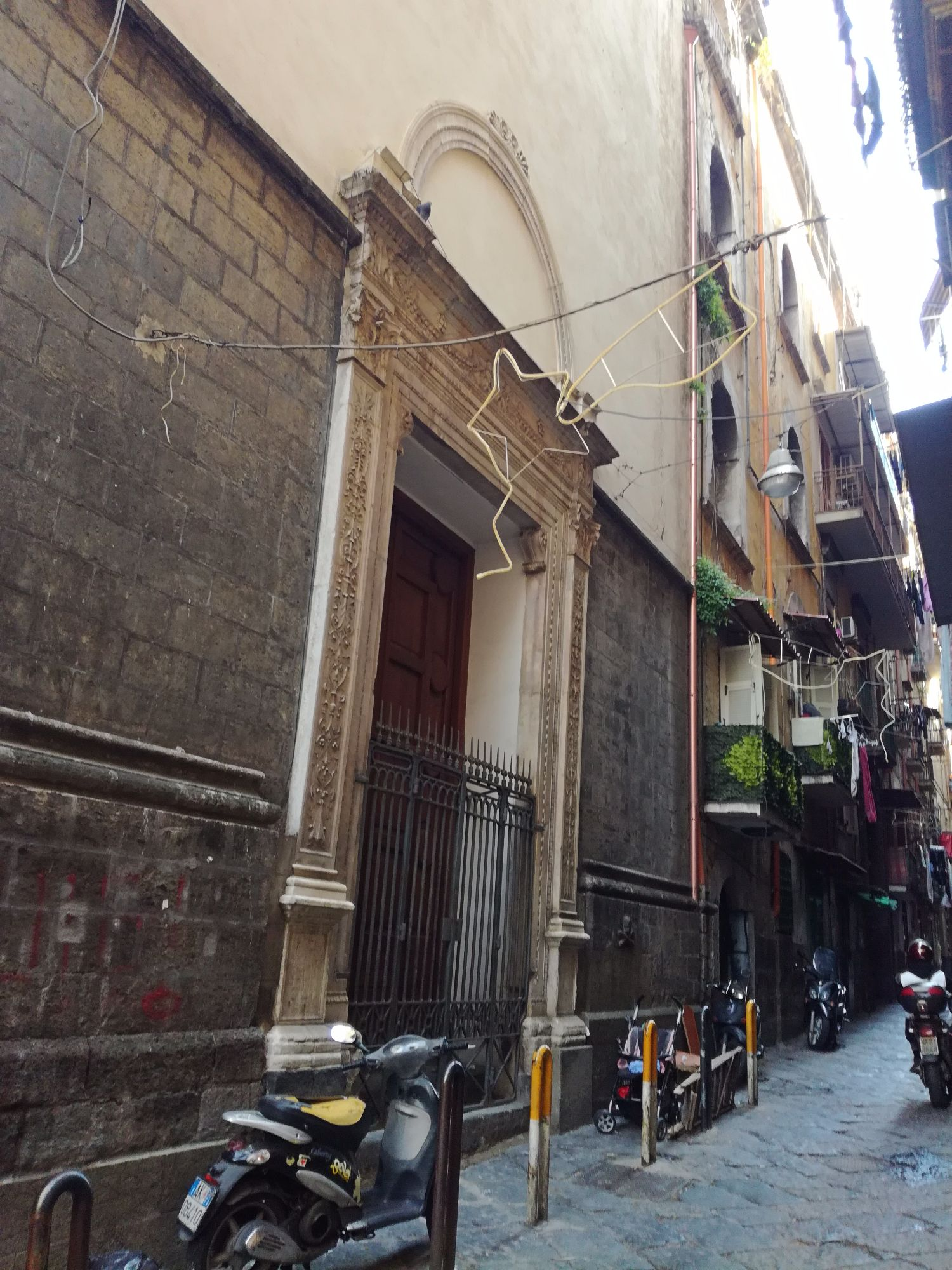
Gothic portal

== Bibliography ==
- Vincenzo Regina, Le chiese di Napoli. Viaggio indimenticabile attraverso la storia artistica, architettonica, letteraria, civile e spirituale della Napoli sacra, Newton e Compton editor, Naples 2004.
