= Santa Maria a Piazza =

Church in Naples, Italy

Coordinates: 40°51′02.84″N 14°15′43.7″E

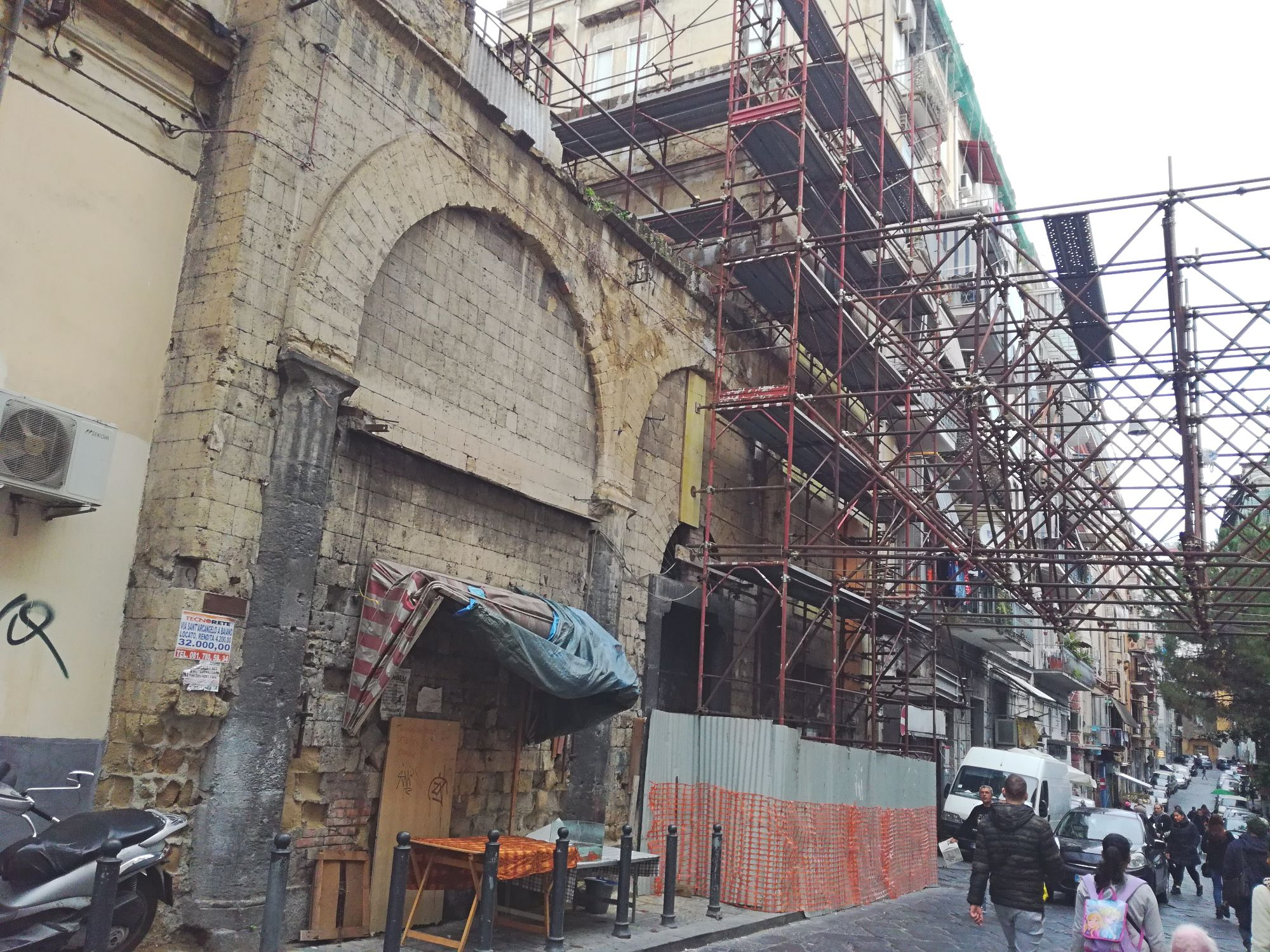
Santa Maria a Piazza

Santa Maria a Piazza is a former Roman Catholic church, located at Piazzetta Forcella (Via Forcella) in central Naples, region of Campania, Italy.

Despite being among the oldest churches in Naples, according to tradition first erected by Emperor Constantine in the 4th century, the church is in ruinous state. Documentation of the church dates to the 9th century, and a bell-tower, present until 1924, dated to the 10th century. The interior once housed wooden crucifixes from the nearby church of Sant'Agrippino a Forcella, but the interior 17th-century canvases depicting the Holy Family and the Nativity are lost. The sepulchral plaque of the Duke of Naples Buono from the 9th century has been transferred to the cathedral.
