= Vincenzo Tamagni =

Italian painter

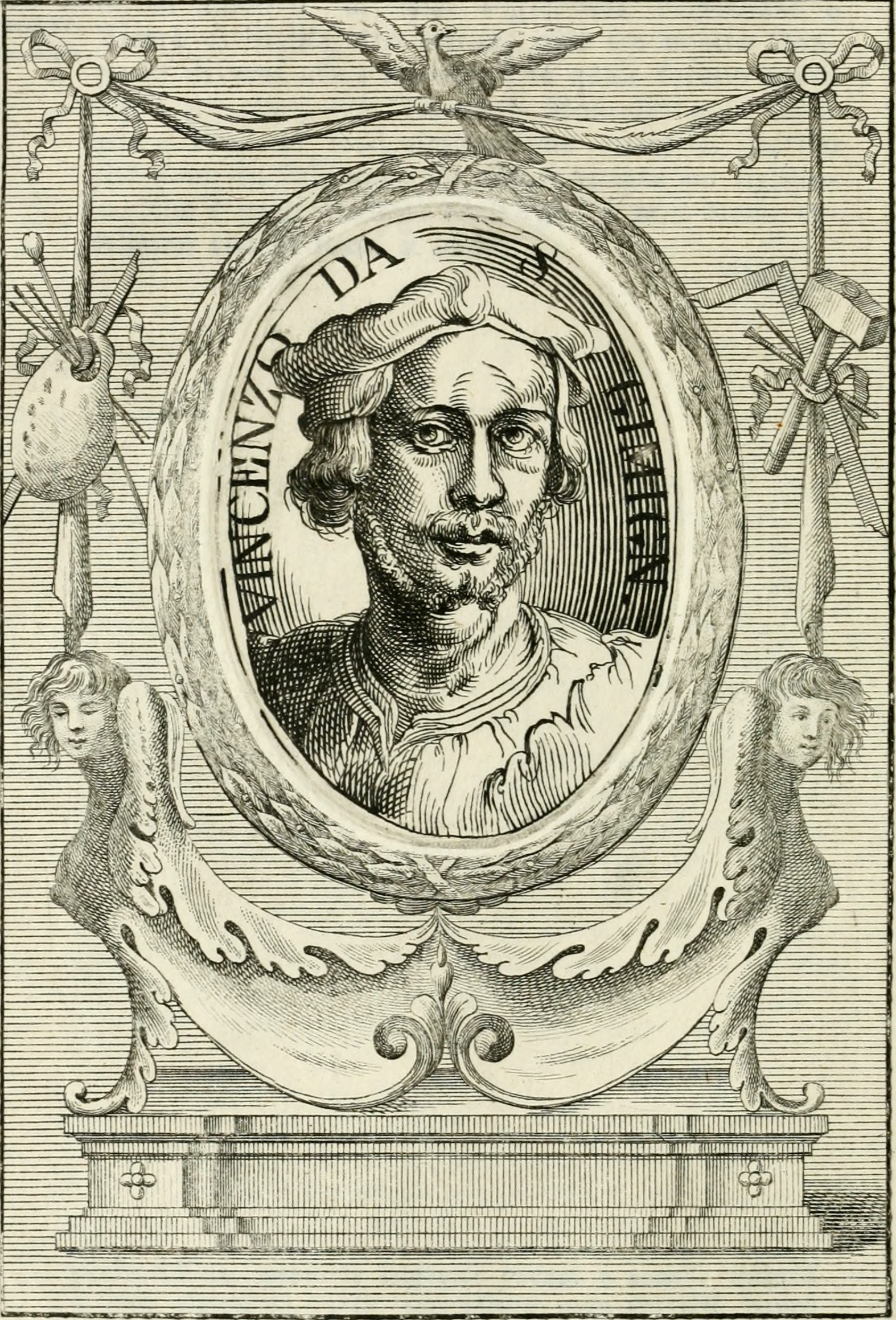
Vincenzo Tamagni

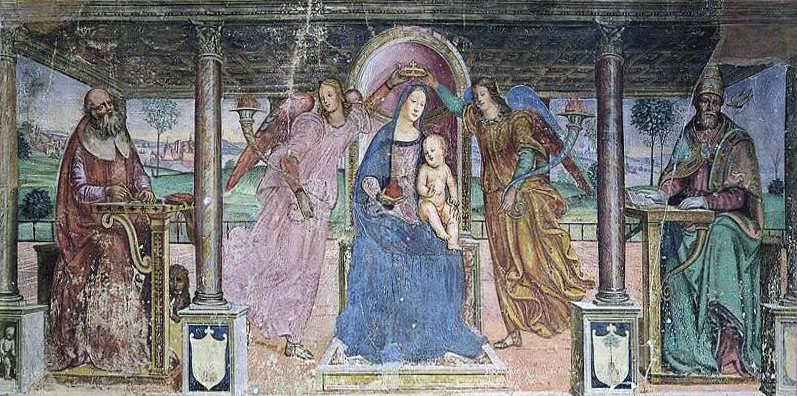
Vincenzo Tamagni, Madonna and Child Enthroned with Angels and Saints; fresco in Spedale di Santa Maria della Croce, Montalcino

Vincenzo Tamagni (1492 – c. 1516) was an Italian painter of the Renaissance. Born in San Gimignano, he became an apprentice first with il Sodoma at Monte Oliveto Maggiore, and then worked in the Vatican Loggie under Raphael in Rome (1512-1516). Drawings of the Raphael frescoes in Tamagni's hand exist. He mainly painted in the towns surrounding Siena. He painted altarpieces for San Girolamo and Sant'Agostino in San Gimignano. He is featured in Giorgio Vasari's Vite, who refers to him as Vincenzo da San Gimignano.

His earliest works are some frescoes and paintings in Montalcino, including some works now in the church of the Madonna del Soccorso. In the apse of Santa Maria Assunta in the town of Arrone in Umbria, he painted frescoes in conjunction with Lo Spagna.
