= Santa Maria in Piazza, Loro Piceno =

Church building in Loro Piceno, Italy

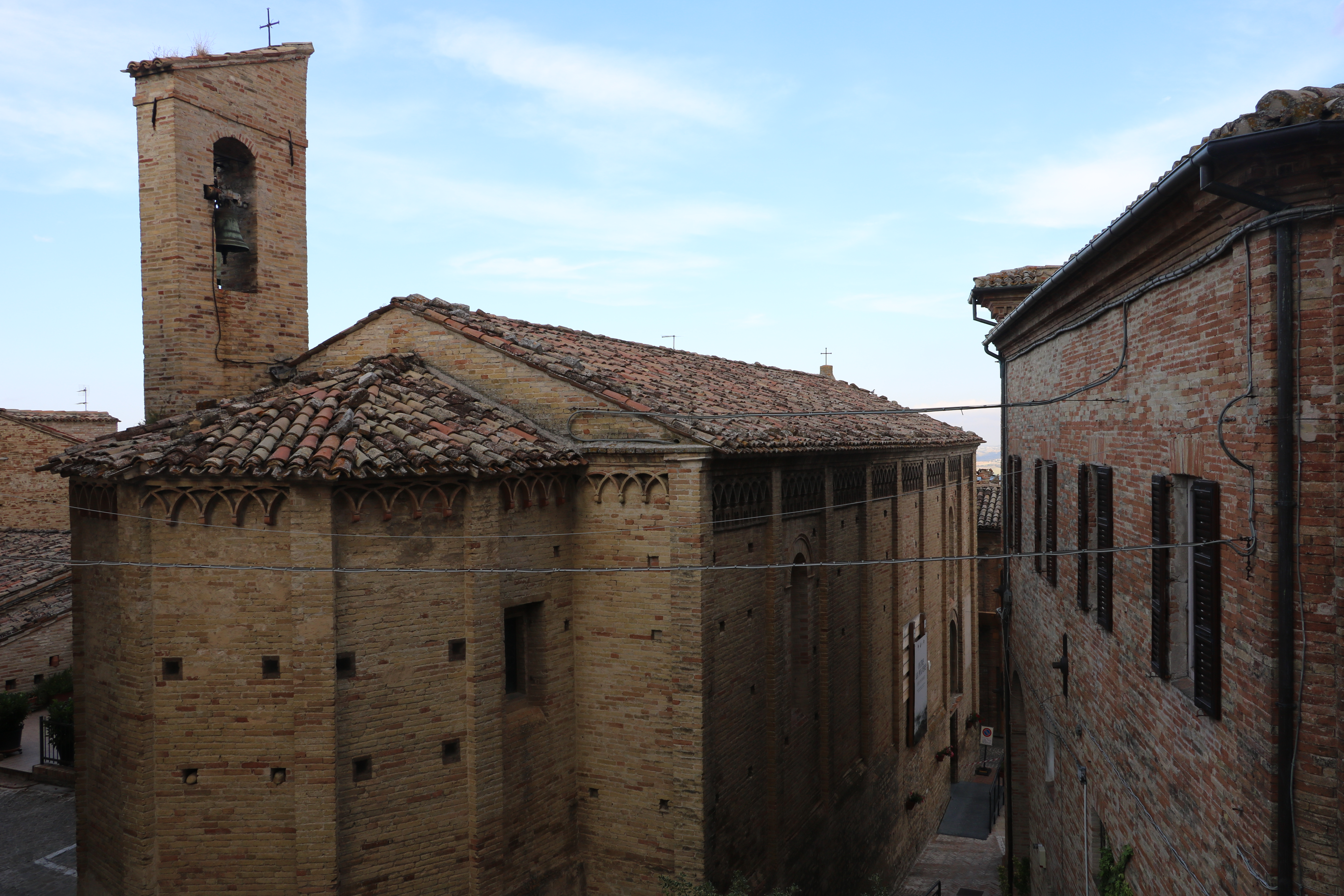

Santa Maria in Piazza is a Roman Catholic church located in Piazza Matteoti in the town of Loro Piceno, province of Macerata, in the region of Marche, Italy.

== History ==
The church was built originally in the 12th century by the Benedictine order. It became property over the next century of the Abbey of Fiastra. In 1452, the church was officiated by secular clergy and in 1597, it belonged to the diocese of Camerino.

The brick façade has an elaborate portal with an ogival tympanum and floral motifs, showing both Romanesque and Gothic influences. The Exterior wall have a votive niche with a repainted 15th century fresco of the Madonna del Soccorso. The main altar in 1581 had a wooden tabernacle maintained by the Confraternity of the Corpo di Cristo and del Sacramento. It was flanked by a number of reliquaries. The main altarpiece was a Virgin and Saints painted by Vittore Crivelli, stolen during the Napoleonic invasions.

The nave was flanked by three altars on the right, one dedicated to San Venanzo; a second to the Madonna della Misericordia, housing a fresco of the Crucifixion; and a third altar of the Crucifixion with a venerated crucifix, putatively containing a relic of the sacred spine. On the left, were the altars of San Bartolomeo, Santa Maria di Loreto, and St John the Baptist. The coat of arms of the Bishop of Buoi was once above the baptismal font, it is now to the right of the entrance.
