= Giuseppe Bastiani =

Italian painter

Giuseppe Bastiani (active in 1594) was an Italian painter active in the Renaissance period, mainly in his hometown of Macerata. He was a disciple of Gaspare Gasparini. He painted frescoes in the church of Santa Maria Assunta, Arrone.
