= Chiaravalle Abbey, Fiastra =

Cistercian abbey in Marche, Italy

Coordinates: 43°13′18″N 13°24′19″E

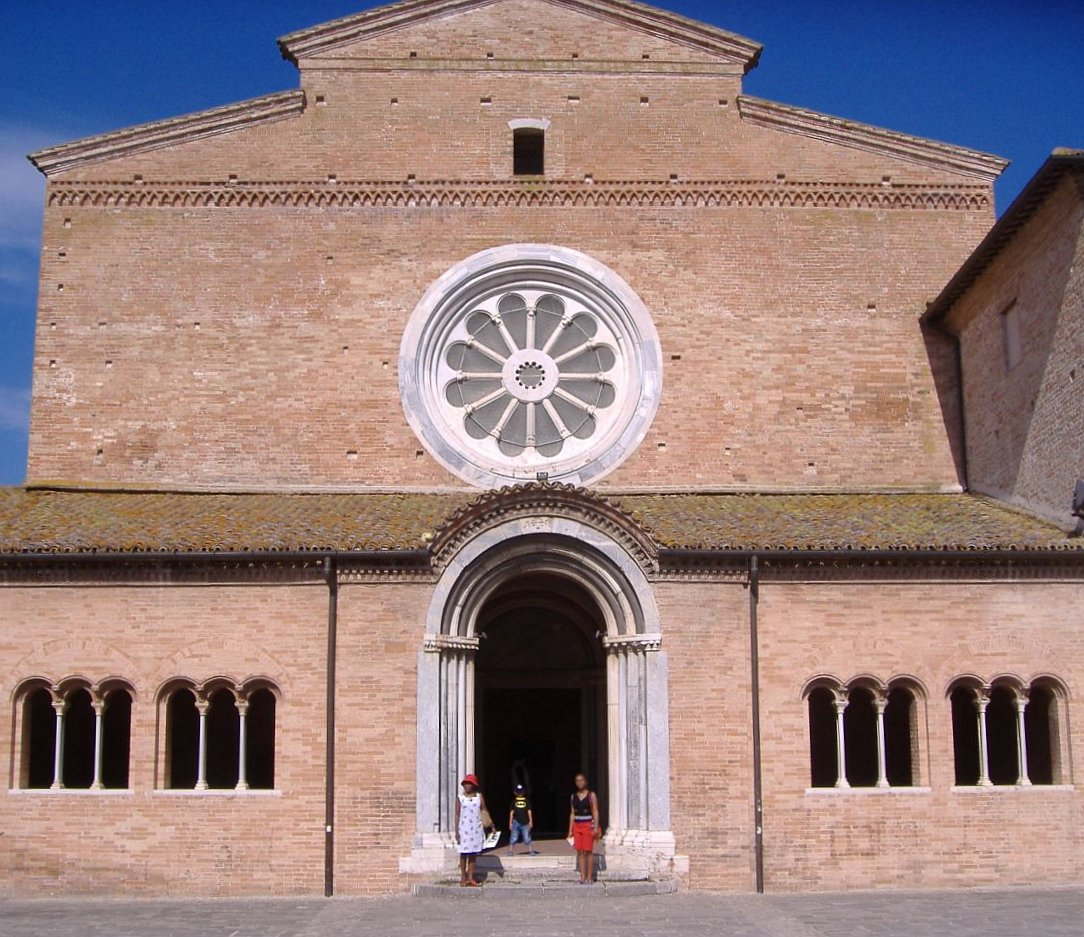
West front of the abbey church

Chiaravalle Abbey, Fiastra (Italian: Abbazia di Chiaravalle di Fiastra), is a Cistercian abbey situated between Tolentino and Urbisaglia, in the Marche. It is one of the best preserved Cistercian abbeys in Italy. It is surrounded by a large nature reserve.

== History ==
In 1142 Guarnerio II, Duke of Spoleto and Marquis of the March of Ancona, gave the Cistercians a large area of land which stretched from the river Chienti to the river Fiastra. The monks, from Chiaravalle Abbey in Milan, arrived on 29 November of the same year and immediately started work on the construction of the monastery. They used material from the ruins of the nearby Roman town of Urbs Salvia, destroyed by Alaric in 408-410. They also began reclaiming the marshy woodland, inhabited by wolves, bears and deer.

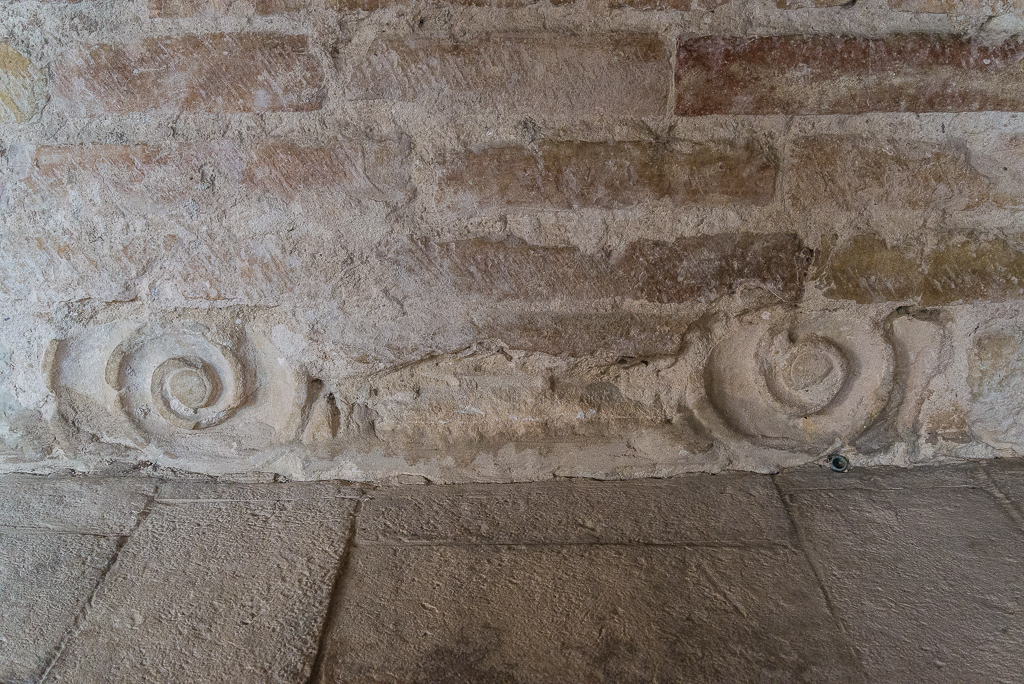
Capital retrieved from Urbs Salvia

The abbey flourished for three centuries. The monks organized their agricultural land into six granges. The monastery was actively involved in encouraging the economic, social and religious development of the area. Its influence grew to the extent that it incorporated 33 dependent churches and monasteries. The history of the abbey is recorded in the collection of 3,194 manuscripts known as the Carte Fiastrensi, now in the state archive of Rome.

In 1422 the abbey was sacked by Braccio da Montone, who destroyed the roof of the church and the tiburio (the high bell tower), and killed a number of the monks.

Subsequently, the Pope entrusted the abbey to a group of eight cardinals. In 1581, the abbey was assigned to the Jesuits. Finally, in 1773, after the suppression of the Jesuits, the whole area was handed over to the noble Bandini family. The last heir of the family, Sigismondo, left the area to the present Giustiniani-Bandini Foundation, who set up the Fiastra Abbey Nature Reserve in order to preserve this heritage. The Reserve, opened on 18 June 1984, was officially recognized by the State on 10 December 1985, as being of national importance.

== Present-day ==
=== Church ===
The church is dedicated to Santa Maria di Chiaravalle di Fiastra. Its architecture is in Romanesque-Burgundian style, and characterized by simplicity and austerity. Building materials for its construction were taken from the nearby Roman settlement of Urbs Salvia.

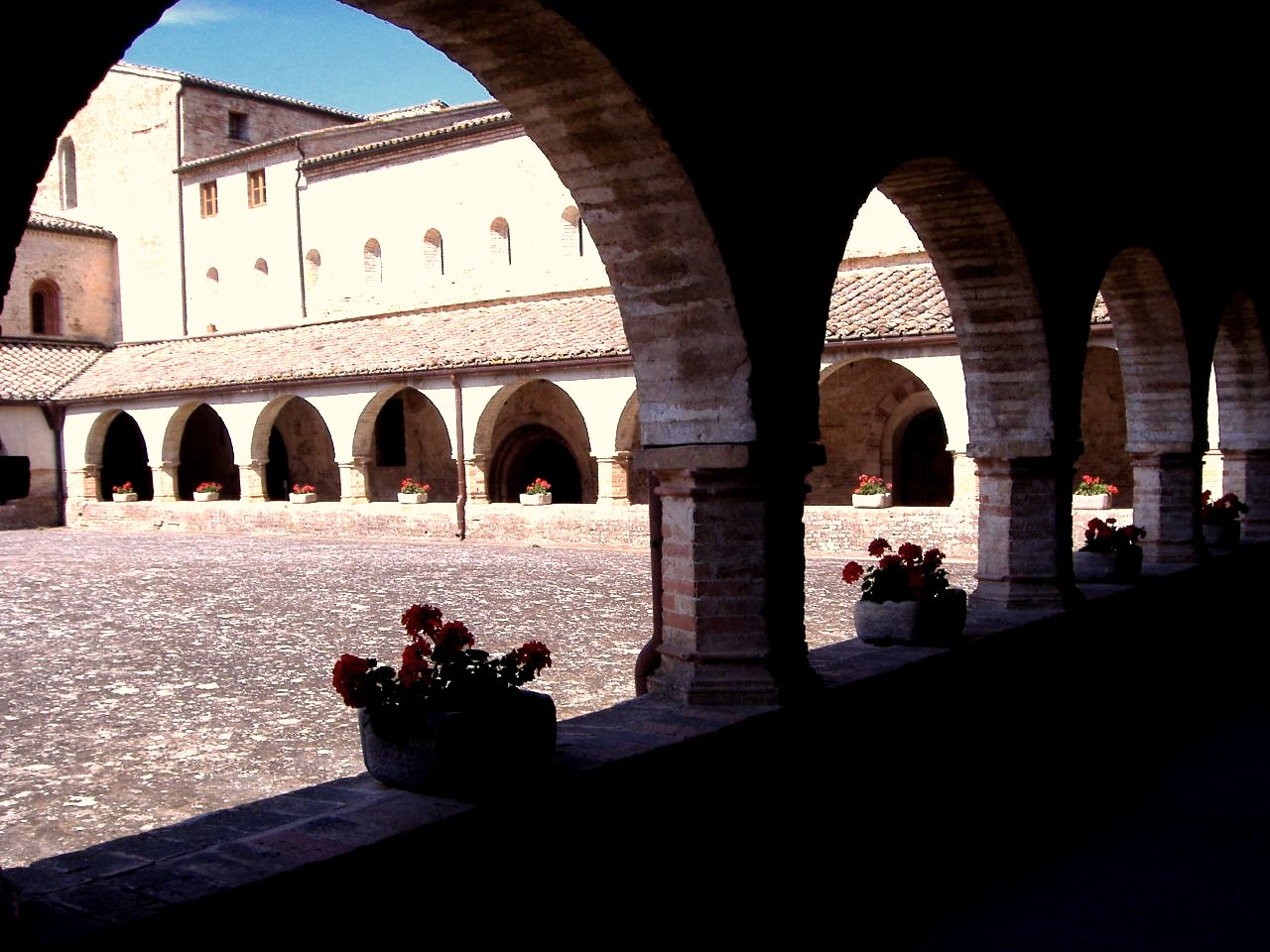
The cloister

The most important elements of the abbey are arranged around the cloister, that is the heart of the monastery: here the monks would contemplate and meditate while walking, or sit under the arcade and study the Sacred Scriptures. A monumental well still stands in the middle and is connected to a cistern which receives rain-water.

The church, dedicated to the Virgin Mary as it is customary for Cistercian churches, was built on the north side of the cloister. The plain façade is adorned only with a rose window and a complex portal. It was further embellished with a three span narthex in the 15th century.

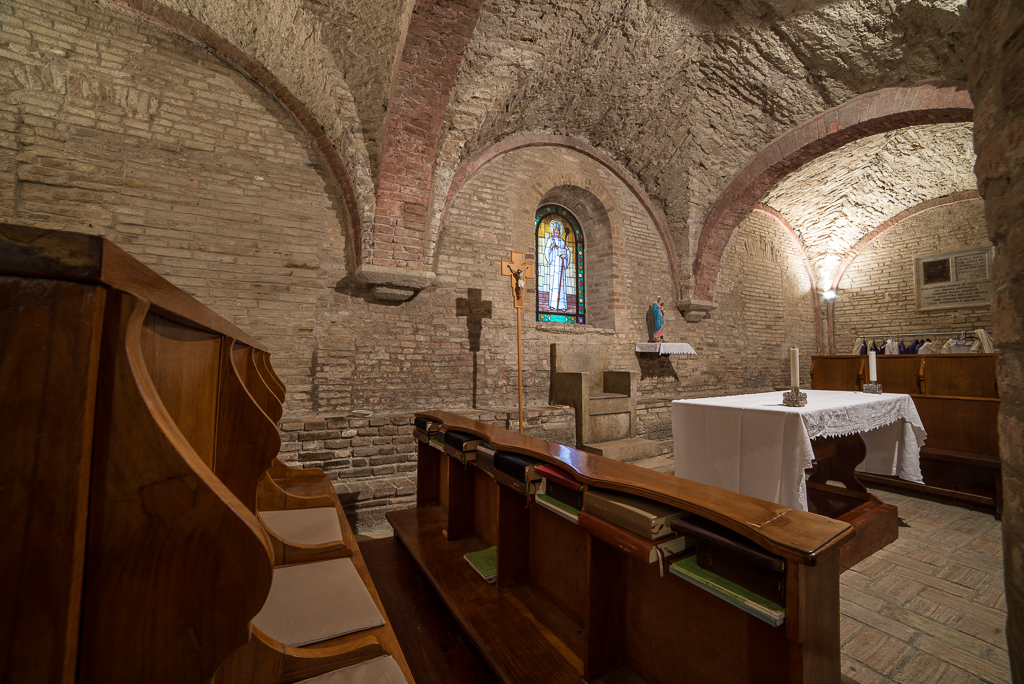
The Chapter House

The interior of the church is Latin cross in shape. It is divided into one nave and two aisles by pilasters, crowned by Romanesque capitals.

The Chapter House is the holiest place in the monastery after the church. It was built on the eastern side of the cloister. Here the abbots would read a chapter of St Benedict's Rule every day, hence the name, the most important decisions about the abbey were made and business was transacted. The refectory is on the south-western side of the cloister, but only the lay-brothers' one still survives. It was built on a rectangular plan, the cross vaults of which rest on six wonderful Roman columns. The dormitories are on the western side of the cloister. The lay-brothers part is on the floor above; it is partly used as a meeting place, and it is also taken up by the nineteenth-century Bandini building.

=== Monastery ===
The monastery, which is next to the church, still functions as a Cistercian community. It boasts a beautiful cloister rebuilt in the 15th century. All around the cloister, it is possible to see the lay brothers' refectory, the cellar, the chapter house and the grottoes.

== See also ==
- Urbisaglia
- Archaeological Park of Urbs Salvia
