= Rocca di Urbisaglia =

16th-century military fortification

Coordinates: 43.1958°N 13.3761°E

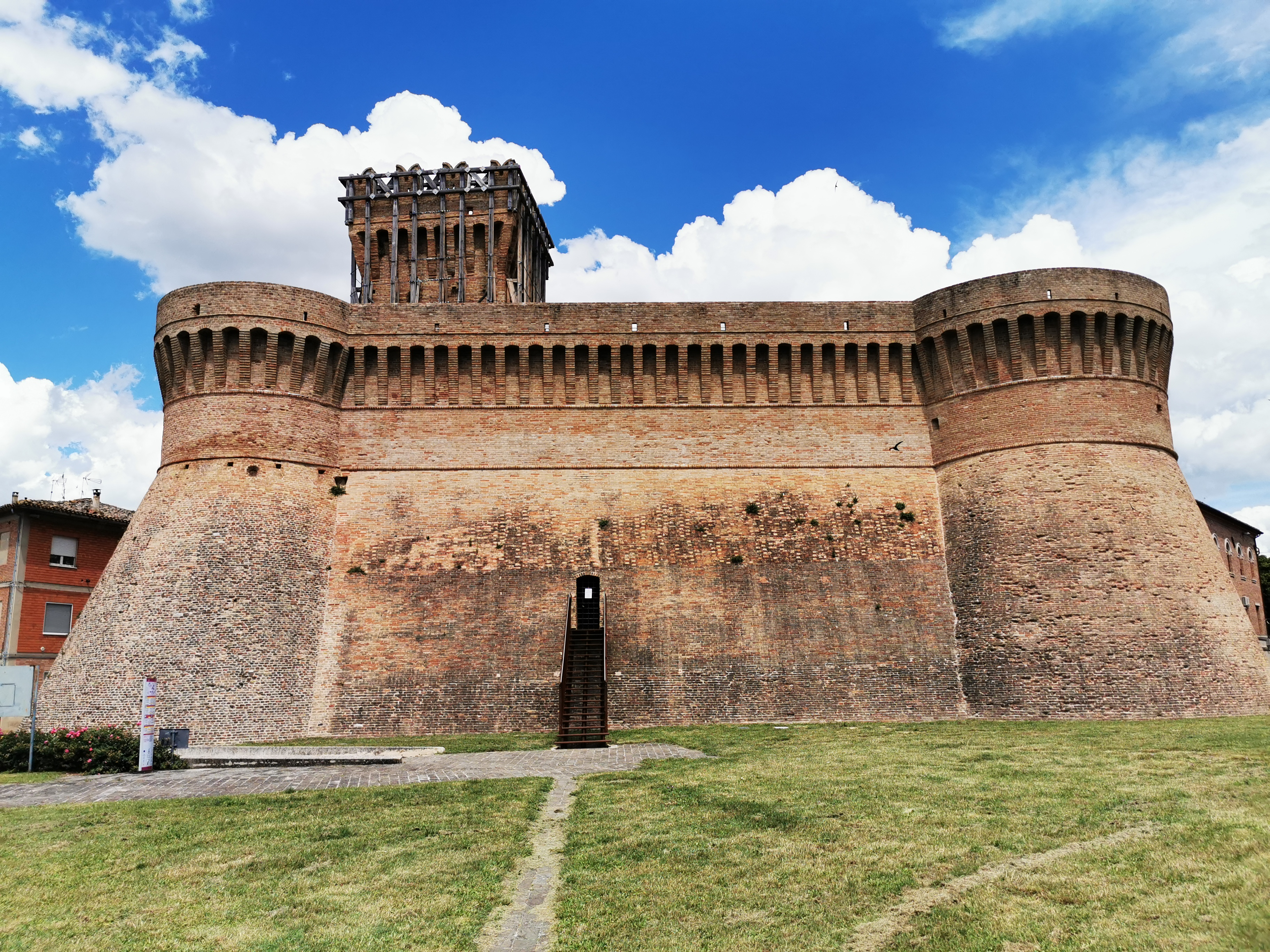
Rocca di Urbisaglia

The Rocca di Urbisaglia is a 16th-century military fortification, including ruins of medieval fortifications and Roman walls.
Its imposing position, dominating the urban area and the Fiastra Valley below, suggests that the Arx (the citadel, the most protected area of the town) or the Capitol of the Roman town Urbs Salvia was once located here.

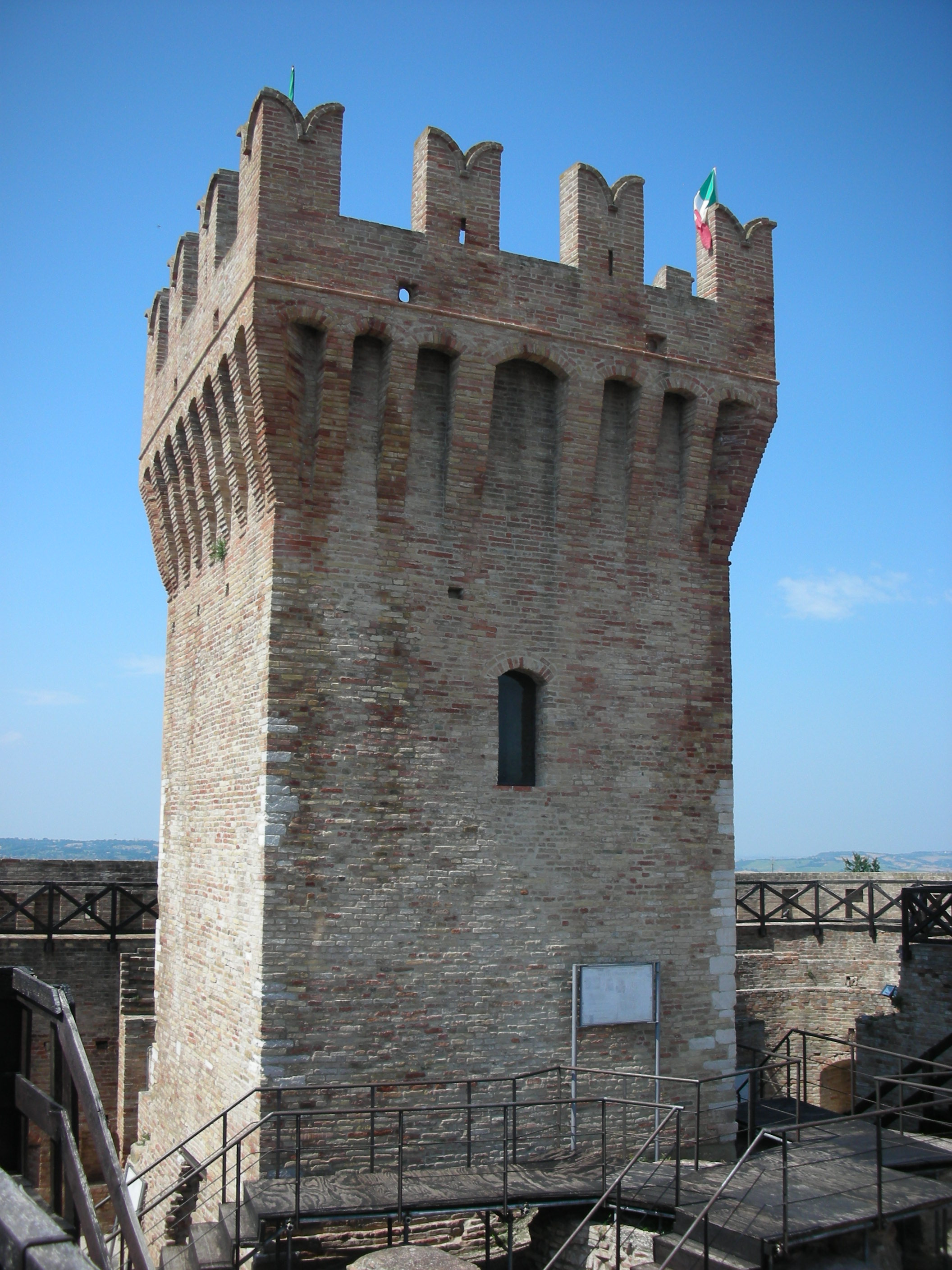
Rocca di Urbisaglia, the keep

== History ==
The population of Urbs Salvia took refuge all around the Arx - Capitolium stronghold after leaving the town, because of the Barbarian invasions. Here the Castro de Orbesallia, ruled by the Abbracciamonte family, had its origins.
During the 13th century, several members of the Abbracciamontes started to sell their part of Urbisaglia to the comune of Tolentino, who soon became the only owner of the town.
To prevent any rebellious acts from the citizens of Urbisaglia, who resented the external power over them, Tolentino asked the pope Alexander VI the permission to build a new fortress, which was already finished in 1507, when a 12 soldiers garrison was sent to guard the town.

== Structure ==
It has a trapezoidal shape with the longest side facing away from the town in order to better face potential attacks. There are four corner towers, a gate tower and a keep where the garrison Tolentino had imposed on Urbisaglia resided.

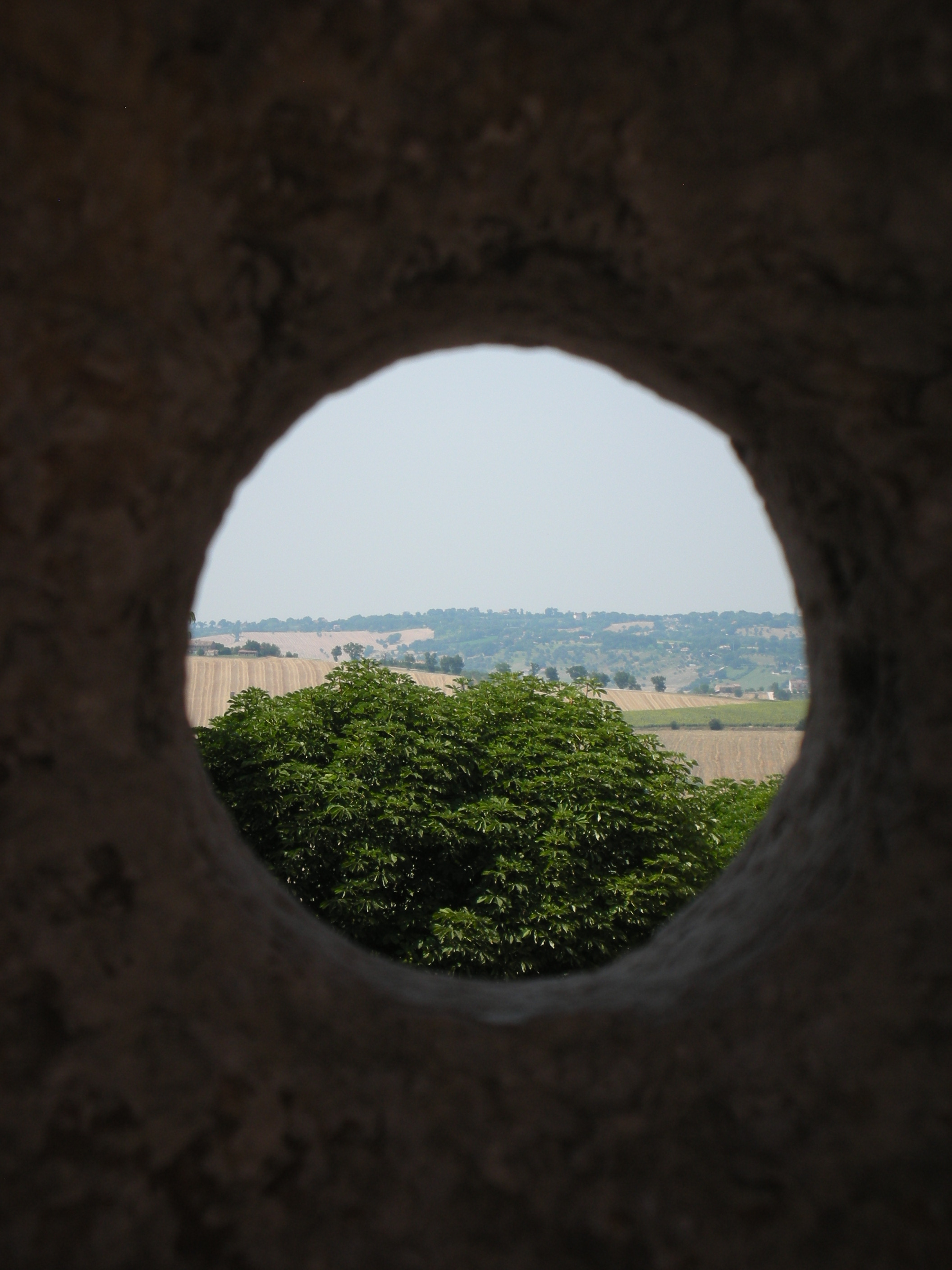
Rocca di Urbisaglia, landscape through an embrasure

=== Keep ===
It was originally a watchtower. It has undergone several reconstructions between the 12th and 15th centuries and its current height (24 m/79 ft) is lower than it was initially. The top, currently crowned with Ghibelline merlons, was covered with a gable roof. The entrance to the keep was at a higher level than the ground, so that the only way to enter it was through a wooden ladder which could be removed in case of danger.

=== Gate Tower ===
It was protected by the North tower and the keep and had its own musket embrasures. It once joined the fortress and the Western wall, later destroyed. The entrance to the fortress was located at a higher level than the ground and could be reached through a wooden ladder which was removed in case of danger.
Current entrance was a small door opening toward the outside of the fortress. It later became the only viable entrance after the anachronistic wooden ladder was destroyed.

=== West Tower ===
Along with the South Tower and the curtain wall connecting them, it was the external front of the fortress. It had two fire levels, the first one on the gun emplacement at the top, which was protected by merlons and embrasures, and the second one at ground level in the casemate with a reconstructed barrel vaulted ceiling and three embrasures.

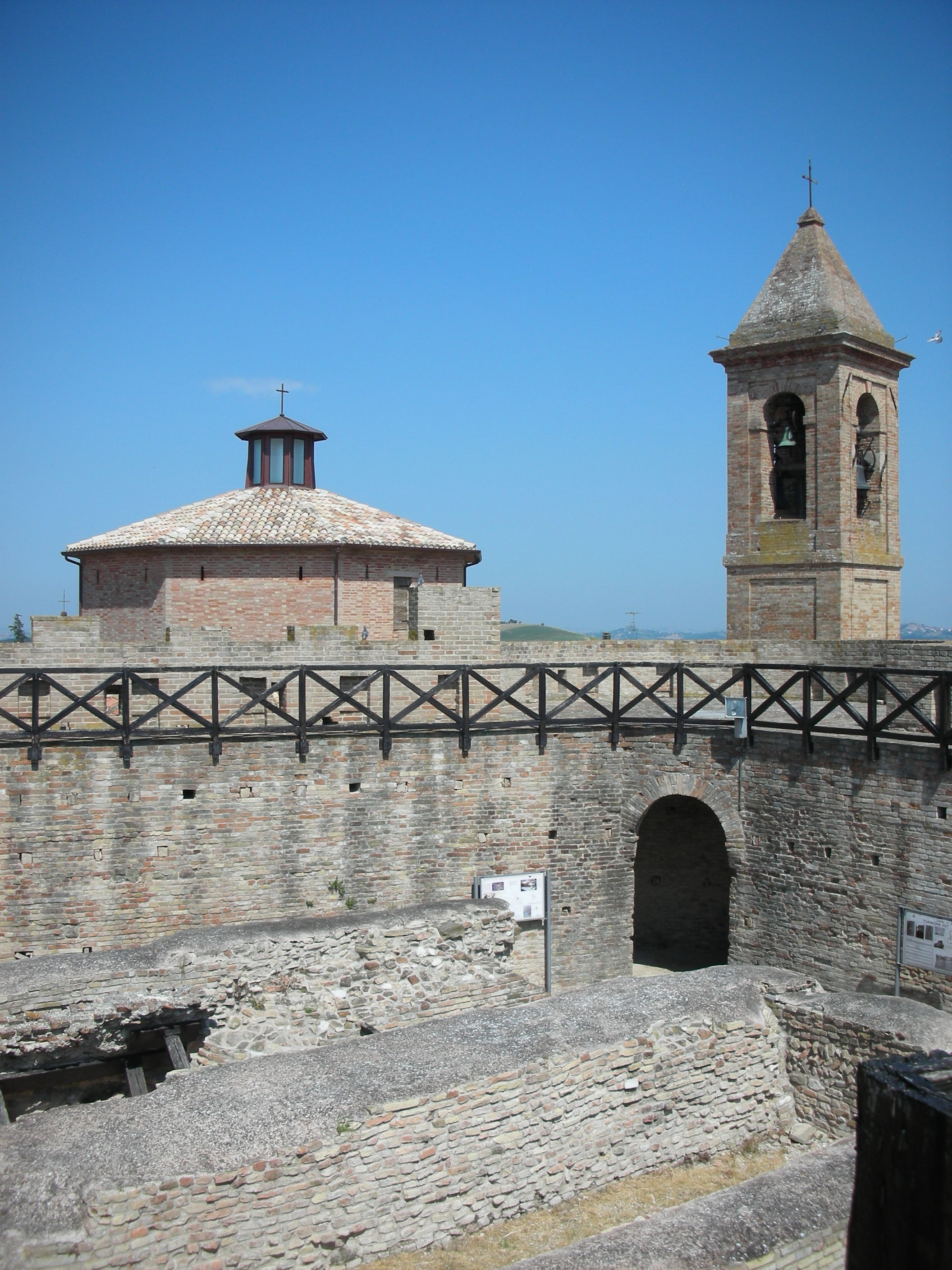
Rocca di Urbisaglia, inside. In the background, the cupola and the campanile of San Lorenzo Collegiate church

=== South Tower ===
Facing enemy territory, it was the fortified tower with the highest exposure to risk. Similarly to the West Tower, it has two fire levels. Roman remains from Urbs Salvia are still visible at its base.

=== East Tower ===
Located within the walls of the fortress, the function of this tower was not to defend but rather to store provisions and supplies. In case of a siege it was used as living quarters: that's the reason why, unlike the other ones, the East tower is covered with a gable roof. It is also the only tower where the groined vault has remained intact. By the embrasures below the vault, there are vent-holes whose function was to let out smoke and gases produced by artillery discharge.

=== North Tower ===
Enclosed within the fortress's walls, its function, unlike the East Tower, was to defend the North-eastern front in case attackers were to break into the city walls and spread throughout the castle. There are three embrasures at ground level, while the vault which used to cover the chamber is no longer present.

=== Cistern ===
It was built to catch and store rainwater which was then used for the daily needs of the fortress occupants.

== See also ==
- Urbisaglia
- Archaeological Park of Urbs Salvia

== Sources ==
- Bacchielli L. - Ch. Delplace - W. Eck - L. Gasperini - G. Paci. Studi su Urbisaglia romana. Supplementi a PICUS. Tivoli, 1995.
- Belloni, Beniamino. La Rocca medievale di Urbisaglia Bonservizi. Tolentino, 1939.
- Ferranti, Giuseppe. Guida al territorio di Urbisaglia. Pro Manoscritto a cura di Urbsalviambiente. Urbisaglia, 1994.
- Mauro, Maurizio. La Rocca di Urbisaglia. Ravenna, 1994.
- Salvucci Miria - Salvucci Giovanna (et al. ). Urbisaglia. Urbs Salvia, Capolavori in corso. Urbisaglia, 2003.
