= Death of Jeanette Bishop and Gabriella Guerin =

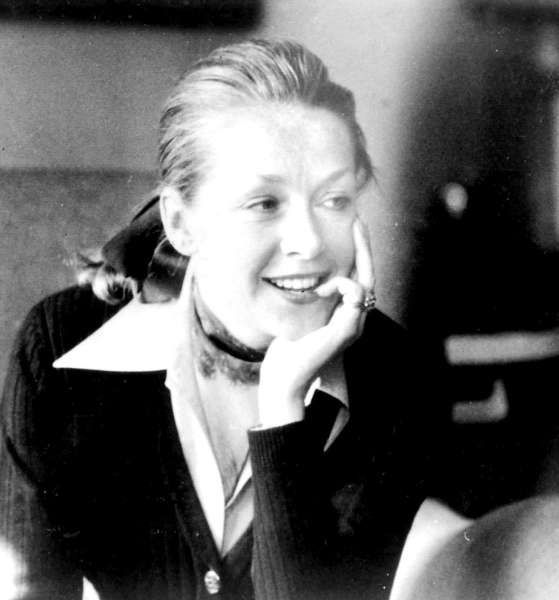
Jeanette Bishop

The death of Jeanette Bishop and Gabriella Guerin occurred sometime between 29 November 1980, when the two women were last seen in the Italian town of Sarnano, and 27 January 1982, when their remains were found near Lago di Fiastra in the Sibillini Mountains. How Bishop and Guerin met their deaths, what they were doing between their disappearance and the likely date of their deaths a month later, or even why the two ventured up into the mountains in snowy weather, is unknown. Although initially ruled deaths caused by hypothermia, by September 1989 the investigating prosecutor concluded it was a double murder by unknown perpetrators, using unknown means. Over the course of investigations, enquiries expanded to other countries, mostly to the European Union but also to Brazil and the United Kingdom, and encompassed possible connections to art theft, robbery and alleged blackmail plots.

== Background ==
Ellen Dorothy Jeanette Bishop was a 40-year-old former model, born on the Isle of Sheppey in Kent. At the time of her disappearance, she was married to Stephen Charles May but had previously been known by the surname Rothschild (Note: Press reports, especially in the Italian media, of Bishop's disappearance and following the discovery of her death, commonly refer to her as the "Baroness" or "Baronessa de Rothschild", alluding to her association with that family through her former marriage to Evelyn de Rothschild. No evidence is given that she was going by the Rothschild surname at the time of her disappearance, nor that she ever used the title Baroness. The Rothschild baronetcy was not held by Evelyn, nor by his father; rather, Sir Evelyn was knighted in 1989, more than 17 years after his marriage to Bishop ended. The wife – but not a former wife – of a (British) knight would be entitled to adopt the style Lady, as Rothschild's third wife, Lynn Forester, Lady de Rothschild, did.) through her first marriage to the financier, Evelyn de Rothschild. In November 1980, she was in the Sarnano area to organize renovations on a house she and May had recently purchased in the hamlet of Schito. With her was her longtime friend, assistant and interpreter, the Italian Gabriella Guerin, aged 39. On 29 November, Bishop and Guerin drove in their car, a Peugeot 104, up the mountain road towards Sassotetto, the highest hamlet of the Sarnano comune (municipality). That evening the weather conditions were poor, with a snowstorm that lasted until the next day.

== Investigations ==
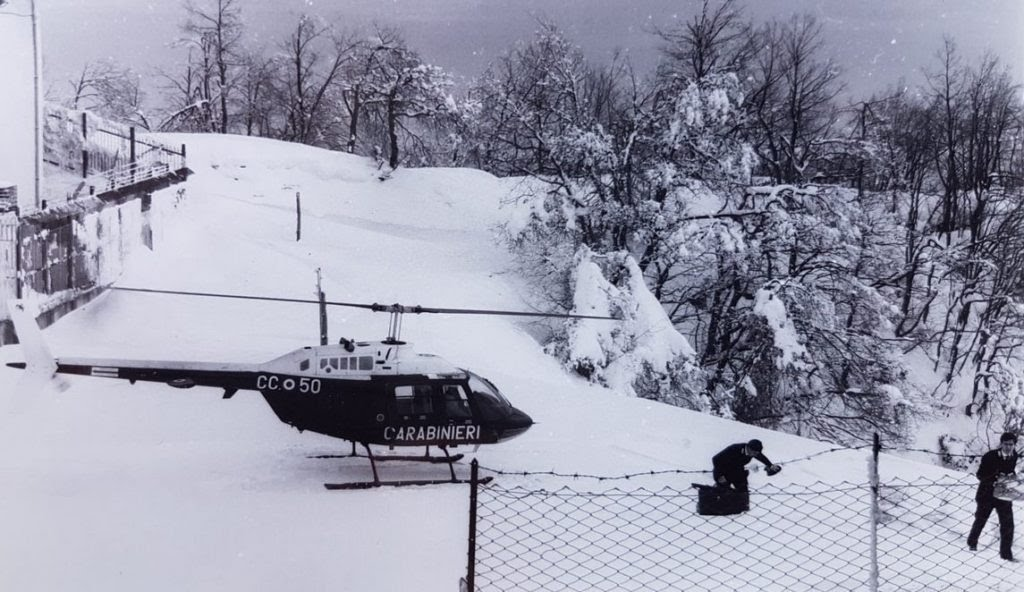
The Helicopter Squad carabinieri the day they found the car

=== Search ===
After the two women failed to return, a search was undertaken in December 1980 by the carabinieri helicopter unit of Ancona. Some three weeks after their disappearance, the aerial search located the car, parked―rather than abandoned—at the roadside near an unoccupied house. Footprints were found around the house and it was thought that Bishop and Guerin had used it as a refuge from the snowstorm. Inside, used dishes and the remains of a fire fueled with wooden furniture were found. The car was in complete working order and there were no signs of any struggle, assault or force.

=== Remains located ===
On 14 January 1982, Bishop's husband, Stephen May, offered a reward of $208,000 for anyone who found her alive, but on 18 January the carabinieri of Camerino, not finding any trace of the two women, hypothesized that they may have died from hypothermia; May did not believe this theory was likely. Only two weeks later, on 27 January, two hunters stumbled upon the personal belongings and largely decomposed bodies of the missing women in a forest, between Lago di Fiastra and the hermitage of San Liberato. The bones had been damaged by wild boars and some of them were missing. The autopsy revealed that both Bishop and Guerin had died at the site.

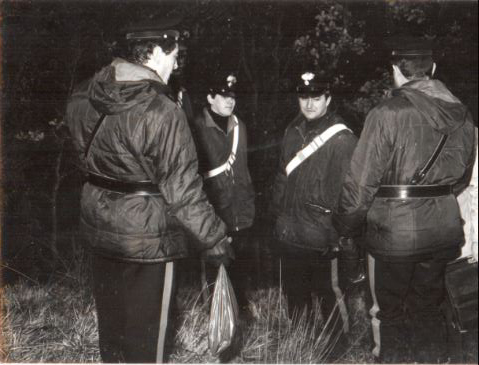
The Carabinieri find the remains of Bishop and Guerin

=== Christie's auction house case ===
In December 1982, the case was taken by the Macerata prosecutor, Alessandro Iacoboni, who investigated the case as a possible murder. At the same time, Scotland Yard was investigating the death of a Roman antique dealer, Sergio Vaccari, who was killed with fifteen stab wounds on 17 September 1982 in his apartment in Holland Park. This further complicated the case of the death of the two women, as it emerged that Bishop was one of the man's contacts; Bishop and Vaccari may have been connected with a theft from auction house Christie's, in Piazza Navona, which occurred the day after the two women were last seen. Telegrams, some incomprehensible and apparently coded, were found in the possession of Bishop; they contained correspondences to telegrams which had been sent to Christie's, disclosing details of the theft. On 25 September 1989, Iacoboni concluded that the case was attributable to a double homicide by unknown means and perpetrators.

== Aftermath ==
In the absence of any official resolution to the case, a number of highly speculative theories have been propounded in the media since the events. None of the unevidenced suppositions have been substantiated nor publicly given any credence by investigating authorities.

== Later developments ==
In 2006, the professor of molecular forensic diagnostics Franco Maria Venanzi, of the University of Camerino, was able to confirm through DNA examination, the identity of the body of Gabriella Guerin.

In November 2024, prosecutors in Macerata reopened the investigation into the double murder. Witnesses to events surrounding the women's disappearance renewed their testimony in public proceedings, in the hope that such re-examination uncovers previously overlooked leads in the case.
