= Fiastrone =

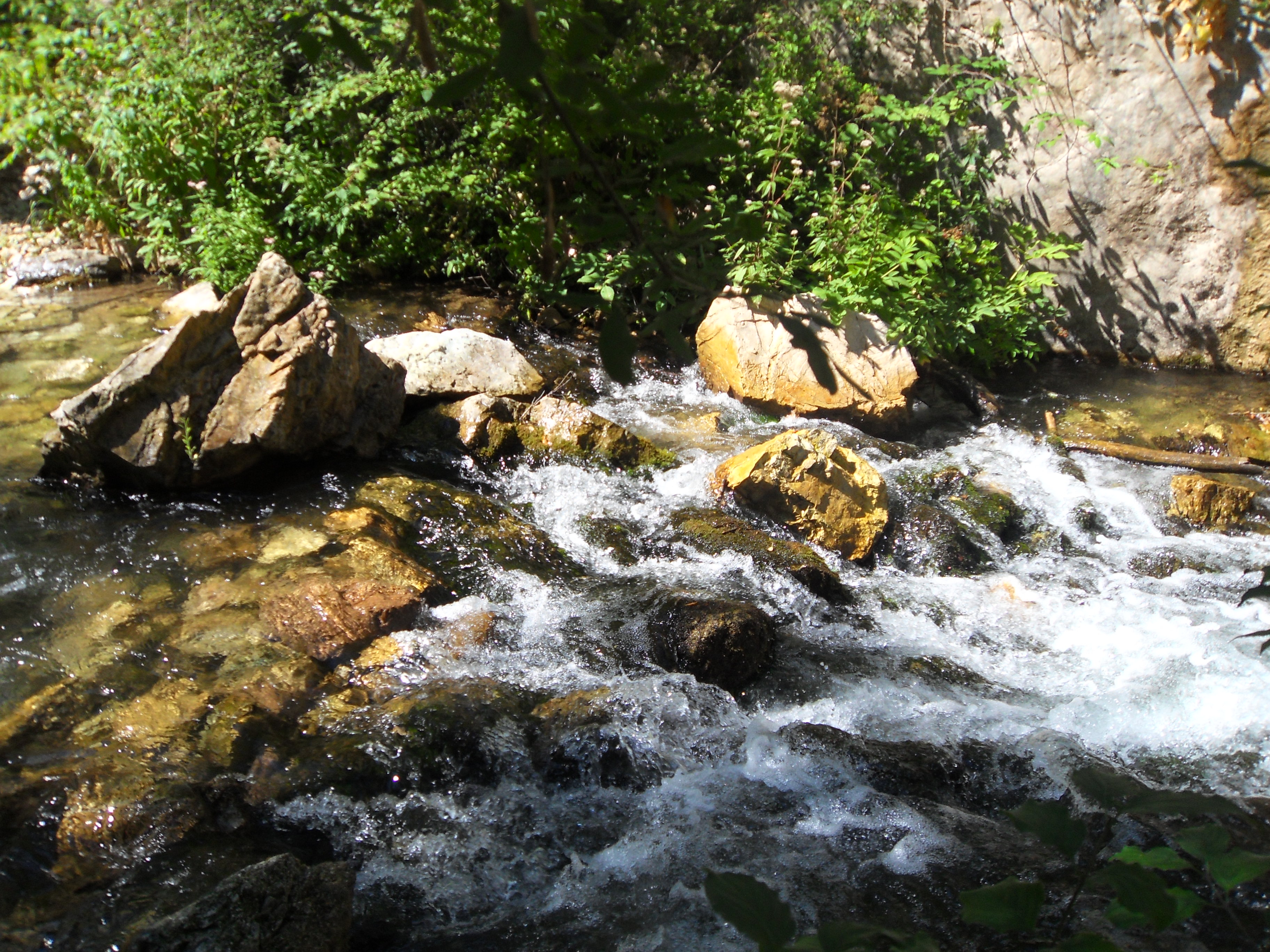
- Fiastrone

Location
- Country: Italy

Physical characteristics
- Source
  - location: near Bolognola
  - elevation: 1,700 m (5,600 ft)
- Mouth: Chienti
  - coordinates: 43°09′33″N 13°14′36″E
- Length: 34 km (21 mi)

Basin features
- Progression: Chienti→ Adriatic Sea

The Fiastrone is a river in the province of Macerata in the Marche region of Italy. Its source is in the Sibillini Mountains near Bolognola. The river flows northwest through the mountains before entering Lago di Fiastra. The river then exits the lake and flows northeast through the mountains. It then exits the mountains and Monti Sibillini National Park and flows north until it reaches the Chienti and enters that river by Belforte del Chienti.
