= Lucius Flavius Silva =

1st century AD Roman senator, commander and politician

Lucius Flavius Silva Nonius Bassus
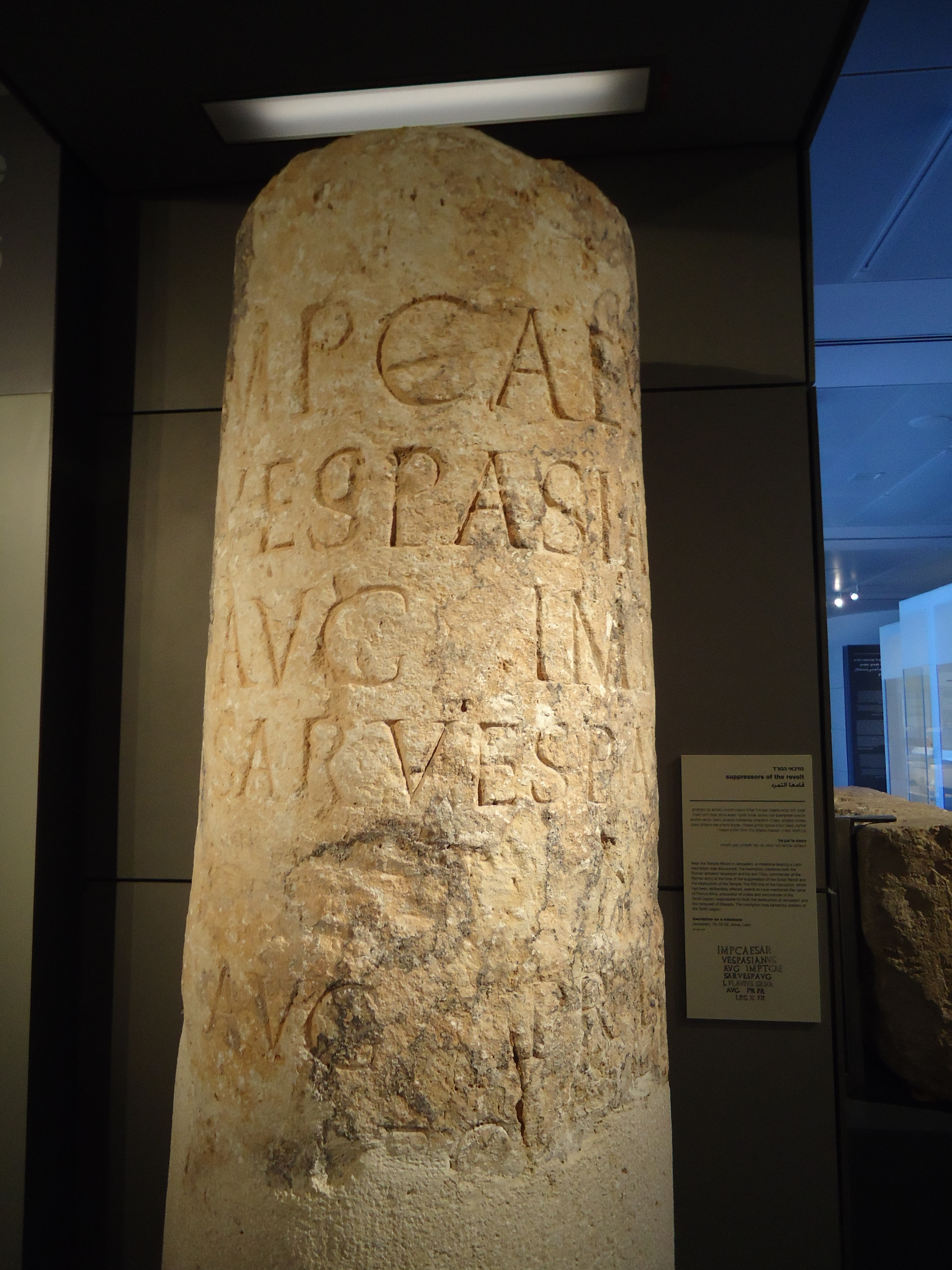

Legate of Iudaea
- In office 72–81
- Preceded by: Sextus Lucilius Bassus
- Succeeded by: Marcus Salvidienus

Personal details
- Born: c. 40 Urbisaglia, Italy, Roman Empire
- Died: c. 81 Rome, Italy, Roman Empire

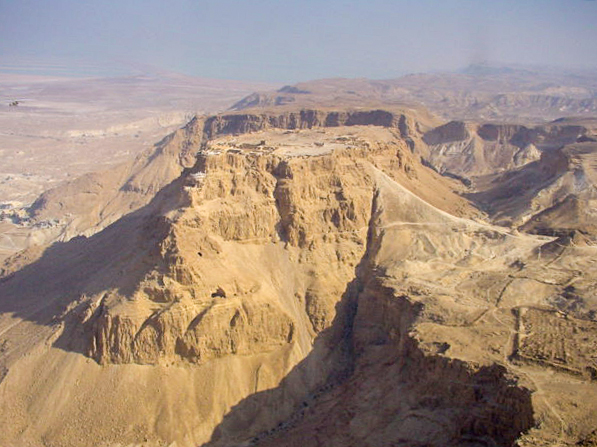
Masada

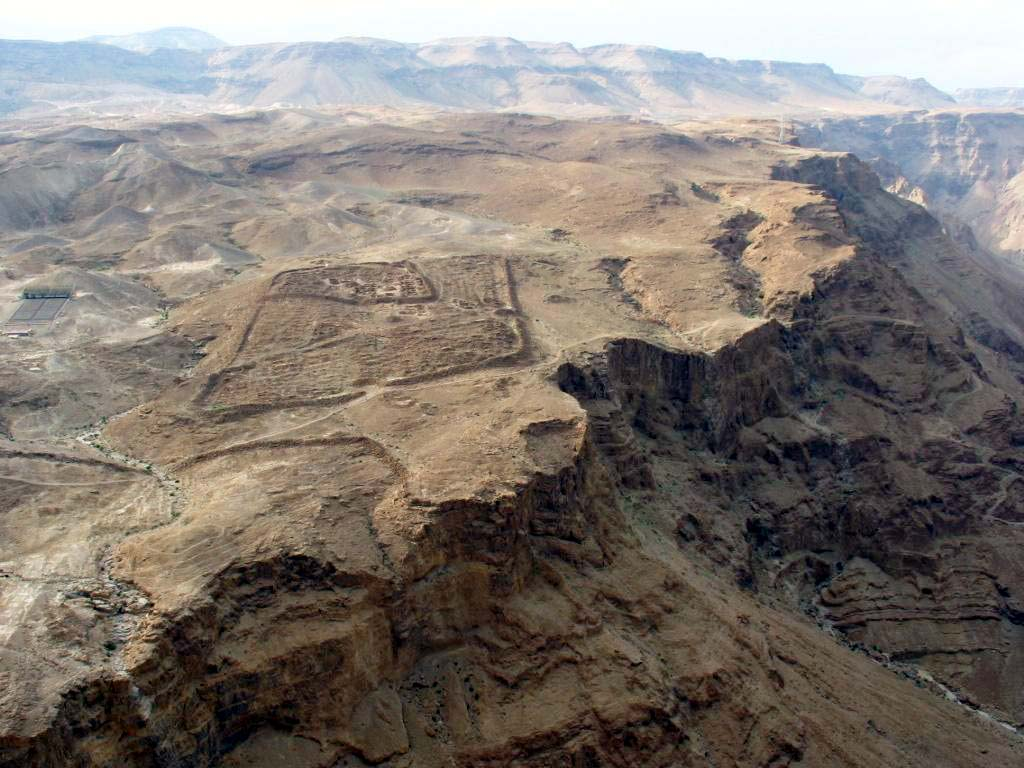
Remains of Roman camp F near Masada

Lucius Flavius Silva Nonius Bassus was a late-1st-century Roman general, governor of the province of Iudaea and consul. Silva was the commander of the army, composed mainly of the Legio X Fretensis, in 72 AD that laid siege to the near-impregnable mountain fortress of Masada, occupied by a group of Jewish rebels dubbed the Sicarii by Flavius himself. The siege ended in 73 AD with Silva's forces breaching the defenses of the Masada plateau and the mass suicide of the Sicarii, who preferred death to defeat or capture. Silva's actions are documented by 1st-century Jewish-Roman historian Josephus, the remains of a 1st-century Roman victory arch identified in Jerusalem in 2005, and the extensive earthworks at the Masada site, a monument to the high-water mark of Roman siege warfare.

== Early life and career ==
Flavius Silva was born in the Roman town of Urbs Salvia, in what is now Italy, circa AD 43. Around 62, he began his career within the vigintiviri, a preliminary and required first step toward gaining entry into the Roman Senate. The vigintiviri was a college of twenty citizens charged with administering municipal and government affairs within the government of Rome. As one of the triumviri capitalis, Silva was one of three responsible for assisting the judicial magistrates.

Next he served as military tribune of Legio IV Scythica around the year 64, when it was stationed in Syria; in 67 or 68 he was quaestor, the first stage of the cursus honorum allowing entry in the Senate; and around the year 70 he served as tribune of the plebs. Next he was appointed legate of the Legio XXI Rapax, which was stationed at Vindonissa, likely for his support of Vespasian in the Year of the Four Emperors.

Flavius Silva was patron of his home town Urbs Salvia, where he twice held the honorary position of praetor quinquennalis.

== Siege of Masada ==
The historical context of Silva's siege of Masada was Rome's 'cleaning up' of the remaining Jewish resistance to Roman rule after crushing the rebellion in Jerusalem in 70 AD. While Masada was the last vestige of the rebellion it was as much a symbol as a threat. Thus, the attack on Masada was as much for Roman prestige as security. Silva's forces were a projection of Roman power. Rome's 4,000 to 5,000 soldiers outnumbered the people on Masada — estimated by Josephus at 960 men, women and children — by 5 to 1.

The central challenge to Silva and his battlefield engineers was to overcome the isolated plateau and its fortifications, originally constructed by King Herod. Silva surrounded the mountain fortress by constructing a 1.8-metre-high (5.9 ft), 11-kilometre-long (11,000 m) siege wall (circumvallation) to prevent attacks and escapes. The wall also enclosed the eight base camps established for the army. After initial efforts to breach Masada's defenses failed, Silva's army built a siege ramp against the western face of the plateau, using thousands of tons of stones and beaten earth. The huge dirt ramp, which survives to this day, allowed the Romans to roll up a battering ram to breach Masada's walls. Silva's victory was incomplete. Some 960 men, women and children, had committed mass suicide shortly before the Romans took the fortress. However, the Romans had made their point and removed the last obstacle to reasserting their rule in Judaea.

== Later life ==
During the Census Vespasian and his son Titus performed between April and the end of June 73, Silva was adlected into Praetorian rank and to the Patrician class. Later that year he was appointed legatus Augusti pro praetore of Judaea, replacing Sextus Lucilius Bassus, who had died during his tenure. Silva was governor of Judea for eight years, until 79 or 80. By 1 January 81 he had returned to Rome, where he welcomed the year as ordinary consul, with Lucius Asinius Pollio Verrucosus as his colleague. Silva commissioned an amphitheater to be built in Urbs Salvia after the year 81 AD. The amphitheater was used for gladiatorial contests and other entertainments. In 1957 a stone inscription was found at the amphitheater which described Silva's various posts - tresvir capitalis, tribune, quality figures of the Legio IV Scythica, quaestor, tribune of the plebs and legatus legionis of the Legio XXI Rapax. The amphitheater is used to this day for annual drama festivals.

His life after his second consulate is unknown. After the death of emperor Titus, it is possible Silva fell victim to Domitian's reign of terror which purged popular generals whom the emperor saw as rivals. Falling into disfavour, Silva's accomplishments were erased from Roman archives in what Romans called damnatio memoriae.

== Archaeological finds ==
In October 2005, Hungarian archaeologist Dr. Tibor Grull published an article about a stone tablet unearthed in 1999 near the Temple Mount in Jerusalem. The Latin inscription on the tablet describes Silva as the victor of Masada. It is believed the tablet was part of the Roman restoration of Jerusalem after Rome's victory.

== On film & television ==
- Silva was portrayed by Peter O'Toole in the 1981 television mini-series Masada (where his character is incorrectly called 'Cornelius Flavius Silva').
- Lucius Flavius Silva was portrayed by Sam Hazeldine in the 2015 television mini-series The Dovekeepers.

Political offices
Preceded by Marcus Tittius Frugi, and Titus Vinicius Julianus as suffect consuls	Consul of the Roman Empire; 81 with Lucius Asinius Pollio Verrucosus	Succeeded by Marcus Roscius Coelius, and Gaius Julius Juvenalis as suffect consuls
