= San Biagio, Urbisaglia =

Church building in Urbisaglia, Italy

San Biagio is a Baroque-style, Roman Catholic church located on Via Sacrario in Urbisaglia, province of Macerata, in the region of Marche, Italy.

== History ==
A church in this town dedicated to St Blaise, and assigned to the Camaldolese Abbey of Fonte Avellana, was documented since 1195. In 1663, the ruinous state, led to tearing it down, and the materials re-used to restore the parish church of San Giorgio. In 1771, a church was rebuilt at the site in Baroque fashion. It was donated in the 1970s to the town and used as both a shrine to those fallen in the century's wars, and a military museum. The ceiling is frescoed with Gothic quadratura and starry sky with the monogram of St Bernardino of Siena in the center.
