= Rocca (fortification) =

Historical structure in Italy

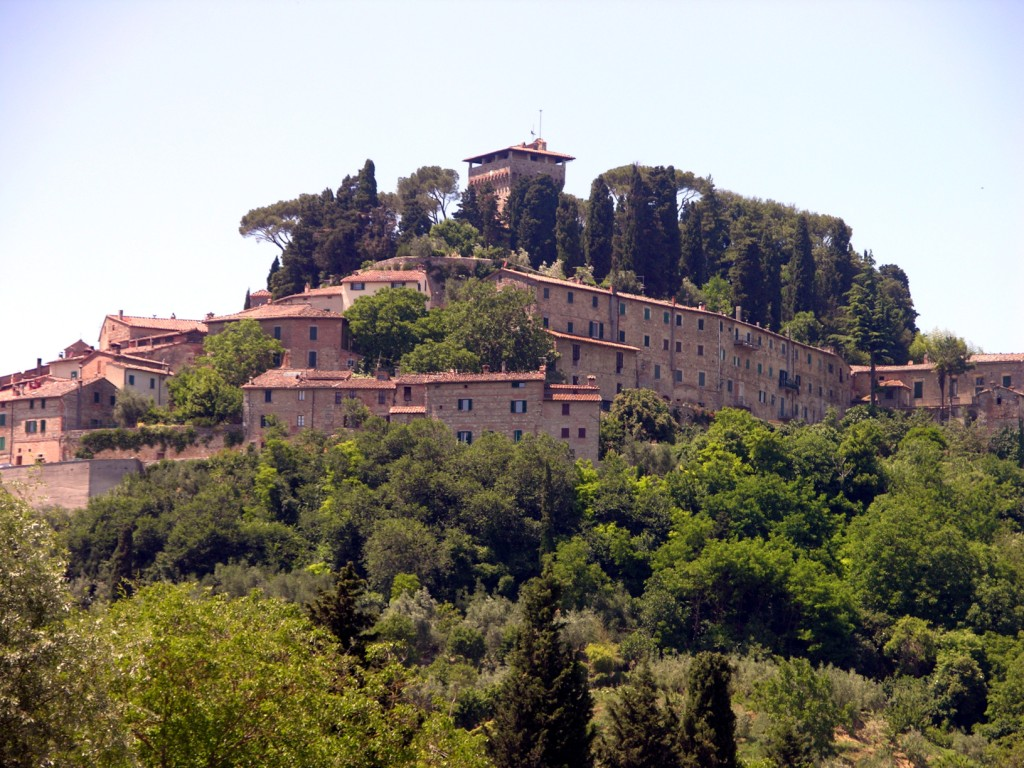
The Rocca of Cetona (province of Siena) dominates its village.

A rocca (lit. 'rock') is a type of Italian fortified stronghold or fortress, typically located on a hilltop, beneath or on which the inhabitants of a historically clustered village or town might take refuge in times of trouble. Generally under its owners' patronage, the settlement might hope to find prosperity in better times. A rocca might in reality be no grander than a fortified farmhouse. A more extensive rocca would be referred to as a castello (lit. 'castle').

The rocca in Roman times would more likely be a site of a venerable cult than a dwelling, like the high place of Athens, its Acropolis. Though the earliest documentation is not earlier than the eleventh century, it was during the Lombard times that farming communities, which had presented a Roman pattern of loosely distributed farmsteads or self-sufficient Roman villa, moved from their traditional places on the fringes of the best arable lands in river valleys, where they were dangerously vulnerable from the Roman roads, to defensive positions, such as had once been occupied by Etruscan settlements, before the settled conditions of the Pax Romana. Historian J.B. Ward-Perkins made the following observation regarding the rocca at the town of Falerii.

At Falerii ... the inhabitants simply transferred their town back from its Roman site on the open plateau to the old cliff-top site of Falerii Veteres, to which they gave the significant name of Civita Castellana, or "the Fortress Town"; just as in antiquity, security was once again the basic consideration.

Similarly, in Greek-speaking Campania, the inhabitants of Paestum finally abandoned their town after raids by Saracens and moved a few miles to the top of a cliff, calling the new settlement Agropoli (i.e., "acropolis"). Where such fortress villages were sited at the end of a ridge, protected on three sides by steep, cliff-like escarpments, the rocca was often sited to control the narrow access along the crest of the spur.

Locally the term rocca simply designates the local fortified high place.

== Examples ==
Specific examples show the range of structures that may be called a rocca:

- Rocca Sanvitale, began in the 13th century, mostly completed by the 15th century, is a remarkable fortress house in the comune (municipality) of Fontanellato, near Parma.
- Rocca Flea is a fortified palazzo in the comune of Gualdo Tadino, in the Umbria region.
- In Valletta, Malta, Casa Rocca Piccola is one of the last remaining unconverted palazzi, that is still lived in today by a noble family.
- In Sardinia, the Rocca Doria, a stronghold of the Doria of Genoa, gives its name to the commune Monteleone Rocca Doria.

From the earliest stage, when church and rocca were the only stone structures, "the distinction between 'castles' and 'villages' is already one of degree rather than kind". (Ward-Perkins 1962:401). Their protective rocca has extended its name to many other small communities:

- Roccacasale is a comune in the province of L'Aquila, in the Abruzzo region.
- Rocca di Papa in the region called Castelli Romani in the hills surrounding Lazio has given its name to its comune. Twelfth-century documents name the Castrum Rocce de Papa ("Rock Castle of the Pope"), because here lived Pope Eugene III.
- Rocca Sinibalda is a comune in the province of Rieti, in the Lazio region, located about 50 km northeast of Rome.
- Rocca Canterano, Rocca Priora, Rocca Massima, Rocca di Cave, Rocca Santo Stefano, Rocca d'Arce are also comuni in the Lazio region.
- Rocca Grimalda is a comune in the province of Alessandria, in the Piedmont region; it was a nest of bandits in the eighteenth century. Rocca Canavese, Rocca Cigliè, Rocca d'Arazzo, Rocca de' Baldi are also comuni in the Piedmont region.
- Rocca Pietore is a comune in the province of Belluno, in the Veneto region
- Roccaraso is a comune in the province of L'Aquila, in the Abruzzo region.
- Rocca Susella and Rocca de' Giorgi are in the province of Pavia, in the Lombardy region.
- Rocca di Manerba del Garda, in the comune of Manerba del Garda, in the Lombardy region.
- Castelvecchio di Rocca Barbena is a comune in the province of Savona, in the in Liguria region.
- Rocca San Casciano is a comune in the province of Forlì-Cesena, in the Emilia-Romagna region.
- Rocca San Giovanni is a comune in the province of Chieti, in the Abruzzo region.
- Rocca d'Evandro is a comune in the province of Caserta, in the Campania region.
- Rocca Pia is a comune in the province of L'Aquila, in the Abruzzo region.
- Rocca Imperiale is a comune in the province of Cosenza, in the Calabria region.
- Rocca di Urbisaglia is a 16th-century military fortification in Urbisaglia, in the Marche region.
