= Urbisaglia =

- Comune
- Comune di Urbisaglia
- Coat of arms

- Location within Italy Location within Marche
- Coordinates: 43°12′N 13°23′E
- Country: Italy
- Region: Marche
- Province: Macerata

Area
  - Total: 2 km^{2} (0.77 sq mi)
- Elevation: 310 m (1,020 ft)

Population (2018-01-01)
  - Total: 2,577
  - Density: 1,300/km^{2} (3,300/sq mi)
- Time zone: UTC+1 (CET)
  - Summer (DST): UTC+2 (CEST)
- Website: Official website

Urbisaglia (Italian pronunciation: [urbiˈzaʎʎa, -ˈsaʎ-]) is a comune (municipality) in the province of Macerata, Marche, Italy. Its name comes from the ancient Roman town of Urbs Salvia, which is now in an archaeological park.

== History ==
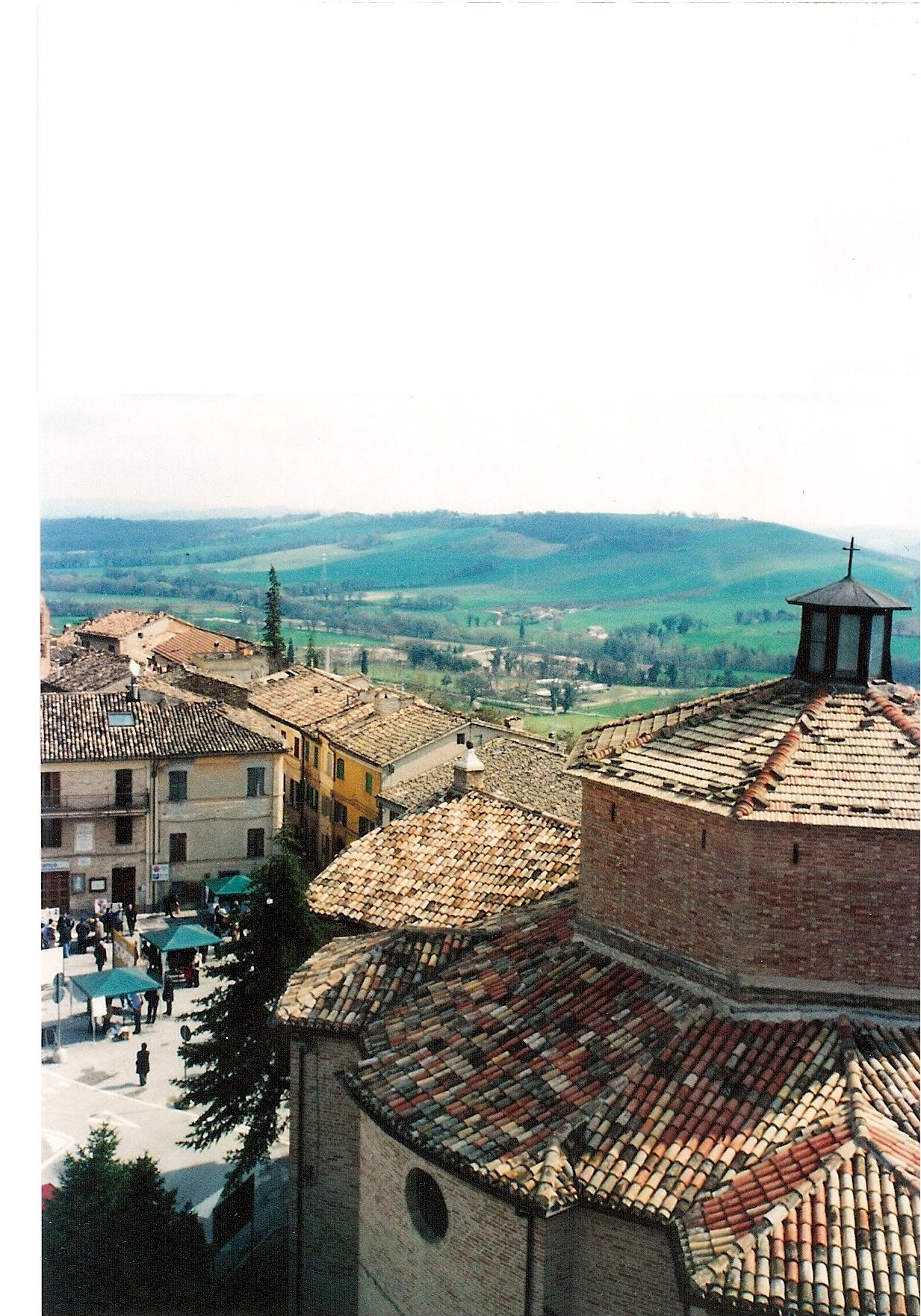
Urbisaglia landscape from the Rocca

The ancient town was founded during the 2nd century BC as a Roman colonia. It gave birth to some leading figures of the Roman Empire, such as the consul Gaius Fufius Geminus, and Lucius Flavius Silva Nonius Bassus the conqueror of Masada.

It was utterly destroyed by Alaric in 408–10 AD.

During the following centuries, the inhabitants of Urbs Salvia gradually moved to the top of the hill, giving rise to the Castro de Orbesallia. In the 12th century, a very important religious, economic and cultural centre was founded nearby, the Abbey of Fiastra, which had to influence the Fiastra Valley and the surrounding area.

Between the 12th and 14th centuries, the town was ruled by the Abbracciamonte family which slowly sold the town to the Comune of Tolentino, which became its only owner. After Francesco Sforza's signoria (1433–43), Urbisaglia came back under the domination of Tolentino, which was given papal permission to build a rocca, to prevent any rebellion attempt; in 1507 Tolentino sent a 12-soldier garrison to defend the fortress. In 1569, after petitioning Pope Pius V, the inhabitants of Urbisaglia were given autonomy from Tolentino; the town was directly placed under the Holy See's dependency.

The first excavations in the Roman town took place during the papal government. After Italy's unification the standard of living improved thanks to industrial development, permitting the rise of a spinning mill and both a hosiery and a soap factory.

Thanks to the benefactors Angelo Buccolini, Innocenzo Petrini and the marquis Alessandro Giannelli, the town was provided with a nursery school, an old people's home and a Mount of piety.

=== World War II ===
During Fascist era the town was given the name of "Urbisaglia Bonservizi" in honour of Nicola Bonservizi, a journalist born in Urbisaglia and a collaborator of Mussolini, killed in Paris by an anarchist. Urbisaglia was the site of an internment camp throughout the Second World War, which was placed at Giustiniani Bandini Palace, next to the Abbey of Fiastra. It remained active from June 1940 until October 1943. The internees were about a hundred, mostly Jews, from Italy, but also refugees from Germany, Austria, and the Balkans. In October 1943, a German unit took over the camp and prisoners who failed to flee were sent to the Fossoli di Carpi camp, last stop for Jews deported to Auschwitz extermination camp.

==== PG 53 Sforzacosta ====
In July 1942, a large prisoner-of-war camp was established at a disused linen factory at Casette Verdini, to the southwest of the settlement of Sforzacosta, about 1 mile (1.6 km) from the Urbisaglia Sforzacosta railway. It was known as P.G. (prigionieri di guerra) 53. Up to 10,000 prisoners were housed there.

=== Catholic diocese ===
In 1968 it became a titular diocese of the Catholic Church. Archbishop Georg Gänswein, apostolic nuncio in Lithuania, Estonia and Latvia, is the current holder of the title.

== Description ==
Today Urbisaglia has a population of over 2,700, working in agriculture, arts and crafts, textiles, power plants, and the iron and steel industry.

== Main sights ==
=== Religious buildings ===
- San Biagio: baroque church housing Monumento a Caduti and Weaponry and Military Uniforms Museum
- Chiesa della Maestà, Urbisaglia
- Abbey of Chiaravalle di Fiastra
- San Lorenzo Collegiate church
- Chiesa dell'Addolorata

=== Secular buildings ===
- Archaeological Park of Urbs Salvia
- Rocca di Urbisaglia

=== Archaeological Park of Urbs Salvia ===
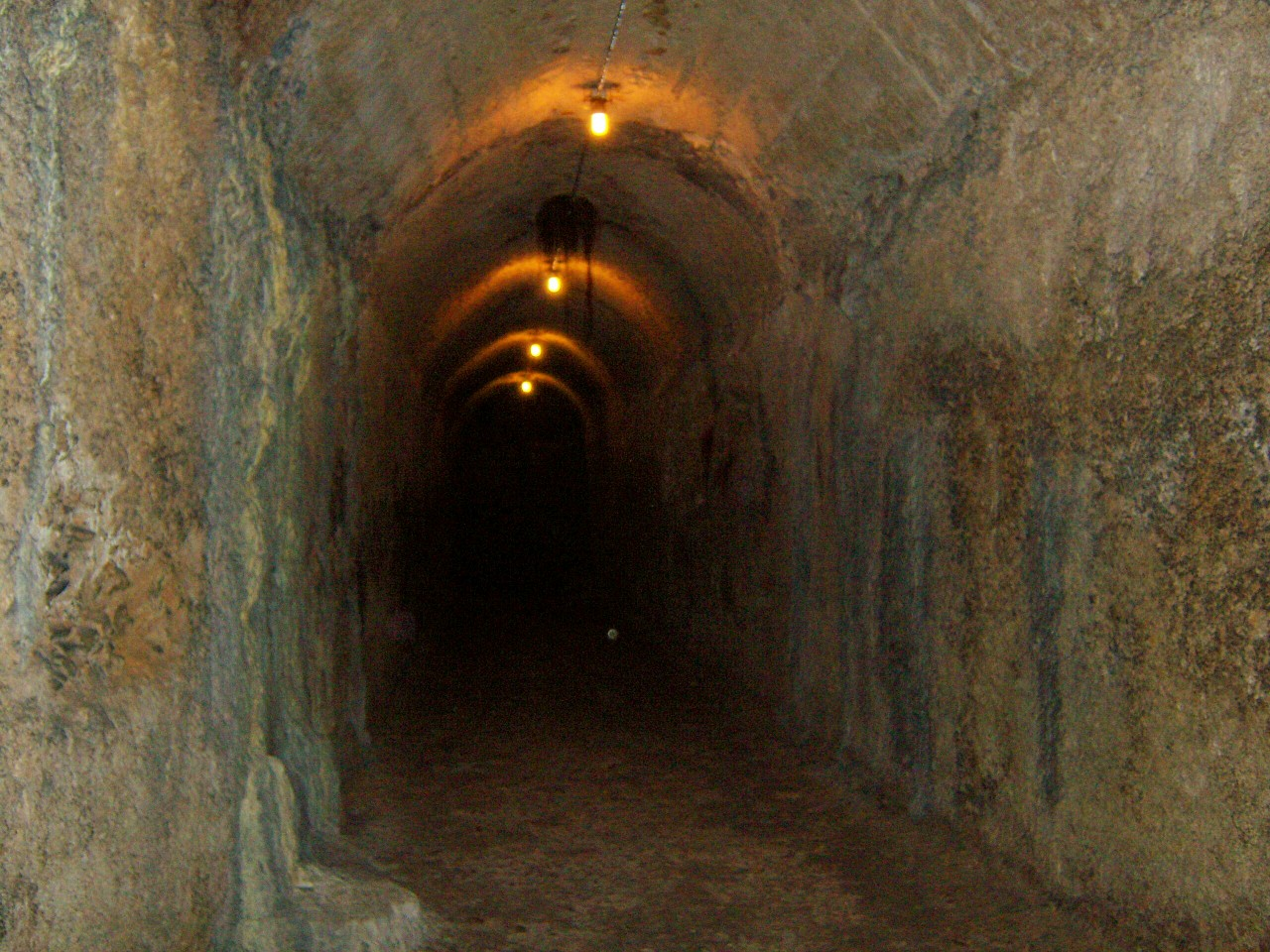
Reservoir of the Roman aqueduct in Urbs Salvia

Officially recognized as archaeological park in 1994, it spread over an area of about 40 hectares (100 acres), and it is the most important one in the Marche.
Just outside the medieval city walls, a walk descends through the park for about 1.5 kilometres (0.93 mi). It affords views of the scale and topography of the ancient town, starting at the top of the hill and reaching the flat valley bottom, bounded on the east side by the Fiastra river.
You can visit the Reservoir, the Theatre, the Niched Building, the Sanctuarial complex Temple-Criptoporticus dedicated to the goddess Salus Augusta and the Amphiteatre built by Lucius Flavius Silva Nonius Bassus. The city walls are well visible too, preserved along several hundred metres.

Every year in July and August, a season of classical drama takes place at the amphitheatre.

=== Rocca di Urbisaglia ===
The medieval fortress of Urbisaglia was a military fortification erected by the town of Tolentino at the beginning of the 16th century.
It was built upon the ruins of previous fortifications on the west corner of the Roman wall of Urbs Salvia. Its imposing position at the centre of the urban area suggests that the Arx (the citadel, the most protected area of the town) or the Capitol of the Roman town was once located here, as demonstrated by substantial remains of Roman walls and of composite concrete.

It has a trapezoidal shape with the longest side facing away from the town in order to better face potential attacks. There are four corner towers, a gate tower and a keep where the garrison Tolentino had imposed on Urbisaglia resided. Indeed, the fortress's main function, other than to control the surrounding areas, was to guard the town and to prevent any rebellious acts from the citizens of Urbisaglia who resented Tolentino's power over them.

== Sources and references ==
- Bacchielli L., Ch. Delplace, W. Eck, L. Gasperini, G. Paci. Studi su Urbisaglia romana. Supplementi a PICUS. Tivoli, 1995.
- Giuseppe Ferranti. Guida al territorio di Urbisaglia. Pro Manoscritto a cura di Urbsalviambiente. Urbisaglia, 1994
- Miria Salvucci, Giovanna Salvucci (et al. ). Urbisaglia. Urbs Salvia, Capolavori in corso. Urbisaglia, 2003.

== See also ==
- Archaeological Park of Urbs Salvia
- Rocca di Urbisaglia
- Abbey of Chiaravalle di Fiastra
