= Fiastra (river) =

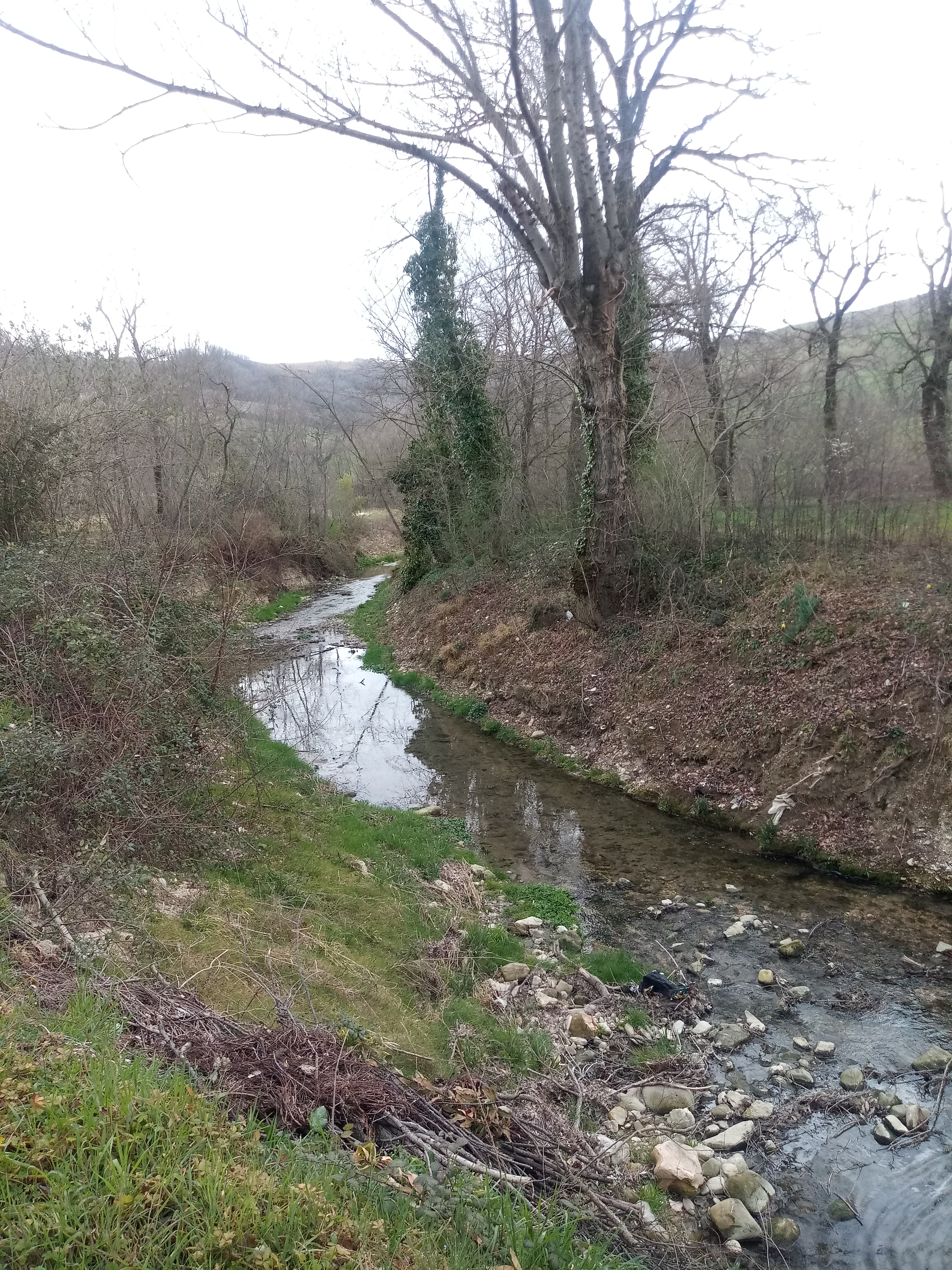

Location
- Country: Italy

Physical characteristics
- Source
  - location: Sibillini Mountains
  - elevation: 1,200 m (3,900 ft)
- Mouth: Chienti
  - coordinates: 43°15′59″N 13°28′28″E
- Length: 40 km (25 mi)
- Basin size: 300 km^{2} (120 sq mi)
- Discharge
  - average: 3.5 m^{3}/s (120 cu ft/s)

Basin features
- Progression: Chienti→ Adriatic Sea

The Fiastra is a river in the province of Macerata in the Marche region of Italy. Its source is in the Sibillini Mountains in Monti Sibillini National Park near Sarnano. It flows northeast near San Ginesio, Loro Piceno and Urbisaglia before entering the Chienti south of Macerata. The historic Abbadia di Fiastra is located near the river.
