= Lago di Fiastra =

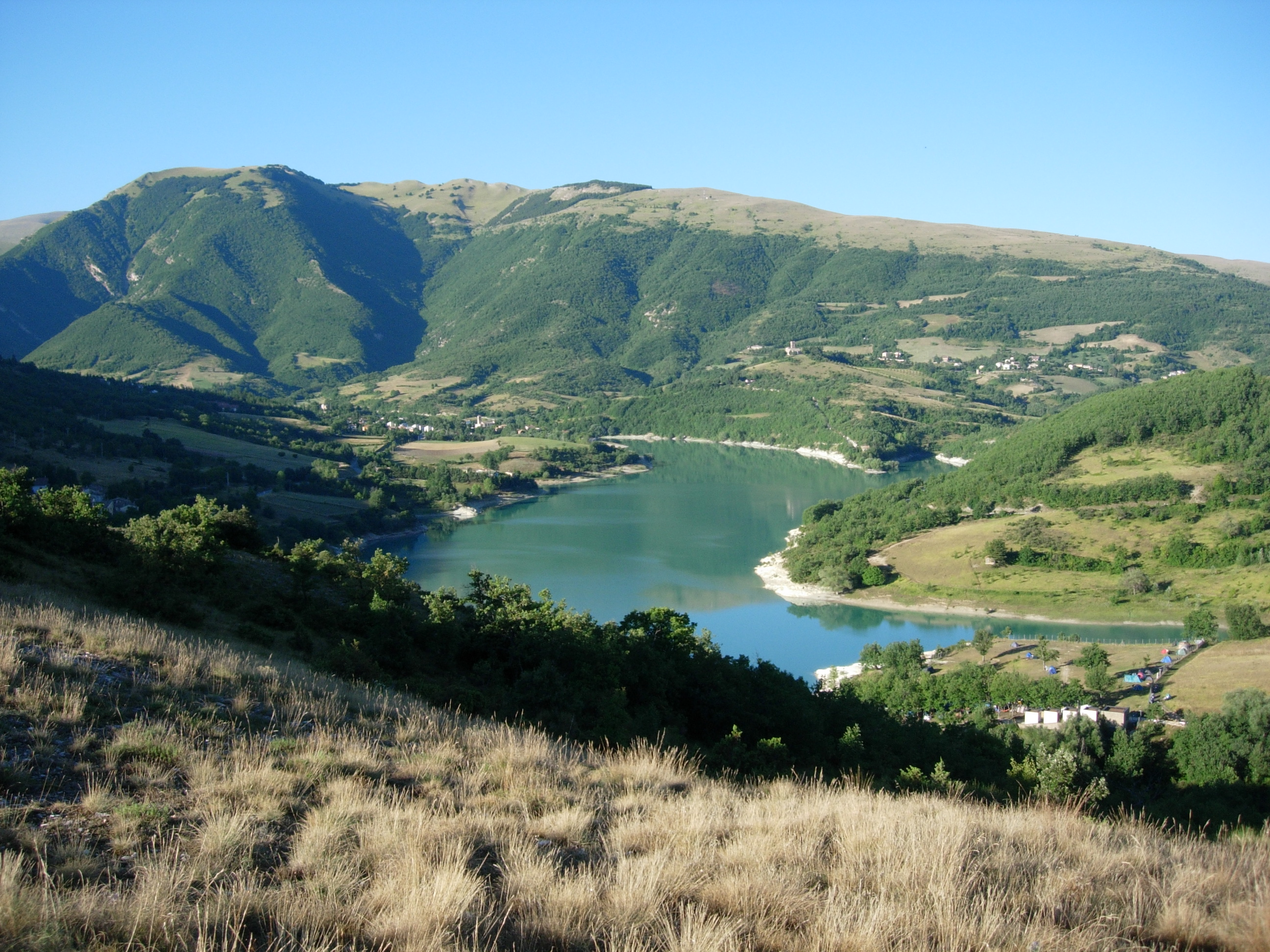
- Lago di Fiastra

- Location within Marche
- Location: Province of Macerata
- Coordinates: 43°02′59″N 13°10′13″E
- Type: reservoir
- Primary inflows: Fiastrone
- Primary outflows: Fiastrone
- Catchment area: 88 km^{2} (34 sq mi)
- Basin countries: Italy
- Built: 1955
- Surface area: 2 km^{2} (0.77 sq mi)
- Max. depth: 87 m (285 ft)
- Water volume: 0.204 km^{3} (0.049 cu mi)
- Surface elevation: 641 m (2,103 ft)

Lago di Fiastra is a reservoir in the province of Macerata in the Marche region of Italy. It was created in 1955. The Fiastrone flows into the reservoir from the south and exits the reservoir in the northeast part of the lake. The lake is located within Monti Sibillini National Park.
