= Chienti =

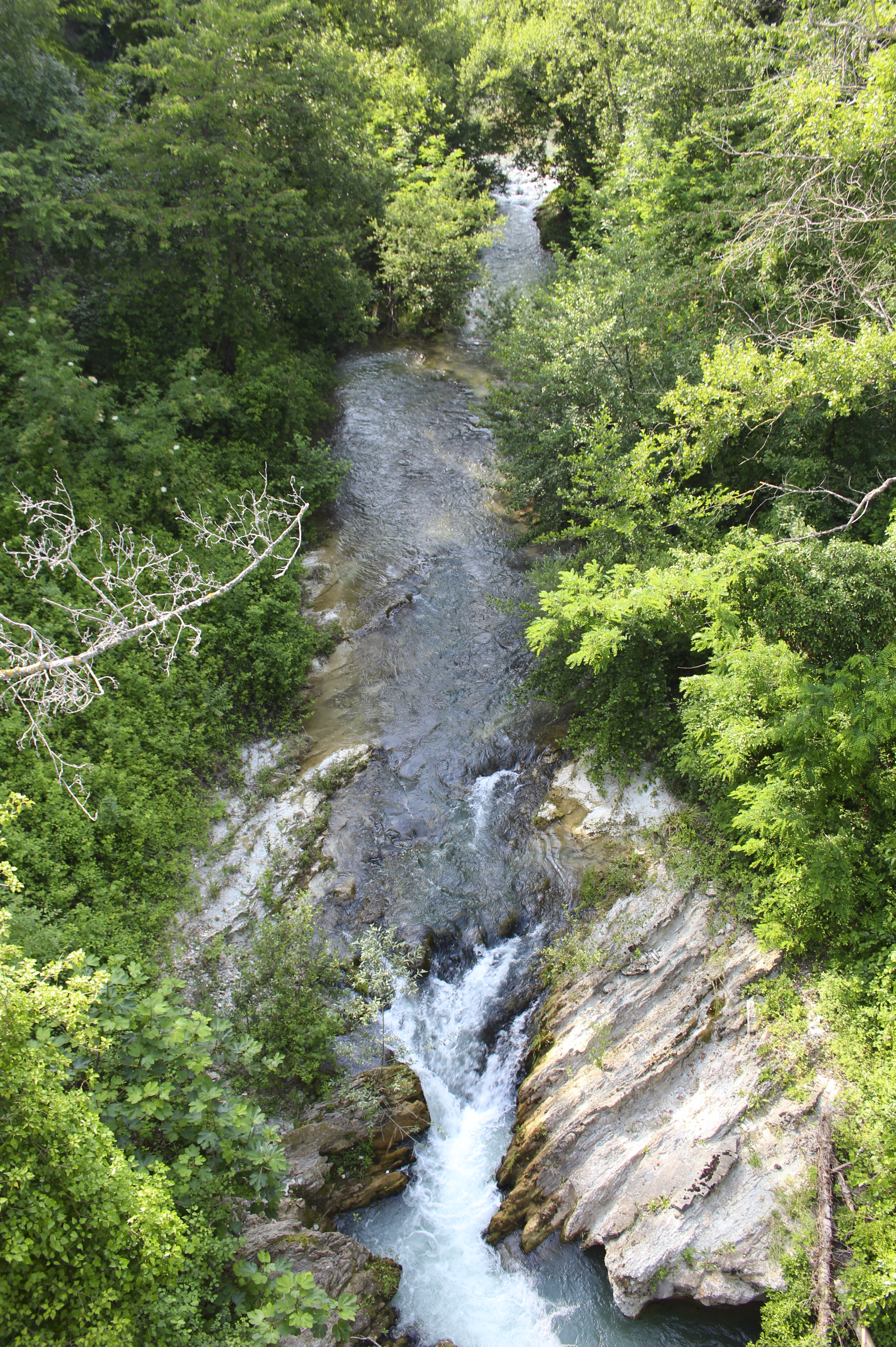

Location
- Country: Italy

Physical characteristics
- Source
  - location: Serravalle di Chienti in the Appennino Umbro-Marchigiano
  - elevation: 860 m (2,820 ft)
- Mouth: Adriatic Sea
  - location: Civitanova Marche
  - coordinates: 43.2944°N 13.7425°E
- Length: 91 km (57 mi)
- Basin size: 1,298 km^{2} (501 sq mi)
- Discharge
  - average: 7.6 m^{3}/s (270 cu ft/s)

The Chienti is a river in the Marche region of Italy. Its source is near Serravalle di Chienti in the Appennino Umbro-Marchigiano mountains in the province of Macerata. The river flows northeast through the mountains past Muccia and enters and exits a small reservoir before entering Lago di Pievefavera. After exiting Lago di Pievefavera, the river continues flowing northeast before being joined by the Fiastrone at Belforte del Chienti. The river continues flowing northeast past Tolentino before being joined by the Fiastra south of Macerata. The river flows east near Corridonia and forms the border between the province of Macerata and the province of Fermo before flowing into the Adriatic Sea near Civitanova Marche.
