= Archaeological Park of Urbs Salvia =

Archaeological site in Urbisaglia, Italy

Urbs Salvia
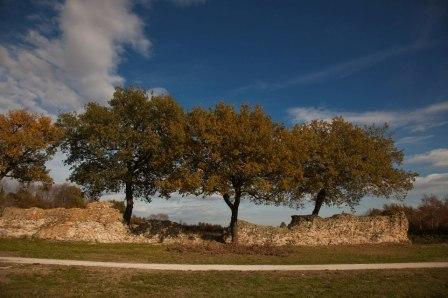
- Walls of Urbs Salvia-north side

- Location within Italy
- 43°11′53.3″N 13°23′7.1″E
- Type: Settlement
- Periods: Roman Republic - Byzantine Empire
- Cultures: Ancient Rome
- Location: Urbisaglia
- Region: Picenum

History
- Built: 2nd century BC
- Abandoned: 6th century

Site notes
- Area: 40 ha (99 acres)
- Owner: Public
- Management: Soprintendenza per i Beni Archeologici delle Marche
- Public access: Yes

The Archaeological Park of Urbs Salvia is situated in the comune of Urbisaglia (Province of Macerata), in the Marches, Italy. It is the largest archaeological park in the region.

== History ==
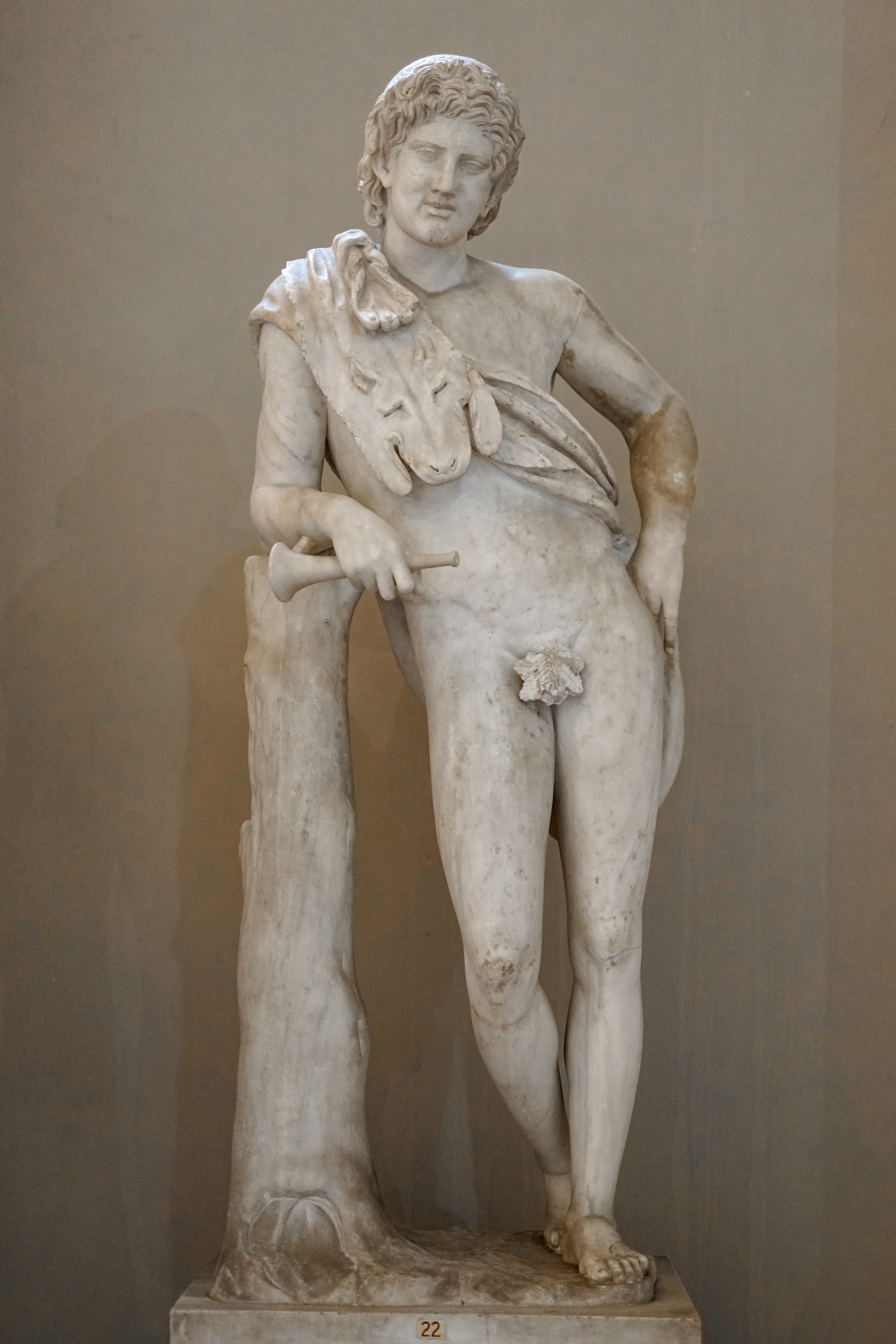
Satyr from Urbs Salvia, II sec AD (Vatican museums)

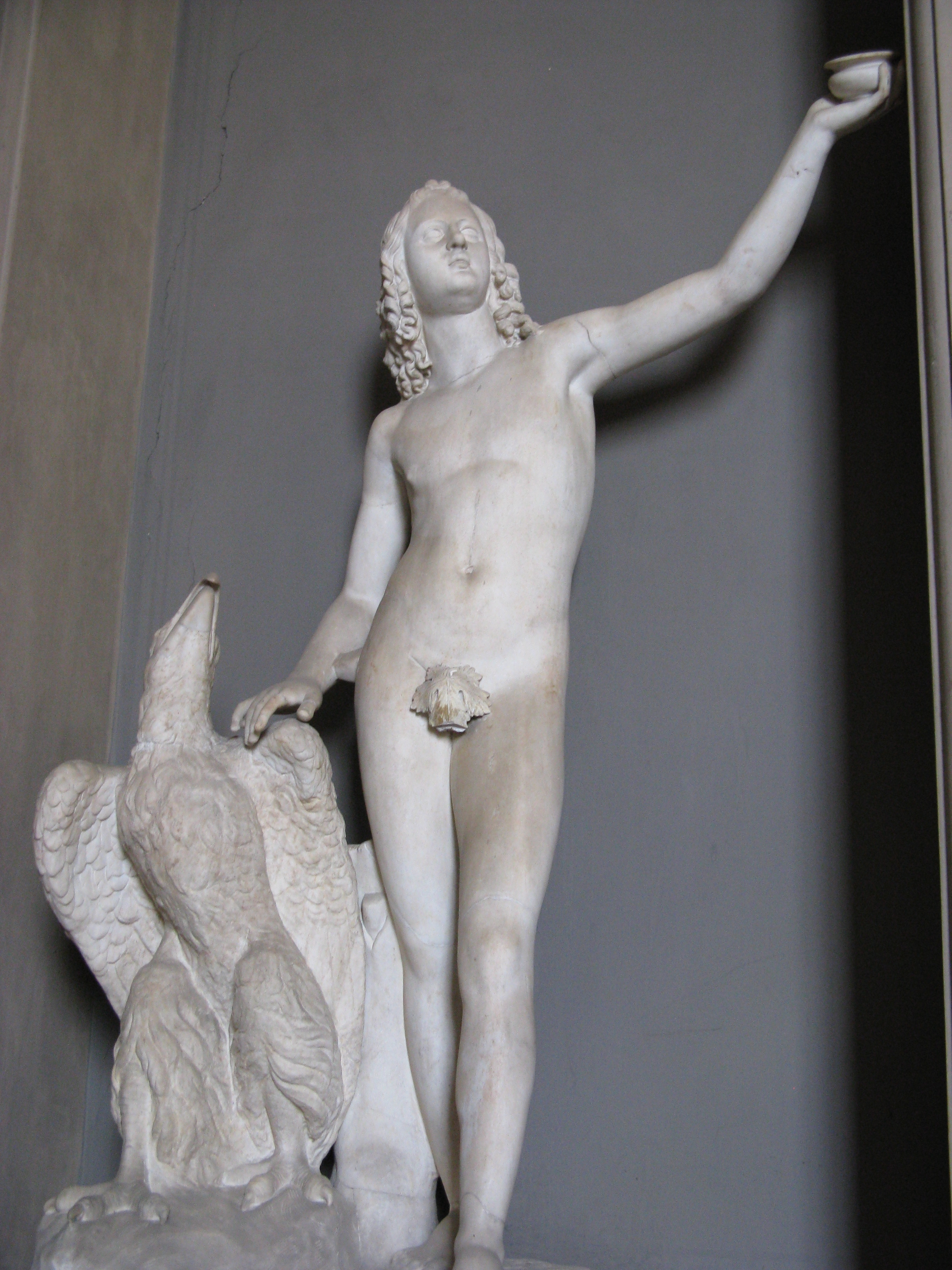
Ganymede and Zeus' eagle from Urbs Salvia (Vatican museums)

The city was founded as a colonia during the 2nd century BC. It was in the Roman province of Picenum and on the via Salaria Gallica. Its monuments were largely built under Augustus and Tiberius.. It was later the birthplace of some leading figures of the Roman Empire, such as the consul Gaius Fufius Geminus and Lucius Flavius Silva Nonius Bassus.

Urbs Salvia was sacked by the Visigoths in 408–10 AD, and suffered destruction over the years from earthquakes and plundering.

The decadence of the town is described by the poet Dante Alighieri (1265–1321) in his Divine Comedy (Paradiso, XVI, 73–78):

If Luni thou regard, and Urbisaglia,
How they have passed away, and how are passing
Chiusi and Senigallia after them,

To hear how races waste themselves away
Will seem to thee no novel thing nor hard
Seeing that even cities have an end.

== Archaeological Park ==
The Archaeological Park of Urbs Salvia is exceptional for the ease with which the overall building plan can be deciphered. The itinerary starts at the Archaeological Museum which houses, among other things, epigraphs, statues and portraits that were excavated in Urbisaglia from the middle of the 18th century onwards.

=== Reservoir ===
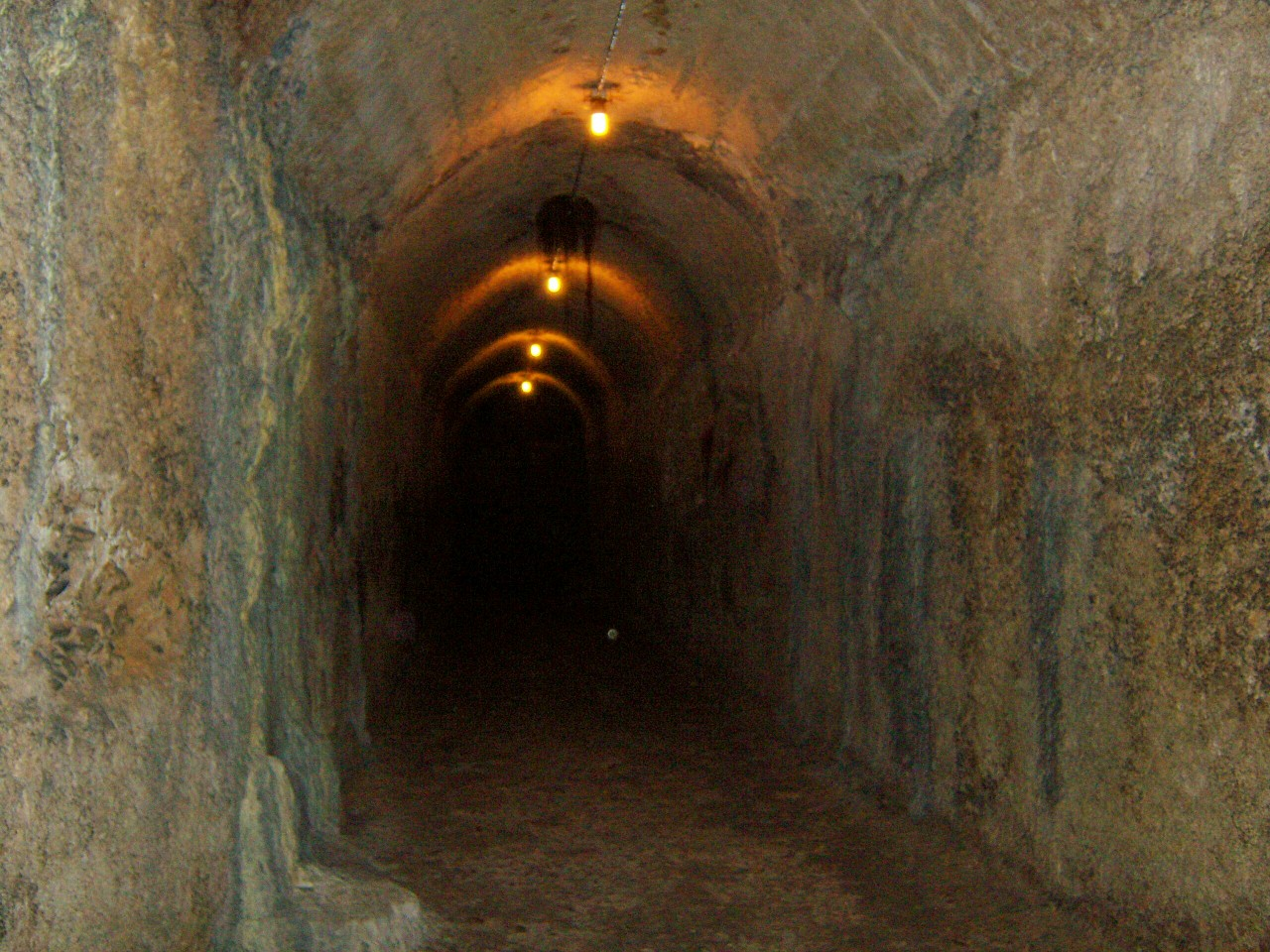
Reservoir, Urbs Salvia

Just outside the medieval city walls, on the highest point of the site, you can find the large reservoir collecting and cleaning the water coming from the Roman Aqueduct of Urbs Salvia. It was formed by an underground vaulted conduit with lateral walls made of bricks (opus latericium). The ancient aqueduct ran under the top of this hill and was about 1.5 km long. It had a gentle and constant slope so that it could carry water from a spring situated at the opposite side of the present-day Urbisaglia into this structure. The cisterns consist of two barrel vaulted tunnels connected at both ends, with internal walls covered by hydraulic mortar. The whole structure was built in opus caementicium (Roman concrete). Each tunnel was about 51 m long, 2.90 m wide and 4.10 m high and had a capacity of about 1,000 cubic metres of water.
The reservoir provided the whole town with spring water and it was situated in the highest area inside Urbs Salvia so that it could be powered only by gravity. In the reservoir are still visible:

- the water outlet: the opening through which water was distributed to the town. The pipes (fistulae) were made of lead;
- the ventilation shafts (lumina): a series of openings in the vault for air exchange, check of level and quality of water and periodical maintenance (manual cleaning of the internal walls);
- the water inlet: whence water flowed inside. It is formed by one of the ends of the aqueduct and shows a very thick layer of water deposit (calcium carbonate);
- traces of the planks utilized to build the vaults are still visible at some parts.

=== From the theatre to the amphitheatre ===
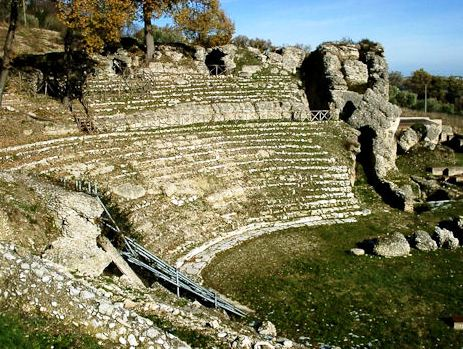
Roman theatre of Urbs Salvia

The imposing Roman theatre was built in 23 AD on the Hellenic model. The structure presents a cavea (auditorium) divided into three tiers of seats with entrances on the different levels. Around the cavea is a corridor with steps running to the top, where there was a sacellum (small temple). Of the original stage the lower part of the walling is preserved; behind the stage is an artificial terrace which was framed by a colonnade supported by solid brick wall.

At the foot of the hill, conveniently placed alongside the via Salaria Gallica (i.e., the main line of communication in the Picenum, here matching up with the cardo maximus of the town), was the sanctuary-complex. The main temple had a six-column facade. What remains of the original structure is part of the podium lacking the white limestone slabs with which it was originally paved. It was dedicated to the Salus Augusta (protector goddess of the Emperor), and was probably used for the imperial cult promoted by Tiberius, successor of Augustus. The temple is enclosed by a porticus made up of four underground galleries with frescoes in the 3rd Pompeiian style. The frescoes represent haunting animals, masks, and pictures connected with Augustus' political propaganda (trophies). Next to the main temple there is a smaller one. Behind it there is an area which was probably devoted to the ritual use of water, and behind the main temple there is a via munita, corresponding to the first East cardo.

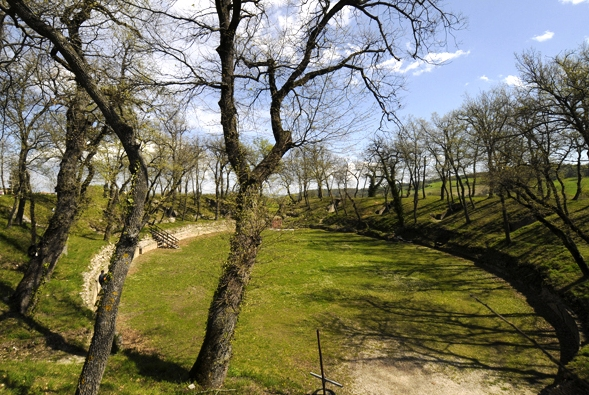
Roman amphiteatre of Urbs Salvia

Just outside the city walls, there are two funeral monuments and the amphitheatre, one of the best preserved examples of this type in the Marche region. The amphitheatre was built after the year 81 AD by the Urbisalvian Titus' military general Lucius Flavius Silva Nonius Bassus, who captured the Masada fortress in Palestine. The amphitheatre was used for gladiatorial contests and other entertainments. All its perimeter is preserved up to the first seating level, including the first level of the vomitoria (the exit-ways) and the bases of the pillars of the external corridor. In its original form it probably had three tiers of seats. The external wall of the cavea (auditorium) had a series of semicircular niches which later formed the supports of the stairs to the entrances on the upper floors. The arena is 59m long and 35m wide. The two entrances at the major axis of the elliptical amphitheatre were for the gladiators.

== See also ==
- List of Roman amphitheatres

== Sources ==
- Bacchielli L. - Ch. Delplace - W. Eck - L. Gasperini - G. Paci. Studi su Urbisaglia romana. Supplementi a PICUS. Tivoli, 1995.
- Bertini, Adelaide - Giuseppe Ferranti - Miria Salvucci (et al. ). Abati e feudatari nella Valle del Fiastra. Urbisaglia, 1996.
- Capodaglio, Giuseppina. Statue e ritratti di età romana da Urbs Salvia. Pollenza, 1994.
- Capodaglio, Giuseppina - Fabrizio Cipolletta. I teatri romani nelle Marche. Macerata, 1999.
- Fabrini, Giovanna Maria. Il nuovo volto di Urbs Salvia: dalle origini alla prima età imperiale. In G. de Marinis - G. Paci - E. Percossi - M. Silvestrini. Archeologia nel Maceratese. Nuove Acquisizioni. 2005.
- Ferranti, Giuseppe. Guida al territorio di Urbisaglia. Pro Manoscritto a cura di Urbsalviambiente. Urbisaglia, 1994.
- Luni Mario ( a cura di). Archeologia nelle Marche. Dalla preistoria all'Età tardoantica. Firenze, 2003.
- Salvucci Benedetto ( a cura di). Urbs Salvia. Periodico, I-III. Urbisaglia, 1970–1972.
- Salvucci Miria - Salvucci Giovanna (et al. ). Urbisaglia. Urbs Salvia, Capolavori in corso. Urbisaglia, 2003.
