= List of municipalities of the Province of Ascoli Piceno =

The following is a list of the 33 municipalities (comuni) of the Province of Ascoli Piceno in the region of Marche in Italy.

== List ==
Municipality	Population (2026)	Area (km²)	Density
Acquasanta Terme	2,411	138.39	17.4
Acquaviva Picena	3,586	21.06	170.3
Appignano del Tronto	1,641	23.19	70.8
Arquata del Tronto	910	92.23	9.9
Ascoli Piceno	45,193	158.02	286.0
Carassai	1,042	22.24	46.9
Castel di Lama	8,412	10.98	766.1
Castignano	2,511	38.80	64.7
Castorano	2,274	14.08	161.5
Colli del Tronto	3,681	5.94	619.7
Comunanza	2,919	54.40	53.7
Cossignano	879	14.95	58.8
Cupra Marittima	5,343	17.34	308.1
Folignano	8,649	14.86	582.0
Force	1,080	34.31	31.5
Grottammare	15,913	18.00	884.1
Maltignano	2,173	8.17	266.0
Massignano	1,609	16.30	98.7
Monsampolo del Tronto	4,379	15.43	283.8
Montalto delle Marche	1,814	33.94	53.4
Montedinove	443	11.93	37.1
Montefiore dell'Aso	1,946	28.21	69.0
Montegallo	364	48.46	7.5
Montemonaco	518	67.81	7.6
Monteprandone	13,111	26.38	497.0
Offida	4,569	49.60	92.1
Palmiano	150	12.70	11.8
Ripatransone	4,105	74.28	55.3
Roccafluvione	1,816	60.63	30.0
Rotella	764	27.44	27.8
San Benedetto del Tronto	46,976	25.41	1,848.7
Spinetoli	7,159	12.58	569.1
Venarotta	1,862	30.21	61.6

== See also ==
- List of municipalities of Marche
- List of municipalities of Italy
