= Monte Ascensione =

Mountain in Marche, Italy

- Monte Nero; Monte Polesio
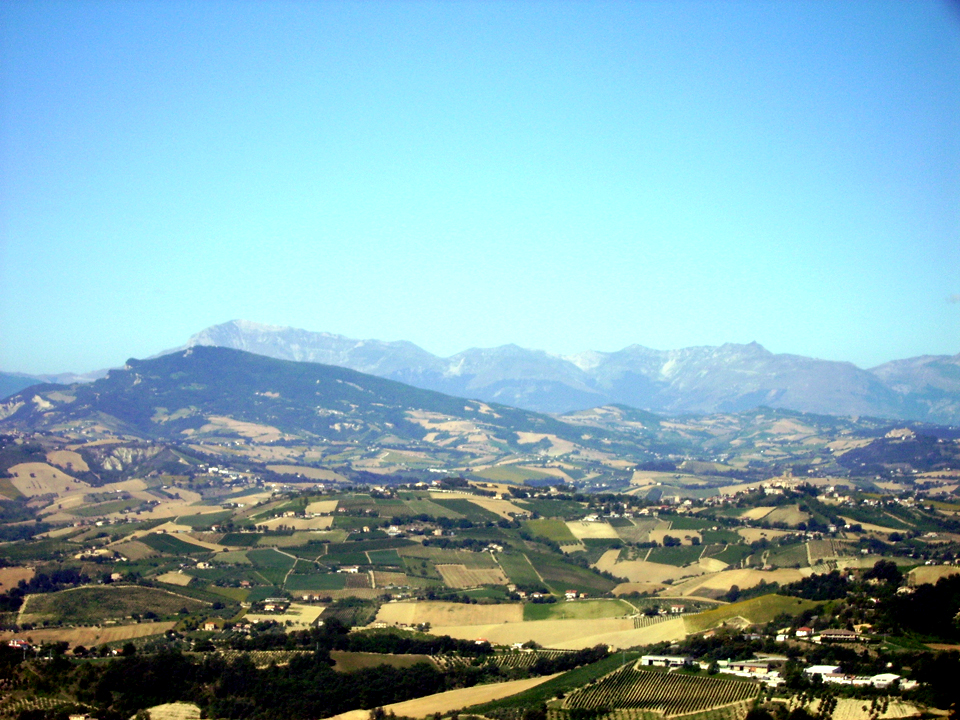
- The eastern slope of the mount with the Sibillini Mountains in the background seen from Ripatransone

Highest point
- Elevation: 1,110 m (3,640 ft)
- Coordinates: 42°55′23″N 13°33′18″E

Geography
- Location within Italy
- Location: Marche, Province of Ascoli Piceno, Italy
- Parent range: Apennine Mountains

Mount Ascensione (L'Ascenziò in Ascolano dialect) is a 1,110 m high elevation in the Marche sub-Apennines, located entirely in the province of Ascoli Piceno. It straddles the valleys of Tronto and Tesino, a river that originates just north near Force. The profile of Ascensione has a jagged appearance that suggests different figures: depending on the vantage point, it may resemble the Sleeping Beauty or the profile of Cecco d'Ascoli, a heretic and opponent of Dante Alighieri. The views from the east northeast and from the west southwest are perfectly symmetrical.

The area of this mountain is administratively divided among several municipal territories, such as: Ascoli to the south; Appignano del Tronto to the southeast; Castignano to the northeast; Rotella to the north; Force to the northwest; and Palmiano and Venarotta to the west.

== Description ==
Mount Ascensione is a relief that stands out among the hills north of Ascoli Piceno, being isolated from other mountains. From the summit of the mountain, a wide panorama can be seen, ranging from the Sibillini Mountains to the Gran Sasso and Maiella mountains, all the way to the Adriatic Sea.

=== Water courses ===
Several streams are originated from the mount:

- Chiaro: stream that flows southward until it flows into the Tronto near the Ascoli district of Santa Chiara (or Borgo Chiaro).
- Bretta: a stream that flows into the Tronto after passing Ripaberarda, Appignano del Tronto and the Ascoli hamlets of Poggio di Bretta and Brecciarolo.
- Chifente: a stream that originates on the eastern side of the mountain and flows into the Tronto in the municipality of Castel di Lama.
- Tesino: a river that originates in the northern slope and flows eastward until it flows into the Adriatic Sea.

=== Environment ===
The mountain is covered with dense vegetation, making it a special protection area. Its area is divided into two protected floristic areas:

Mount Ascension Floristic Area I - Extends within the territory belonging to the municipalities of Ascoli Piceno and Rotella covering an area of more than 11 hectares. It includes the summit area of the mountain and the cliff of Santa Polisia. The cliff named after the saint is located at the top of the relief, at an elevation of 1098 m, just below the summit and, with its rocks, it plunges sheer into the woods below with a drop of about 150 m. The vegetation covering this floristic area consists of typical mountain tree species, such as: coppice, manna ash, hornbeam, maple, rowan, holm oak, beech, and alternating pasture areas and rocky outcrops. A wide variety of flowers grows in the grassland areas, such as: sweet woodruff, spurge-laurel, annual mercury, common hepatica, orange lily, columbine and belladonna. Plant litter and snowdrop are found in the rift and fissure areas of the ground.

Mount Ascension Floristic Area II - The area is entirely under the jurisdiction of the Rotella municipal administration and covers 28 hectares along the northern, northwestern slope of the relief, known as the "Coast of St. Benedict." It is mainly a clayey, sandy soil in places with few rocky features. The forest consists mainly of coppiced chestnut trees, usable for obtaining timber and fruits. The undergrowth is enriched by the growth of shrubby and herbaceous plants such as tree heather, privet, lithosperm, laurel, spindle and cardamine. Liliaceous plants include: alpine squill, star-of-Bethlehem, butcher's broom, senecio, hogweed, and broad-leaved willowherb. The lady orchid with red-stained white flowers also grows there.

=== Feast of the Ascension ===
It is a tradition in the Ascoli area to make pilgrimages to the Mount, on the occasion of the Feast of the Ascension, a holiday (also present in many other parts of Italy) related to ancient water-related purification rites. Today the celebration persists, and consists of making a procession from the village of Polesio to the church of Our Lady of the Ascension, located at the top of the mount.

== Anthropic geography ==
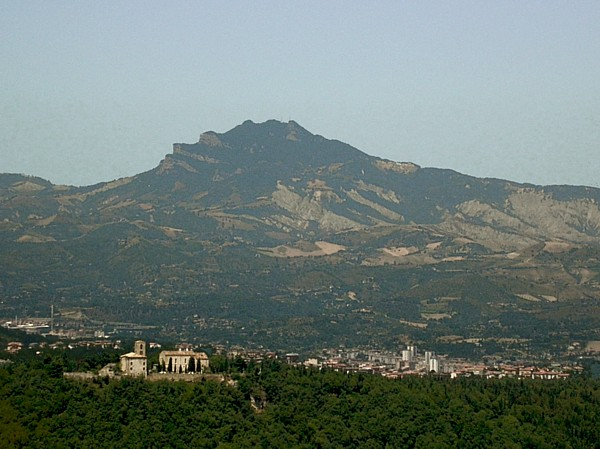
Southern profile of the mount: glimpse of the outskirts of Ascoli Piceno (Monticelli)

Abutting the mount are hamlets and towns (some of them once fortifications) belonging to the various municipalities that have administrative jurisdiction over the mount.

In the part under the administration of the municipality of Ascoli Piceno:

- Montadamo
- Polesio
- Porchiano dell'Ascensione
- Venagrande
- other minor hamlets (Casalena, Cignano, Colonnata, Morignano, Trivigliano-Villa Pagani, Venapiccola)

In the part under the administration of the municipality of Rotella:

- Capradosso
- Castel di Croce
- Poggio Canoso

In the part under the administration of the municipality of Venarotta:

- Cerreto
- Monsampietro

In the part under the administration of the municipality of Appignano del Tronto:

- Appignano del Tronto

In the part under the administration of the municipality of Castignano:

- Ripaberarda

In the part under the administration of the municipality of Force:

- Montemoro

In the part under the administration of the municipality of Palmiano:

- Castel San Pietro

All of the above municipalities fall within the area of the Badlands and Mount Ascensione Park, a geographic area circumscribed by Mount Ascensione, which is characterized by the imposing presence of the mountain and the formation of geomorphological phenomena of soil erosion called badlands. The aims of the Badlands and Mount Ascensione Park are to enhance the area and its environmental and cultural peculiarities.

It is an area that was strongly affected by the 2016 and 2017 earthquakes. In fact, all municipalities that are part of the Badlands and Mount Ascensione Park area are on the list of "Crater Municipalities".

== Oronyms ==
This mountain, over time, has been identified by three different designations.

=== Monte Nero ===
This name was the first oronym by which the relief was named. The term "black" was probably referable to the presence of a rich and dense forest vegetation, consisting of holm oaks and chestnut trees, which covered its northern slope, giving the walls a darker color than that of the surrounding hills and a "dark and mysterious appearance." Another interpretation suggests that it refers to the Greek word "nerèin," meaning water, to be linked to the presence of the springs found at the mountain's slopes.

=== Monte Polesio ===
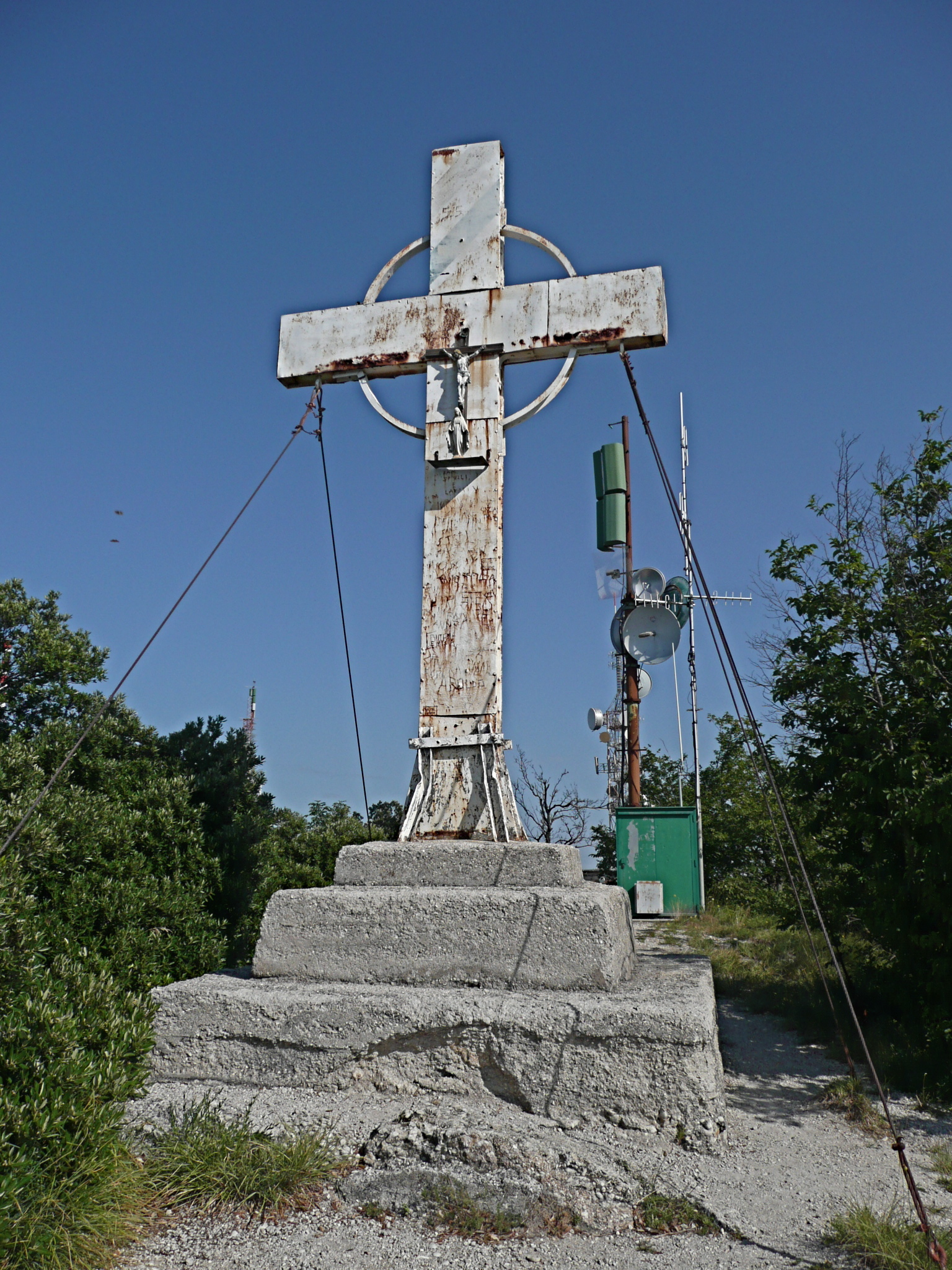
Cross on Mount Ascensione

Mount Polesio - (Mëndagna dë Pëliesce, in Ascolano dialect) - The name "Montis Polesii" or "Polexii" is mentioned in documents bearing dates of the 12th and 13th centuries. In order to find the origin of this oronym there are various interpretations that justify the attribution of the name Polesio to this mountain. It could derive from the archaic lemma "pol": a word defining a mountain, or from the term "polo" widely used in areas of central Italy to indicate a relief. A further interpretation leads back to the Latin word "paulus," which means small, but in past times identified the wooden stone that proselytes of naturalistic rites fixed on the top of mountains. Bartolomeo Palucci, a historian and religious scholar from Ascoli, identifies the origin of the name Polesio (Pëliesce) in the phonetic deformation of the Greek lemma "pelex" meaning jagged ridge, a description that would correspond to the morphology of the relief, which has about 10 peaks. Giuseppe Speranza ascribes the origin of the name Polesio to that of the Umbrian deity Esu, deriving the oronym from the words "Pol" and "Esu" that is: the "mountain of Esu," referring to the circumstance of the Umbrian people laying siege to the city of Ascoli and settling with their logistical bases at the heights of the mountain. A legend has it that the name is linked to that of Saint Polisia, a legendary figure placed in the 3rd-4th centuries of Ascoli history. The young woman is believed to have been the daughter of Polymius, prefect of Ascoli in the time of Diocletian, who was converted to Christianity and baptized by Bishop Emygdius. Her father, outraged at her conversion, had the Praetorians chase her down to capture her, but the girl, sheltering on the mountain, was miraculously swallowed by a chasm that suddenly opened. The author Quintus of Quintecimus believes that it was then that the Christians changed the name Monte Nero (Mons Nigris) to "Monte Polisio" in honor of the governor's daughter. This belief gave rise to the custom on the part of pilgrims to carry a stone, taken from among the pebbles and gravel of the Chiaro Creek, and leave it as a tribute to the saint on the crevice that allegedly hid her. In times past it was common to see piles of stones along the crevice. It is said that Polisia never died, but is alive to this day inside the mount, in the company of a hen with gold chicks, weaving on a loom, also made of gold. Also according to legend, it is reported that the noise one hears as one leans over the cliffs or rests one's ear on the rocks at the summit of the mountain corresponds to that of the shuttle of chicks chirping and the loom of Saint Polisia, working the fabric for her "wedding dress with the Divine Bridegroom." A further hypothesis, probably the one closest to reality, links the mountain's name to the figure of Cintio Polesio, a man from Ascoli, who raised a castle at the base of the mountain's cliff in the 9th century. It is plausible to assume that the elevation was called "Mount of the Castle of Polesio."

=== Monte Ascensione ===
The mountain took this name from the oratory, dedicated to the Ascension of Jesus into heaven and the Assumption of Mary into heaven, that the lay preacher Meco del Sacco built on top of the relief in the medieval period. Some Ascoli authors tell us that more than one consecrated place intended for prayer was raised on this mountain; Gabriele Nepi counted six, Giuseppe Fabiani had identified two.

== See also ==
- Apennine Mountains
- Province of Ascoli Piceno
- Tesino
- Rotella, Marche

== Bibliography ==
- Narciso Galiè Gabriele Vecchioni, Il Monte dell'Ascensione, Società Editrice Ricerche s.a.s, Via Faenza, 13, Folignano (Ascoli Piceno), Stampa Grafiche D'Auria, maggio 1999, pp. 14, 15, 28-31, 82, 83, 84, 92, ISBN 88-86610-10-6
- Giuseppe Marinelli, Dizionario Toponomastico Ascolano - La Storia, i Costumi, i Personaggi nelle Vie della Città, D'Auria Editrice, Ascoli Piceno, marzo 2009, pp. 207, 250;
- List of 140 municipalities included in the "Earthquake Crater"
