= Monsampietro =

- Frazione
- Location of Monsampietro in Italy
- Coordinates: 42°54′36.25″N 13°30′34.25″E
- Country: Italy
- Region: Marche
- Province: Province of Ascoli Piceno (AP)
- Comune: Venarotta
- Elevation: 520 m (1,710 ft)

Population
  - Total: 30
- Time zone: UTC+1 (CET)
  - Summer (DST): UTC+2 (CEST)
- Postal code: 63091
- Dialing code: 0736
- Patron saint: Saint Athanasius
- Saint day: 1st sunday of may

Monsampietro is a frazione (hamlet) of the comune (municipality) of Venarotta in the province of Ascoli Piceno in the Italian region Marche. The territory is part of Diocese of Ascoli Piceno.

== Geography ==
The settlement of Monsampietro stands in the hilly territory north-west of the Apennines area of Ascoli Piceno, and is located on the hilly ridge between the creek Chiaro and Fosso dell'Erba. At 6 km north of Venarotta and 16 km north of Ascoli Piceno, bordered to the north with Montemoro (frazione of Force) and Castel di Croce (frazione of Rotella), to the east with Casalena (frazione of Venagrande) south and west with Cerreto and Portella; The last two places are also frazione of Venarotta. The border to the south and west, natural, consists of the creek Chiaro (downstream tributary of the river Tronto), to the east, which is also natural, consists of the Fosso dell'Erba, tributary of Chiaro. The landscape includes more east the characteristic sawtooth of Monte Ascensione accompanied by underlying badlands, south the Montagna dei Fiori (followed by the Gran Sasso e Monti della Laga National Park) and to the west Monte Vettore (m . 2476, within the Monti Sibillini National Park).

== History ==
There is not definite information about its beginnings, but it seems that the parish of San Pietro Apostolo in Monsampietro was founded by monks of Farfa Abbey (religious who, at the time, were present in the valleys of the Tronto and Tenna); This would place its beginnings before the year one thousand.

A note on Monsampietro, deemed reliable, can be found in the "Compendio di storia ascolana" (Luzi Emidio - Arnaldo Forni Editore, 1980) which states that Monsampietro, in 1296, came under the rule of Ascoli Piceno with a population of 800 souls, concentrated in the villas of Tribio, Cardoni and Ferrani.
