= Dino Ferrari =

Italian painter (1914–2000)

Dino Ferrari (29 May 1914 – 15 September 2000) was an Italian painter. He was born and died in Ascoli Piceno.

== Works ==
=== Directory of museums that contain his works ===
- Assalto alla Città, oil on panel, Gallery of Modern Art of the Palazzo Pitti, Florence, 1958
- Veduta del Salone della Vittoria, oil on panel, Pinacoteca Civica in Ascoli Piceno, 1935
- Veduta di paese, oil on canvas, Pinacoteca Civica in Ascoli Piceno, 1955
- Veduta architettonica con figure, oil on panel, Pinacoteca Civica in Ascoli Piceno, 1962
- Figura di donna, oil on canvas, Pinacoteca Civica in Ascoli Piceno, 1962

=== Public works ===
- I tre Regni, fresco, central apse of the church of Sacro Cuore in Ascoli Piceno, 1955
- Nozze di Cana, fresco, church of Santa Maria of Petritoli, 1958
- Le tre chiese, la Militante, la Purgante, la Trionfante, fresco, church of Santa Maria in Petritoli, 1958
- Sant'Antonio da Padova, oil on canvas, church of Sant'Antonio in Castel di Lama, 1972
- Crocifissione, acrylic on panel (240X350), church of Sant'Antonio in Castel di Lama, 1981
- Cristo risorto, acrylic on panel (220x180), church of Sant'Antonio in Castel di Lama, 1981
- Cristo tra i malati, acrylic on panel (190x300), Auditorium CARISAP in Ascoli Piceno, 2000
- Crocifissione con predella raffigurante la Via Crucis, acrylic on panel (245x300), Auditorium CARISAP in Ascoli Piceno, 2000

=== Works in private collections ===
- Vanità di donne, 1984, acrylic on canvas (Milan, private collection). The painting represents one of the outcomes of the search for the ultimate Ferrari
- A teatro, 1973, oil on masonite 40x30 (Ascoli Piceno private collection)

== Prizes ==
- 50 Poeti per 50 Pittori, premio speciale, Rome, 1975
- Force, Assessorato al turismo della Regione Marche, Force, 1976
- Quercia d'Oro 82, premio nazionale della cultura, Rome, 1982
- S. Benedetto 82, San Benedetto del Tronto, 1982
- Oscar Italia 1982, Viareggio
- Quercia d'Oro 83, premio nazionale, Rome, 1983
- Biennale Internazionale della Critica 1983, Latina
- Europa 83, Galleria d'Arte Moderna Alba, Ferrara, 1983
- Gran Sigillo d'Europa London 1983, London
- Europeo della cultura, Republic of San Marino, 1983
- Nazioni Aquila d'Oro
- Galleria d'Arte Moderna Alba, Ferrara, 1984
- Bologna 1984, Bologna
- David 1984, Galleria d'Arte Moderna Alba, Ferrara
- Alba 1985, Galleria d'Arte Moderna Alba, Ferrara
- Città di New York, premio internazionale, Galleria d'Arte Moderna Alba, Ferrara, 1987
- Trofeo d'Oro 1987, Galleria d'Arte Moderna Alba, Ferrara
- VIP 1988, Galleria d'Arte Moderna Alba, Ferrara

== Exhibitions ==
- Collettiva, Palazzo degli Studi di Recanati, 1935, Recanati
- Collettiva di arte sacra, Presidenza Diocesana, 1953, Livorno
- Collettiva “VI Premio Nazionale di Pittura Golfo della Spezia”, (with Mario Sironi, Carla Accardi, Gerardo Dottori, Felice Casorati, Ottone Rosai, Mino Maccari, Emilio Vedova), 1954, La Spezia
- Collettiva “Rassegna d'arte italiana”, Graphil Galerie, 1963, Amsterdam
- Personale di grafiche e collages, Galleria d'Arte Nuove Proposte, 1974, Ascoli Piceno
- Personale di opere grafiche, Galleria Open Art, 1987, San Benedetto del Tronto
