= Montegallo =

- Comune
- Comune di Montegallo
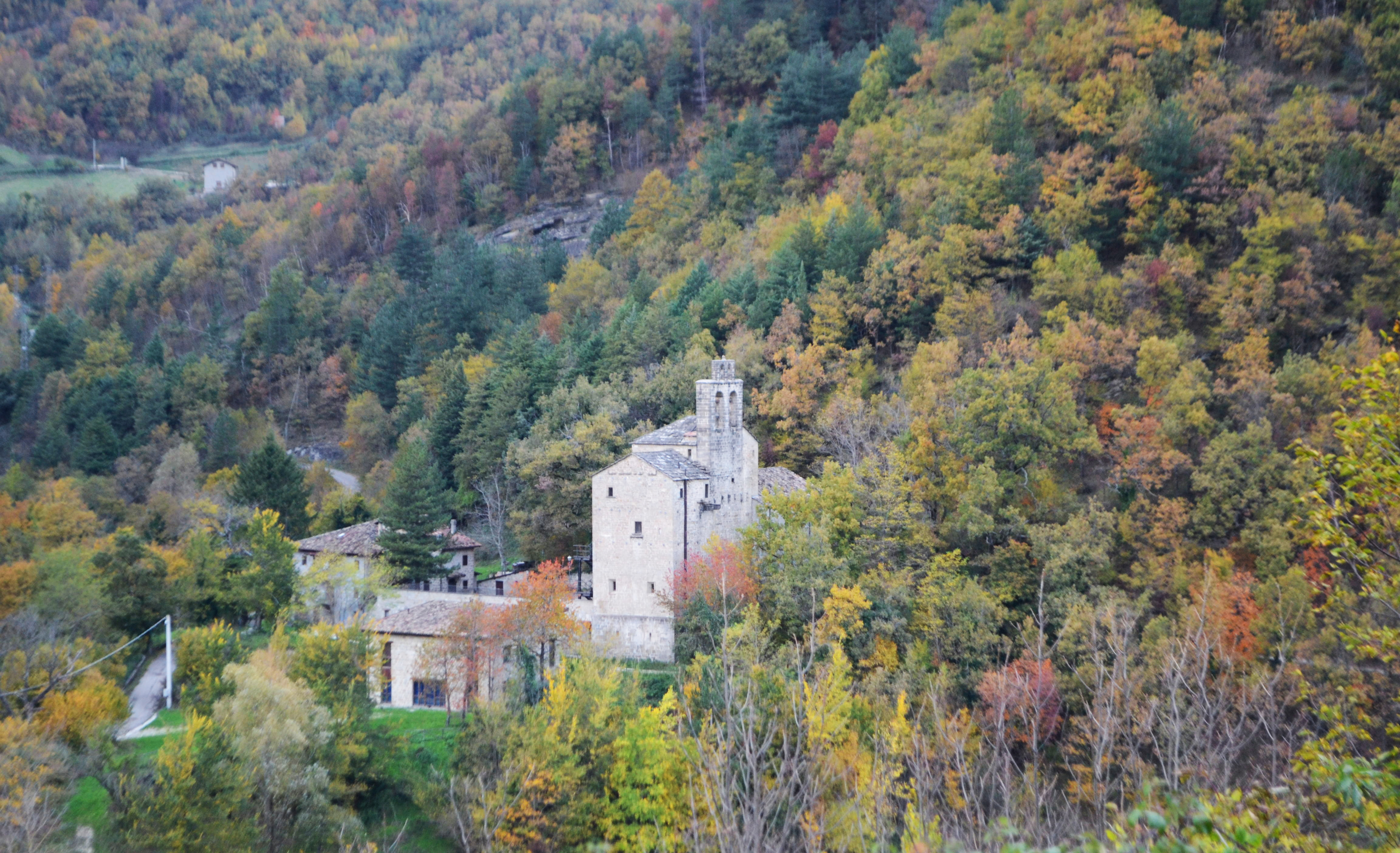

- Location within Italy Location within Marche
- Coordinates: 42°50′N 13°20′E
- Country: Italy
- Region: Marche
- Province: Ascoli Piceno (AP)
- Frazioni: Abetito, Astorara, Balzo, Balzetto, Bisignano, Castro, Colle, Collefratte, Colleluce, Collicello, Corbara, Fonditore, Forca, Interprete, Migliarelli, Piano, Propezzano, Rigo, Uscerno, Vallorsara

Government
  - Mayor: Sergio Fabiani

Area
  - Total: 48.46 km^{2} (18.71 sq mi)

Population (30 November 2017)
  - Total: 507
  - Density: 10.5/km^{2} (27.1/sq mi)
- Demonym: Montegallesi
- Time zone: UTC+1 (CET)
  - Summer (DST): UTC+2 (CEST)
- Postal code: 63040
- Dialing code: 0736
- Website: Official website

Montegallo is a comune (municipality) in the Province of Ascoli Piceno in the Italian region Marche, located about 90 kilometres (56 mi) south of Ancona and about 20 kilometres (12 mi) west of Ascoli Piceno.

Montegallo borders the following municipalities: Acquasanta Terme, Arquata del Tronto, Comunanza, Montemonaco, Roccafluvione.
