= Santi Pietro e Paolo, Castignano =

Coordinates: 42.9378°N 13.6219°E

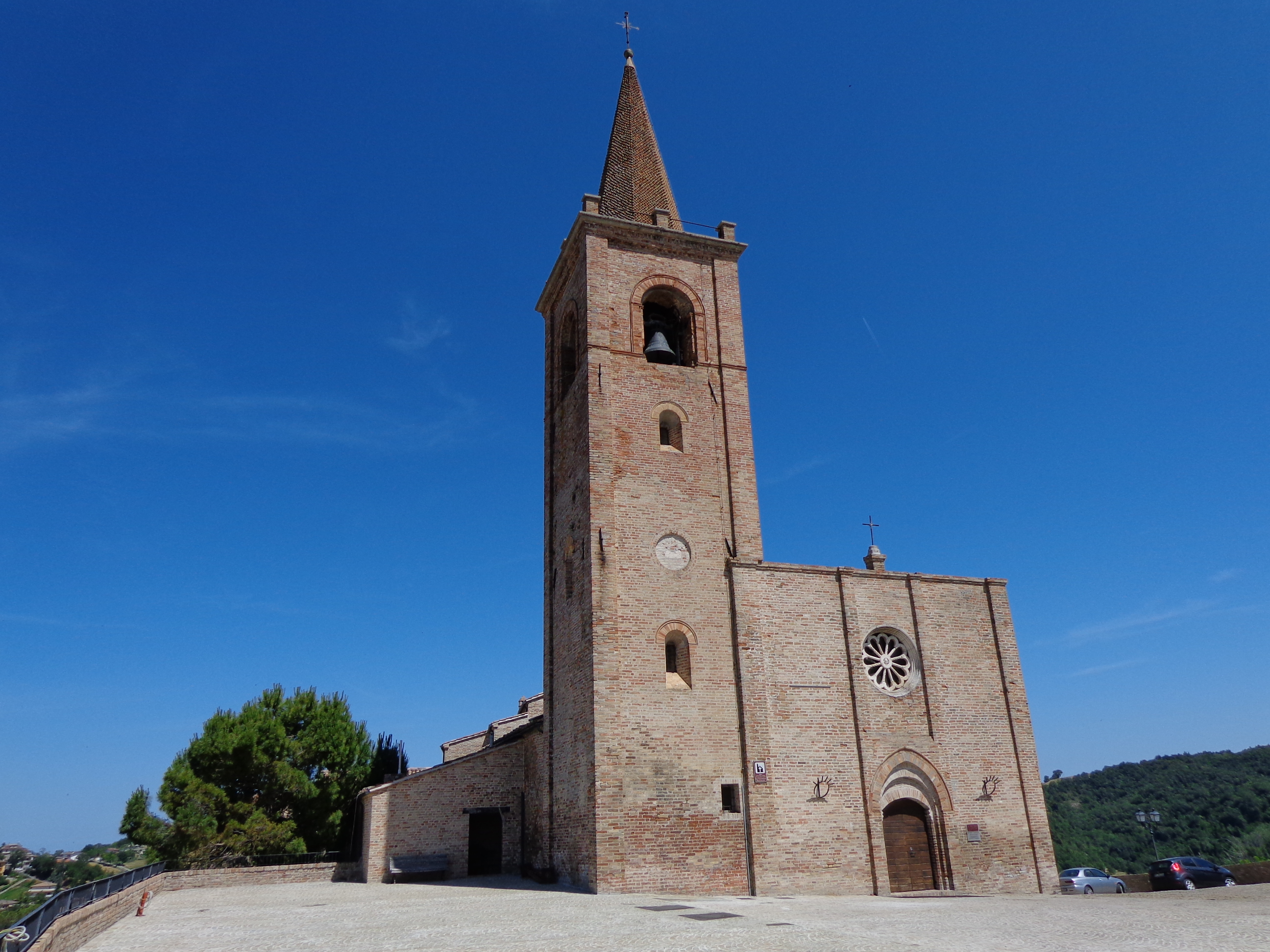
Facade and bell-tower

Santi Pietro e Paolo is a Romanesque and Gothic Roman Catholic church located at Piazza San Pietro in the center of the town of Castignano, in the province of Ascoli Piceno, region of Marche, Italy.

== History and description ==
A church at the site is documented since the 11th century, but the present building was completed in the 14th-century. The rectangular brick facade with tall simple pilasters has a rose-window with 12 travertine marble columns as rays. The peaked central facade has terracotta sculptures depicting the Redeemer.

The flanking bell tower, visible from afar, is a masterpiece of Romanesque architecture of the early fourteenth century. The church houses a 15th-century fresco depicting the Madonna and Child with St Lucia. The church has two aisles, with trussed roof, and flanked by baroque wooden altars and a wooden choir of six stalls, attributed to the 15th-century artist Apollonius of Ripatransone.

The main altarpiece depicts Saints Peter and Paul with Castignano in background (18th century). The right wall has a 15th-century fresco depicting the Last Judgment, in which an angel reads the books recording the lives of the judged and weighs souls in a balance before St Michael. At the right of Christ, the blessed are served by the angels, while on the left, the damned are tortured by devils.

The sacristy has a museum displaying valuable works, such as a gilt-silver and bejeweled Reliquary of the Holy Cross, commissioned in 1488 from Pietro Vannini by the Conventual Friars. The relics, putatively fragments of wood of the column on which Christ was scourged, were donated by Pope Nicholas IV in 1288.
