= Monte Vidon =

Monte Vidon may refer to two Italian municipalities in the Marche:

- Monte Vidon Combatte, in the Province of Fermo
- Monte Vidon Corrado, in the Province of Fermo
