= Roccafluvione =

- Comune
- Comune di Roccafluvione
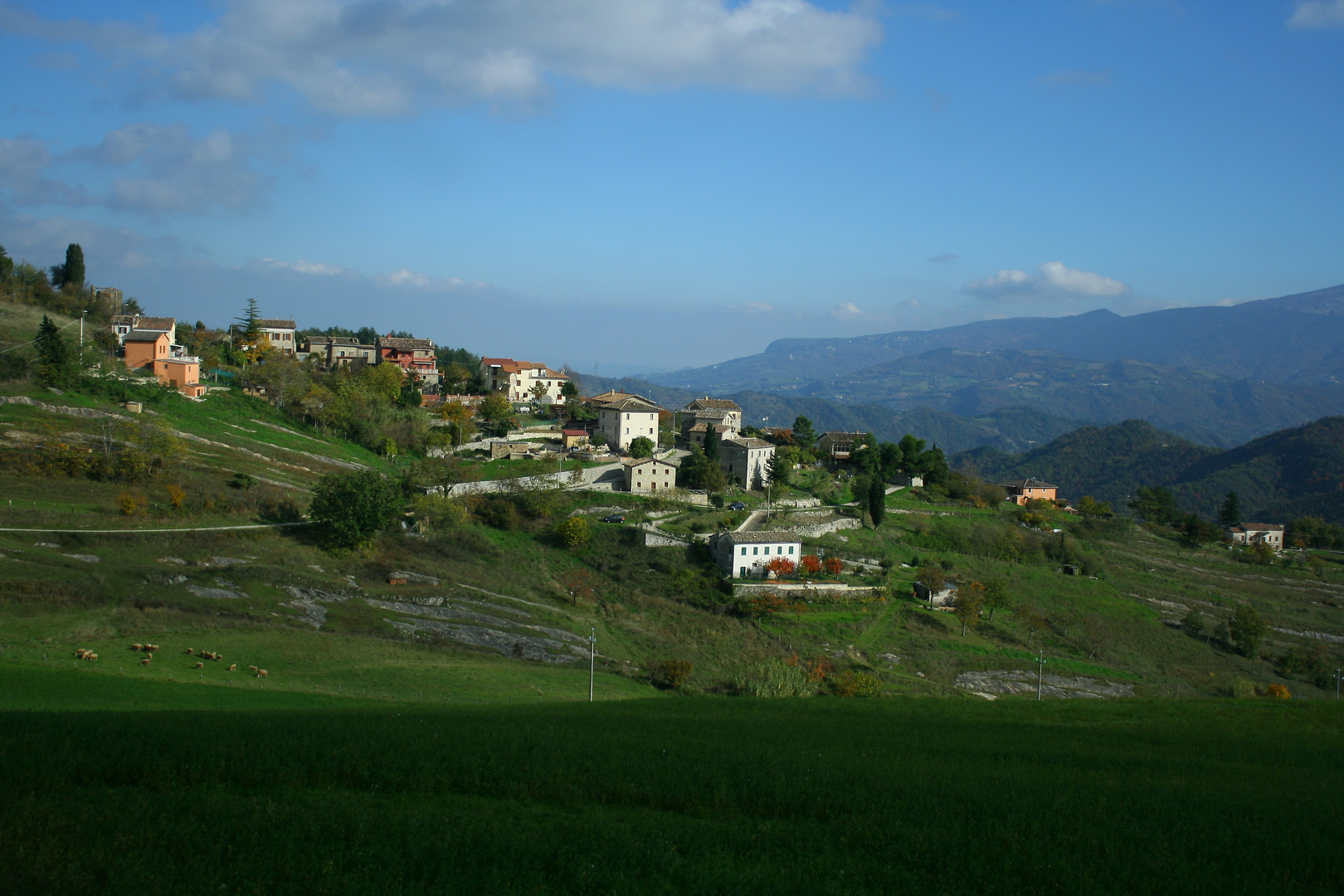

- Location within Italy Location within Marche
- Coordinates: 42°52′N 13°29′E
- Country: Italy
- Region: Marche
- Province: Ascoli Piceno (AP)

Government
  - Mayor: Francesco Leoni

Area
  - Total: 60.63 km^{2} (23.41 sq mi)
- Elevation: 299 m (981 ft)

Population (1 January 2016)
  - Total: 2,010
  - Density: 33.2/km^{2} (85.9/sq mi)
- Demonym: Roccafluvionesi
- Time zone: UTC+1 (CET)
  - Summer (DST): UTC+2 (CEST)
- Postal code: 63093
- Dialing code: 0736
- Website: Official website

Roccafluvione is a comune (municipality) in the Province of Ascoli Piceno in the Italian region Marche, located about 80 kilometres (50 mi) south of Ancona and about 8 kilometres (5 mi) west of Ascoli Piceno.

Roccafluvione borders the following municipalities: Acquasanta Terme, Ascoli Piceno, Comunanza, Montegallo, Palmiano, Venarotta.
