= Cossignano =

- Comune
- Comune di Cossignano
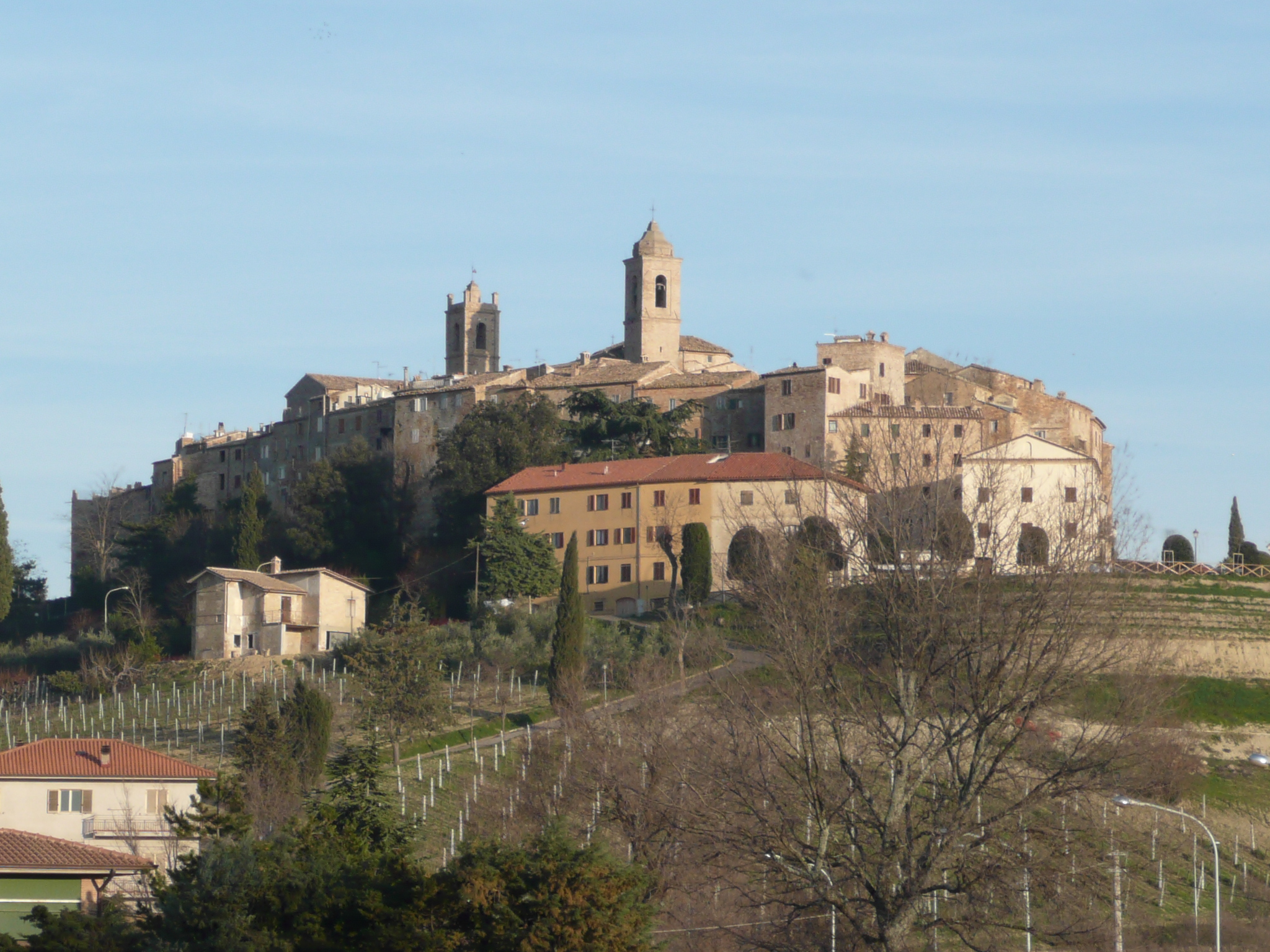

- Location within Italy Location within Marche
- Coordinates: 42°59′N 13°41′E
- Country: Italy
- Region: Marche
- Province: Province of Ascoli Piceno (AP)
- Frazioni: Ponte

Area
  - Total: 15.1 km^{2} (5.8 sq mi)
- Elevation: 400 m (1,300 ft)

Population (Dec. 2004)
  - Total: 1,029
  - Density: 68.1/km^{2} (176/sq mi)
- Demonym: Cossignanesi
- Time zone: UTC+1 (CET)
  - Summer (DST): UTC+2 (CEST)
- Postal code: 63030
- Dialing code: 0735
- Website: Official website

Cossignano is a comune (municipality) in the Province of Ascoli Piceno in the Italian region Marche, located about 70 kilometres (43 mi) south of Ancona and about 15 kilometres (9 mi) northeast of Ascoli Piceno. As of 31 December 2004, it had a population of 1,029 and an area of 15.1 square kilometres (5.8 mi^{2}).

The municipality of Cossignano contains the frazione (subdivision) Ponte.

Cossignano borders the following municipalities: Carassai, Castignano, Montalto delle Marche, Offida, and Ripatransone.

== Demographic evolution ==
Historical population

| Year | Pop. | ±% |
|---|---|---|
| 1861 | 1,319 | — |
| 1871 | 1,439 | +9.1% |
| 1881 | 1,534 | +6.6% |
| 1901 | 1,798 | +17.2% |
| 1911 | 2,053 | +14.2% |

| Year | Pop. | ±% |
|---|---|---|
| 1921 | 2,090 | +1.8% |
| 1931 | 2,005 | −4.1% |
| 1936 | 2,070 | +3.2% |
| 1951 | 2,127 | +2.8% |
| 1961 | 1,743 | −18.1% |

| Year | Pop. | ±% |
|---|---|---|
| 1971 | 1,262 | −27.6% |
| 1981 | 1,113 | −11.8% |
| 1991 | 1,043 | −6.3% |
| 2001 | 1,036 | −0.7% |

Source: Data from ISTAT
