= Tesino =

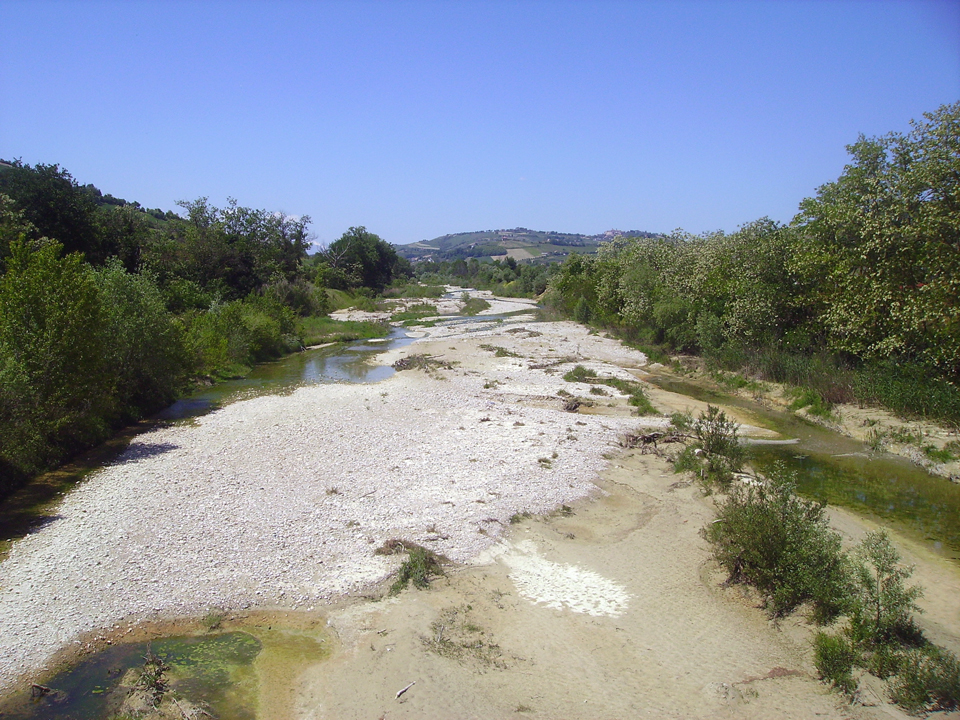

Location
- Country: Italy

Physical characteristics
- Source
  - location: Monte La Torre near Force
  - elevation: 826 m (2,710 ft)
- Mouth: Adriatic Sea
  - location: Grottammare
  - coordinates: 42°58′42″N 13°52′32″E
- Length: 37 km (23 mi)

The Tesino (Latin: Tessuinum) is a 37-kilometre (23 mi) Italian river which flows through the region of Marche. It is born on the slopes of Monte La Torre, near Force in the Province of Ascoli Piceno, and enters the Adriatic near Grottammare

== See also ==
- Monte Ascensione
