= Maltignano =

- Comune
- Comune di Maltignano
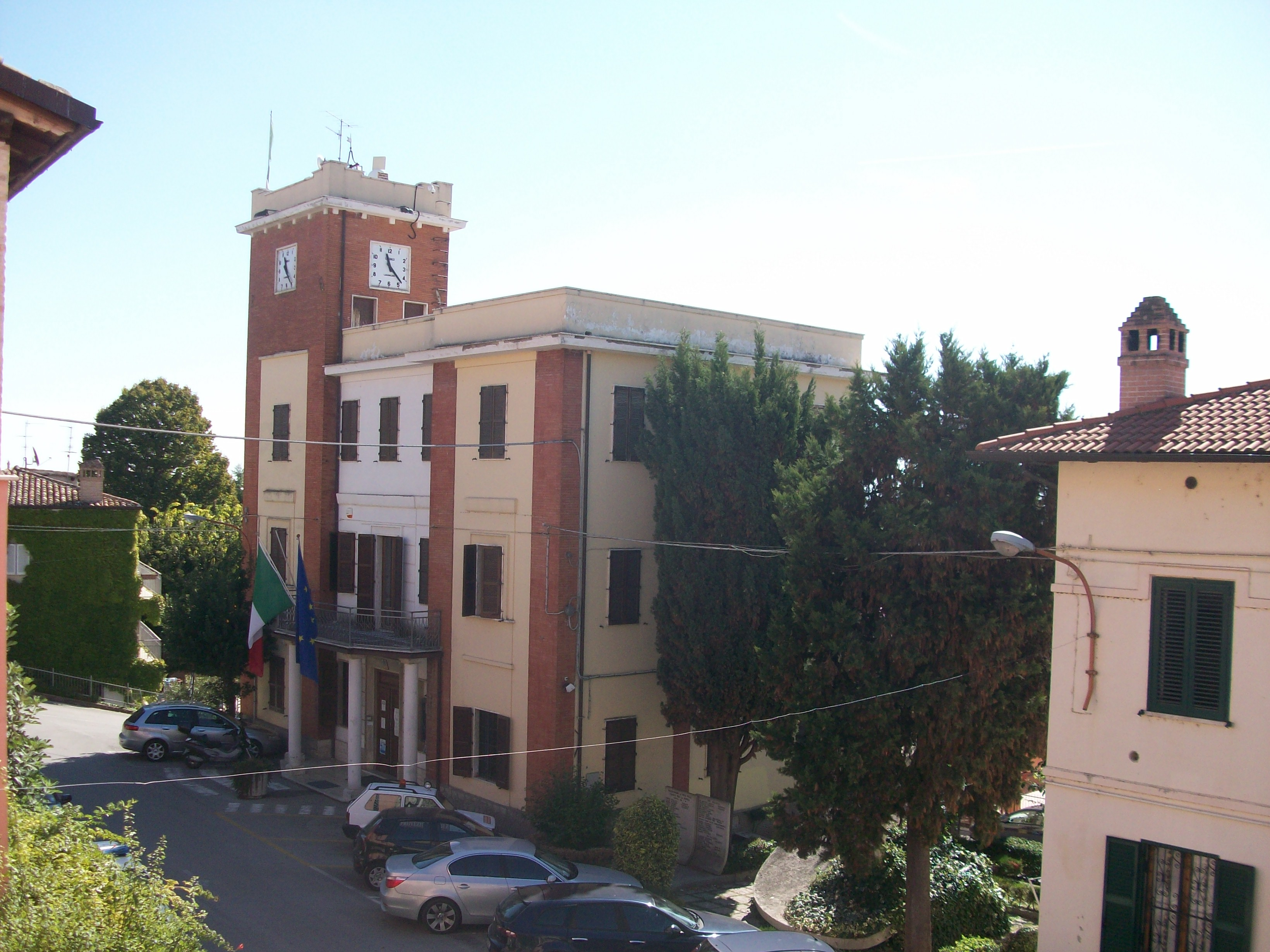

- Location within Italy Location within Marche
- Coordinates: 42°50′N 13°41′E
- Country: Italy
- Region: Marche
- Province: Province of Ascoli Piceno

Area
  - Total: 8.2 km^{2} (3.2 sq mi)

Population (Dec. 2004)
  - Total: 2,470
  - Density: 300/km^{2} (780/sq mi)
- Demonym: Maltignanesi
- Time zone: UTC+1 (CET)
  - Summer (DST): UTC+2 (CEST)
- Postal code: 63040
- Dialing code: 0736

Maltignano is a comune (municipality) in the Province of Ascoli Piceno in the Italian region Marche, located about 90 kilometres (56 mi) south of Ancona and about 8 kilometres (5 mi) east of Ascoli Piceno. As of 31 December 2004, it had a population of 2,470 and an area of 8.2 square kilometres (3.2 mi^{2}).

Maltignano borders the following municipalities: Ascoli Piceno, Folignano, Sant'Egidio alla Vibrata

== Demographic evolution ==
Historical population

| Year | Pop. | ±% |
|---|---|---|
| 1861 | 896 | — |
| 1871 | 1,039 | +16.0% |
| 1881 | 1,080 | +3.9% |
| 1901 | 1,158 | +7.2% |
| 1911 | 1,305 | +12.7% |

| Year | Pop. | ±% |
|---|---|---|
| 1921 | 1,394 | +6.8% |
| 1931 | 1,446 | +3.7% |
| 1936 | 1,503 | +3.9% |
| 1951 | 1,585 | +5.5% |
| 1961 | 1,431 | −9.7% |

| Year | Pop. | ±% |
|---|---|---|
| 1971 | 1,303 | −8.9% |
| 1981 | 1,775 | +36.2% |
| 1991 | 2,295 | +29.3% |
| 2001 | 2,357 | +2.7% |

Source: Data from ISTAT
