= Appignano del Tronto =

- Comune
- Comune di Appignano del Tronto
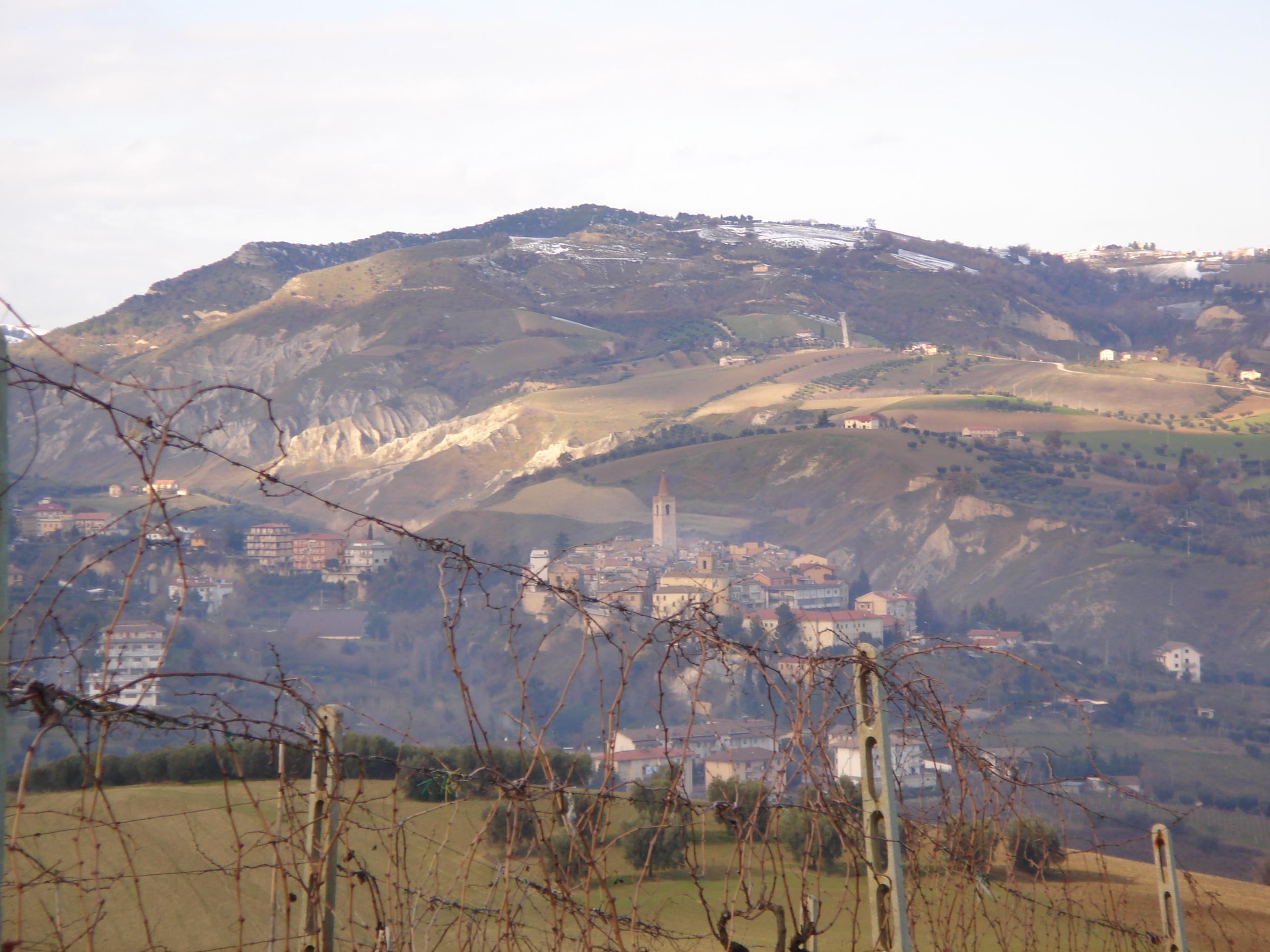
- Landscape

- Location of Appignano del Tronto in Italy Appignano del Tronto (Marche)
- Coordinates: 42°54′N 13°40′E
- Country: Italy
- Region: Marche
- Province: Ascoli Piceno (AP)

Government
  - Mayor: Sara Moreschini

Area
  - Total: 23.19 km^{2} (8.95 sq mi)
- Elevation: 194 m (636 ft)

Population (30 April 2017)
  - Total: 1,788
  - Density: 77.10/km^{2} (199.7/sq mi)
- Demonym: Appignanesi
- Time zone: UTC+1 (CET)
  - Summer (DST): UTC+2 (CEST)
- Postal code: 63042
- Dialing code: 0736
- Website: Official website

Appignano del Tronto is a comune (municipality) in the Province of Ascoli Piceno in the Italian region Marche, located about 80 kilometres (50 mi) south of Ancona and about 9 kilometres (6 mi) northeast of Ascoli Piceno.

Appignano del Tronto borders the following municipalities: Ascoli Piceno, Castel di Lama, Castignano, Offida.
