= Palmiano =

- Comune
- Comune di Palmiano
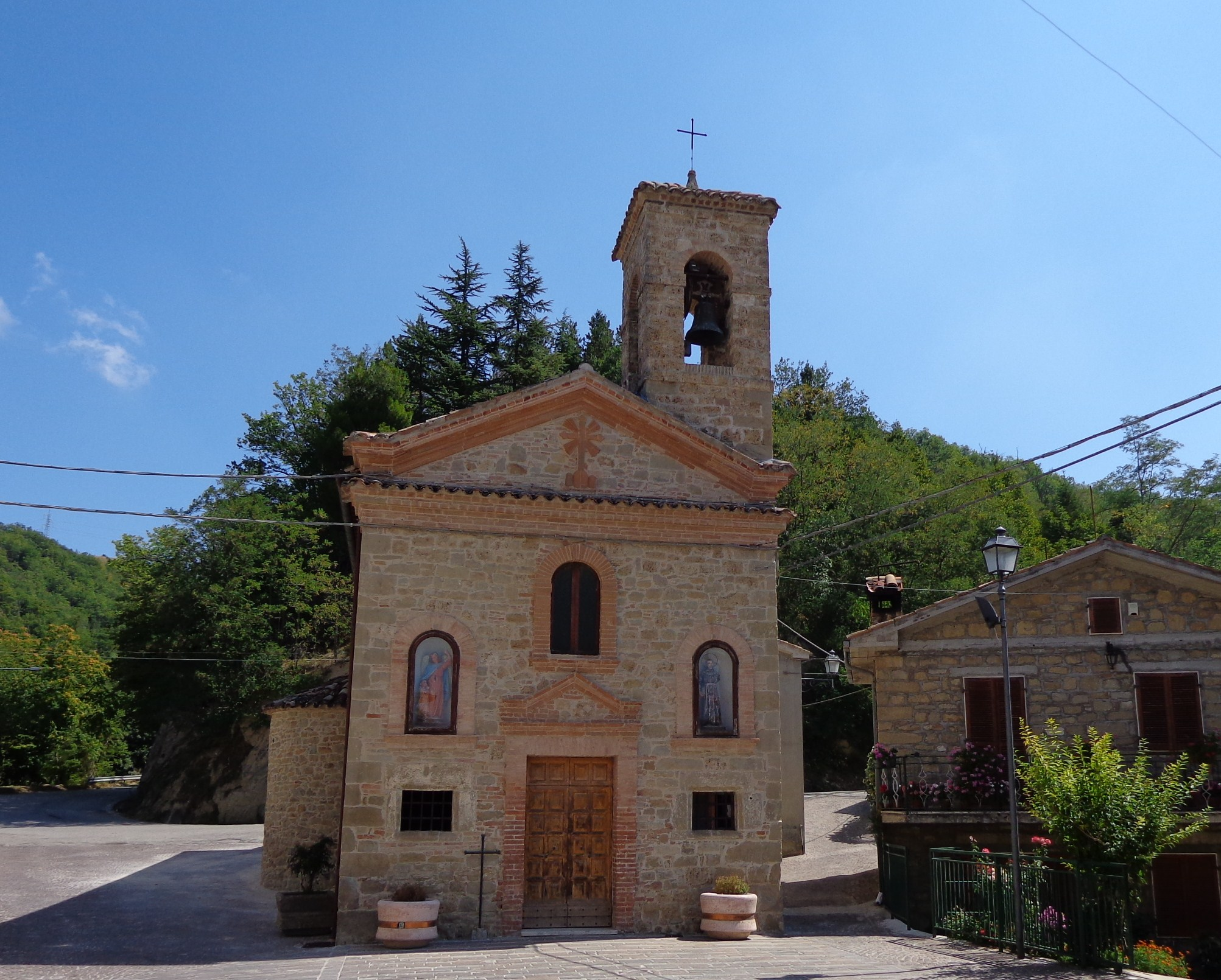
- The church of St Michael the Archangel

- Coat of arms

- Location within Italy Location within Marche
- Coordinates: 42°54′N 13°28′E
- Country: Italy
- Region: Marche
- Province: Ascoli Piceno (AP)
- Frazioni: Castel San Pietro

Government
  - Mayor: Giuseppe Amici

Area
  - Total: 12.5 km^{2} (4.8 sq mi)
- Elevation: 550 m (1,800 ft)

Population (28 February 2010)
  - Total: 208
  - Density: 16.6/km^{2} (43.1/sq mi)
- Demonym: Palmianesi
- Time zone: UTC+1 (CET)
  - Summer (DST): UTC+2 (CEST)
- Postal code: 63040
- Dialing code: 0736

Palmiano is a comune (municipality) in the Province of Ascoli Piceno in the Italian region Marche, located about 80 kilometres (50 mi) south of Ancona and about 11 kilometres (7 mi) northwest of Ascoli Piceno.

Palmiano borders the following municipalities: Comunanza, Force, Roccafluvione, Venarotta.
