= Venarotta =

- Comune
- Comune di Venarotta
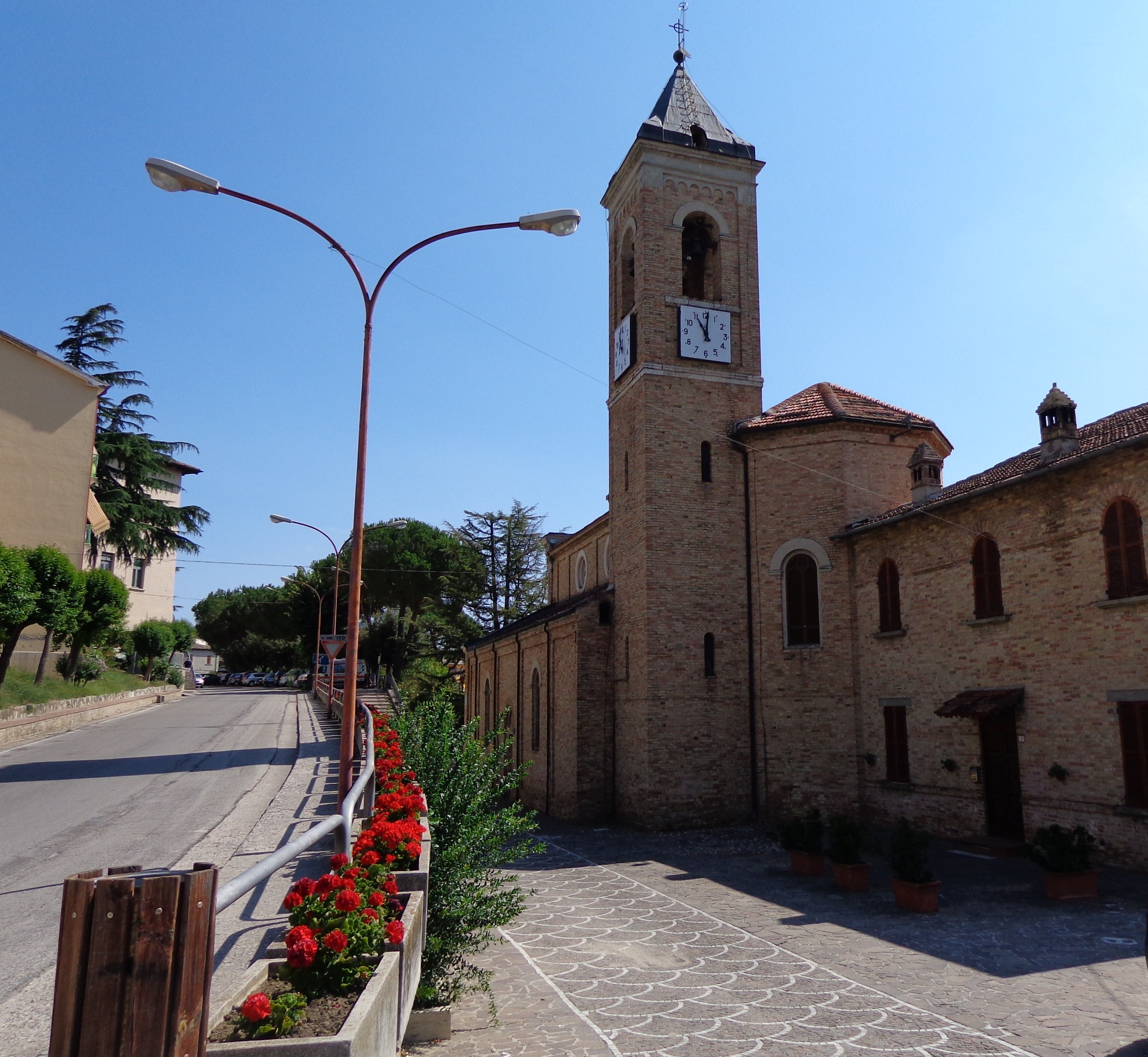
- Church of Santi Cosa e Damiano.

- Location within Italy Location within Marche
- Coordinates: 42°53′N 13°30′E
- Country: Italy
- Region: Marche
- Province: Ascoli Piceno (AP)
- Frazioni: Capodipiano, Castellano, Cepparano, Cerreto, Gimigliano, Monsampietro, Olibra, Portella, Vallorano

Government
  - Mayor: Fabio Salvi

Area
  - Total: 30.21 km^{2} (11.66 sq mi)
- Elevation: 421 m (1,381 ft)

Population (1 January 2016)
  - Total: 2,066
  - Density: 68.39/km^{2} (177.1/sq mi)
- Demonym: Venarottesi
- Time zone: UTC+1 (CET)
  - Summer (DST): UTC+2 (CEST)
- Postal code: 63091
- Dialing code: 0736
- Website: Official website

Venarotta is a comune (municipality) in the province of Ascoli Piceno in the Italian region of Marche. It is located about 80 kilometres (50 mi) south of Ancona and about 8 kilometres (5 mi) northwest of Ascoli Piceno.

Venarotta borders the following municipalities: Ascoli Piceno, Force, Palmiano, Roccafluvione, Rotella.

== Twin towns ==
- Lantriac, France
