= Montalto delle Marche =

- Comune
- Comune di Montalto delle Marche
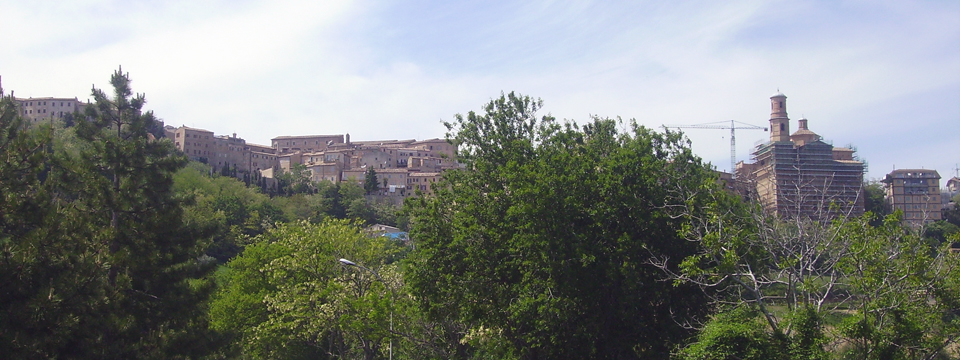

- Location within Italy Location within Marche
- Coordinates: 42°59′14″N 13°36′25″E
- Country: Italy
- Region: Marche
- Province: Ascoli Piceno (AP)
- Frazioni: Madonna del Lago, Patrignone, Porchia

Government
  - Mayor: Daniel Matricardi

Area
  - Total: 34.1 km^{2} (13.2 sq mi)
- Elevation: 512 m (1,680 ft)

Population (30 November 2019)
  - Total: 1,991
  - Density: 58.4/km^{2} (151/sq mi)
- Demonym: Montaltesi
- Time zone: UTC+1 (CET)
  - Summer (DST): UTC+2 (CEST)
- Postal code: 63068
- Dialing code: 0736
- Website: Official website

Montalto delle Marche is a comune (municipality) and former Latin catholic bishopric in the Province of Ascoli Piceno in the Italian region of Marche, located in the hilly area that goes from the Adriatic cost to the Sibillini Mountains, at a distance of about 70 kilometres (43 mi) south of Ancona and about 15 kilometres (9 mi) north of Ascoli Piceno, with a population of 1 991 inhabitants. The municipal territory covers a 34 km^{2} (13 sq mi) area.

The municipality of Montalto is organised in a central town (Montalto) and three hamlets: Porchia, Patrignone, and an urban agglomeration in "c.da Lago" (located in Valdaso, along the Aso river).

Montalto delle Marche is still structured around the medieval village. Along the walls, there are three main gates who provide the access to the central fortification, which is divided into three main areas: the Cassero, the Peracchia and Piazza Umberto I. The modern part of the city is located on the northeast side, and includes the main square (Piazza Sisto V) and the monumental Cathedral, constructed by the desire of Pope Sixtus V.

The hamlets of Porchia and Patrignone are also medieval villages, once autonomous municipalities: the medieval fortifications are still existing. Montalto delle Marche borders the following municipalities: Carassai, Castignano, Cossignano, Monte Rinaldo, Montedinove, Montelparo, Ortezzano.

The episcopal museum now houses the elaborate Montalto Reliquary in gold, silver, enamel and gemstones, with a central French Late Gothic section of the 1370s, added to by Italian Renaissance goldsmiths around 1460. It was given by Pope Sixtus V in 1586 to the cathedral of his home town.

== History ==
The territory of Montalto was already inhabited in prehistoric times: in the Archaeological Museum there are several findings and exhibits form the Neolithic (6000 BC), from the Apennine people (2500 BC) and from the Picenum and Roman periods. In the fourteenth century, the local communities organized themselves in the free municipalities of Montalto, Patrignone and Porchia.

In 1418 Montalto started to independently elect the Podestà, and in the 15th century was part of the land of Presidato Farfense, as part of the Papal States.

Since 1586, on the will of Pope Sixtus V, the city began the capital of "Presidato di Montalto" (State of Montalto), which included 13 municipalities under its control. Furthermore, a State Mint is founded.

In 1798, during the French "Italian Campaign", Montalto rose up against the Napoleonic army: the Bishop of Montalto, Mons. Castiglioni (future Pope Pius VIII), was arrested and deported to Mantua.

With the restoration of 1816, Montalto became the a capital district, including the municipalities of Amandola, Offida, Ripatransone and San Benedetto del Tronto. The heritage of the State of Montalto was definitely suppressed in 1861, with the end of the Papal States and the Italian unification.

Among the "illustrious citizens" of Montalto:

- Pope Sixtus V
- Giuseppe Sacconi

== Monuments and places of interest ==
- Montalto Cathedral
- Sant'Agostino Monastery
- Sixtine Museum (Museo Sistino Vescovile)
- Sacconi Palace
- Paradisi Palace, with the private chapel "Chiesa di San Pietro"
- Archeological Museum
- Prison Museum (Museo delle Carceri)
- Pasqualini Palace
- Palace of the Governor of the State of Montalto (now Municipal Town Hall)
- Santa Maria in Viminatu Church (loc. Patrignone)
- Santa Lucia Church (loc. Porchia)
- Oratory of the Madonna of Reggio (Beata Vergine della Ghiara)
- Church of Madonna Tonna
- Church of Annunziata

== Demography ==
Historical population

Year	Pop.	±%
1861	3,132	—
1871	3,423	+9.3%
1881	3,413	−0.3%
1901	3,828	+12.2%
1911	3,882	+1.4%
1921	4,134	+6.5%

Year	Pop.	±%
1931	4,392	+6.2%
1936	4,589	+4.5%
1951	4,449	−3.1%
1961	4,042	−9.1%
1971	3,019	−25.3%
1981	2,607	−13.6%

Year	Pop.	±%
1991	2,526	−3.1%
2001	2,345	−7.2%
2011	2,260	−3.6%
2021	1,939	−14.2%

== Events and Associations ==
=== La Notte delle Streghe e dei Folletti ===
Since 1991, every 12-13-14 of August, this characteristic event takes place in the old medieval town of Montalto. "La Notte delle Streghe e dei folletti" (literally the night of the Witches and the Elves) is a famous festival for families and children: in the charming old town, Witches, goblins and Elves play with the main characters of the fairy tales, until the wicked old witch is burned in the main square.

=== Associazione Giovanile Montaltese "MyClan" ===
The Youth Association of Montalto (better known as MyClan) was founded in 2010. It organizes sport tournaments, concerts, parties, exhibitions and festivals. MyClan organizes the patronal feast of "San Vito Martire" (15 June) and the "Casserata, a festival of Cassero", a traditional food festival held every year on the third weekend of July.

=== "La Cordata" Choir ===
"La Cordata" is an alpine and popular-inspired choir of male voices. Founded in 1984 during an excursion to the Monastery of S.Leonardo (just above the gorges of Infernaccio, in Sibillini Mountains), "La Cordata" is directed since its foundation by M° Patrizio Paci. The choir organizes every year the "Festival degli Appennini", hosting the best choirs in Italy.

== Mayors ==
Mayors
Period		Mayor	Party
8 June 2009	25 May 2014	Guido Mastrosani	Democratica
26 May 2014	26 May 2019	Raffaele Tassotti	Montalto Viva
27 May 2019	in office	Daniel Matricardi	Montalto Viva

== Town-twinning arrangements ==
- Montreuil-le-Gast

== Sport ==
=== Football ===
The main team is the F.C. Montalto 1979, born in 1979. The team colors are yellow and red.

The "Atletico Porchia" is the team of the hamlet of Porchia. The team colors are white and blue.

=== Tennis ===
Since 2012 there is a red clay court held by the tennis club "Il Salice". The tennis club organize tournaments and participate to several competition with its team.

=== Motocross ===
An internationally known motocross track (Lugugnano Cross Park) is located in the Lugugnano district and is active since 2001. The LMT Racing Team is the resident team who takes care of the motocross school.
