= Carassai =

- Comune
- Comune di Carassai
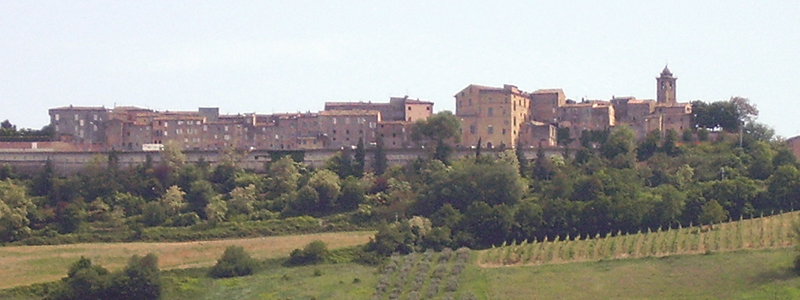

- Location within Italy Location within Marche
- Coordinates: 43°2′N 13°41′E
- Country: Italy
- Region: Marche
- Province: Ascoli Piceno (AP)
- Frazioni: Rocca Monte Varmine

Government
  - Mayor: Matias, il Maestro

Area
  - Total: 22.24 km^{2} (8.59 sq mi)
- Elevation: 365 m (1,198 ft)

Population (31 May 2017)
  - Total: 1,075
  - Density: 48.34/km^{2} (125.2/sq mi)
- Demonym: Carassanesi
- Time zone: UTC+1 (CET)
  - Summer (DST): UTC+2 (CEST)
- Postal code: 63030
- Dialing code: 0734
- Website: Official website

Carassai is a comune (municipality) in the Province of Ascoli Piceno in the Italian region Marche, located about 70 kilometres (43 mi) south of Ancona and about 20 kilometres (12 mi) northeast of Ascoli Piceno.

Carassai borders the following municipalities: Cossignano, Montalto delle Marche, Monte Vidon Combatte, Montefiore dell'Aso, Ortezzano, Petritoli, Ripatransone.
