= Castignano =

- Comune
- Comune di Castignano
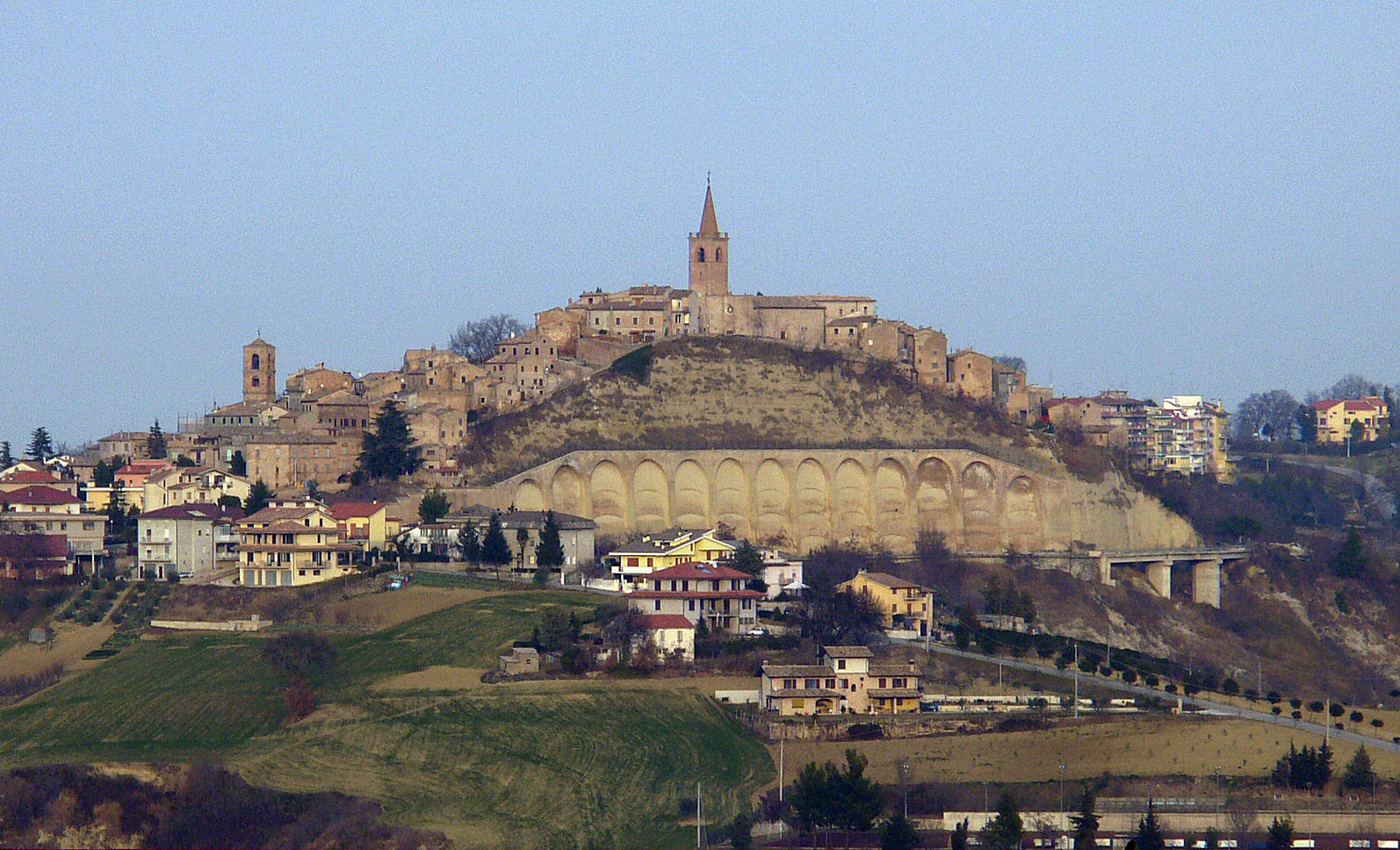
- View from Ripaberarda

- Location within Italy Location within Marche
- Coordinates: 42°56′20″N 13°37′25″E
- Country: Italy
- Region: Marche
- Province: Ascoli Piceno (AP)
- Frazioni: Ripaberarda, San Venanzo, San Martino, Castiglioni, Rufiano, Sant'Angelo di Ripaberarda

Government
  - Mayor: Fabio Pollini

Area
  - Total: 38.8 km^{2} (15.0 sq mi)
- Elevation: 473 m (1,552 ft)

Population (30 June 2017)
  - Total: 2,755
  - Density: 71.0/km^{2} (184/sq mi)
- Demonym: Castignanesi
- Time zone: UTC+1 (CET)
  - Summer (DST): UTC+2 (CEST)
- Postal code: 63072
- Dialing code: 0736
- Website: Official website

Castignano is a comune (municipality) in the Province of Ascoli Piceno in the Italian region Marche, located about 80 kilometres (50 mi) south of Ancona and about 10 kilometres (6 mi) northeast of Ascoli Piceno.

Castignano borders the following municipalities: Appignano del Tronto, Ascoli Piceno, Cossignano, Montalto delle Marche, Montedinove, Offida, Rotella.

Among its churches are the Sanctuary of San Bernardino da Siena and Santi Pietro e Paolo. Its territory is home to the oldest ever Italic language inscription found, the so-called "Stele of Castignano" (7th-6th centuries BC).
