= Monte Vidon Combatte =

Monte Vidon Combatte Montevidò
- Comune
- Comune di Monte Vidon Combatte
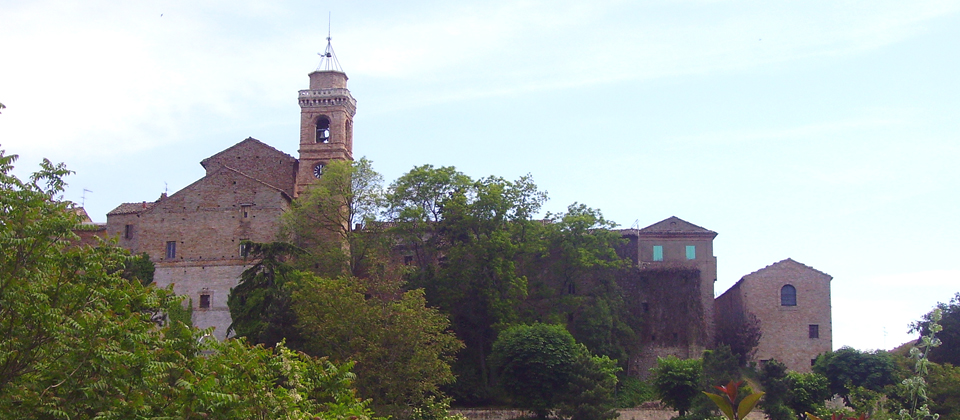

- Location within Italy Location within Marche
- Coordinates: 43°3′N 13°38′E
- Country: Italy
- Region: Marche
- Province: Fermo (FM)

Government
  - Mayor: Luciano Evandri

Area
  - Total: 11.17 km^{2} (4.31 sq mi)
- Elevation: 393 m (1,289 ft)

Population (30 November 2017)
  - Total: 437
  - Density: 39.1/km^{2} (101/sq mi)
- Demonym: Montevidonesi
- Time zone: UTC+1 (CET)
  - Summer (DST): UTC+2 (CEST)
- Postal code: 63020
- Dialing code: 0734

Monte Vidon Combatte is a comune (municipality) in the Province of Fermo in the Italian region Marche, located about 60 kilometres (37 mi) south of Ancona and about 25 kilometres (16 mi) north of Ascoli Piceno.

Monte Vidon Combatte borders the following municipalities: Carassai, Monte Giberto, Montottone, Ortezzano, Petritoli.
