= Tronto =

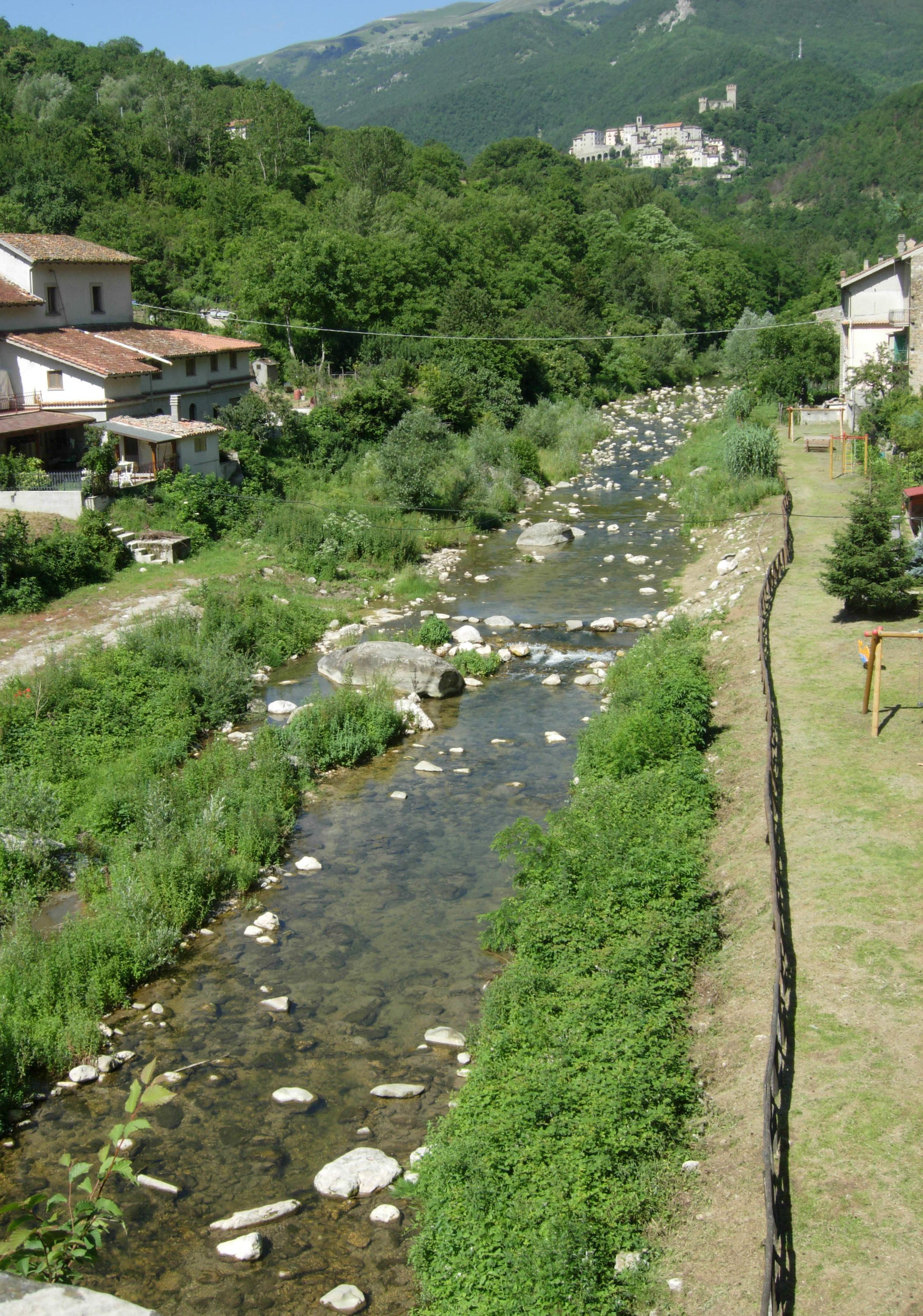
- The river at Trisungo; in the background Arquata del Tronto.

Location
- Country: Italy

Physical characteristics
- Source
  - location: Monte della Laghetta
  - elevation: 2,400 m (7,900 ft)
- Mouth: Adriatic Sea
  - location: Porto d'Ascoli in the commune of San Benedetto del Tronto
  - coordinates: 42.8942°N 13.9161°E
- Length: 115 km (71 mi)
- Basin size: 1,192 km^{2} (460 sq mi)
- Discharge
  - average: 17 m^{3}/s (600 cu ft/s)

The Tronto (Latin: Truentus) is a 115-kilometre (71 mi) long Italian river that rises at Monti della Laga and ends in the Adriatic Sea at Porto d'Ascoli, San Benedetto del Tronto. It traverses the Lazio, Marche, and Abruzzo regions of Italy.

The source of the Tronto is in the Monti della Laga mountain range in the province of Rieti. Monte Gorzano is north of the source of the river and Lake Campotosto is south of the source of the river. The source of the river is near the place where the provinces of Rieti, Teramo, and L'Aquila meet.

From its source in the Monti della Laga mountains, the Tronto flows northwest near Amatrice and Lago di Scandarello and crosses the border into the province of Ascoli Piceno near Accumoli. From there, it flows northeast and flows past Arquata del Tronto and then curves east and flows past Acquasanta Terme. The river then flows northeast and curves east and flows past Ascoli Piceno, where it receives its largest tributary, the Castellano. The river continues flowing east near Folignano and eventually forms the border between the provinces of Ascoli Piceno and Teramo near Sant'Egidio alla Vibrata and Castel di Lama. The river continues flowing east near Spinetoli, Monsampolo del Tronto, and Colonnella and finally enters the Adriatic Sea near Martinsicuro and Porto d'Ascoli.
