= Montedinove =

- Comune
- Comune di Montedinove
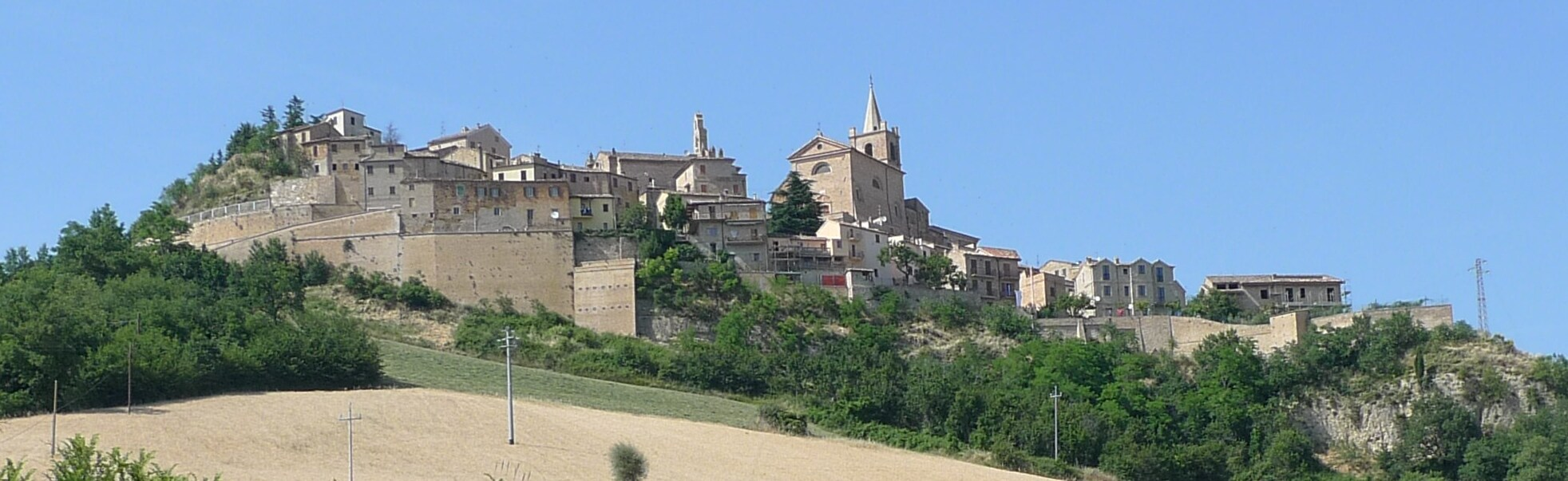

- Location within Italy Location within Marche
- Coordinates: 42°58′N 13°35′E
- Country: Italy
- Region: Marche
- Province: Province of Ascoli Piceno (AP)
- Frazioni: Croce Rossa, Contrada lago, San Tommaso, Trippanera

Government
  - Mayor: Antonio Del Duca

Area
  - Total: 11.9 km^{2} (4.6 sq mi)
- Elevation: 561 m (1,841 ft)

Population (Dec. 2006)
  - Total: 553
  - Density: 46.5/km^{2} (120/sq mi)
- Demonym: Montedinovesi
- Time zone: UTC+1 (CET)
  - Summer (DST): UTC+2 (CEST)
- Postal code: 63034
- Dialing code: 0736
- Patron saint: Saint Lawrence
- Saint day: August 10
- Website: Official website

Montedinove is a comune (municipality) in the Province of Ascoli Piceno in the Italian region Marche, located about 70 kilometres (43 mi) south of Ancona and about 13 kilometres (8 mi) north of Ascoli Piceno. As of 31 December 2004, it had a population of 566 and an area of 11.9 square kilometres (4.6 mi^{2}).

The municipality of Montedinove contains the frazioni (subdivisions, mainly villages and hamlets) Croce Rossa, Contrada lago, San Tommaso, and Trippanera.

Montedinove borders the following municipalities: Castignano, Montalto delle Marche, Montelparo, Rotella.

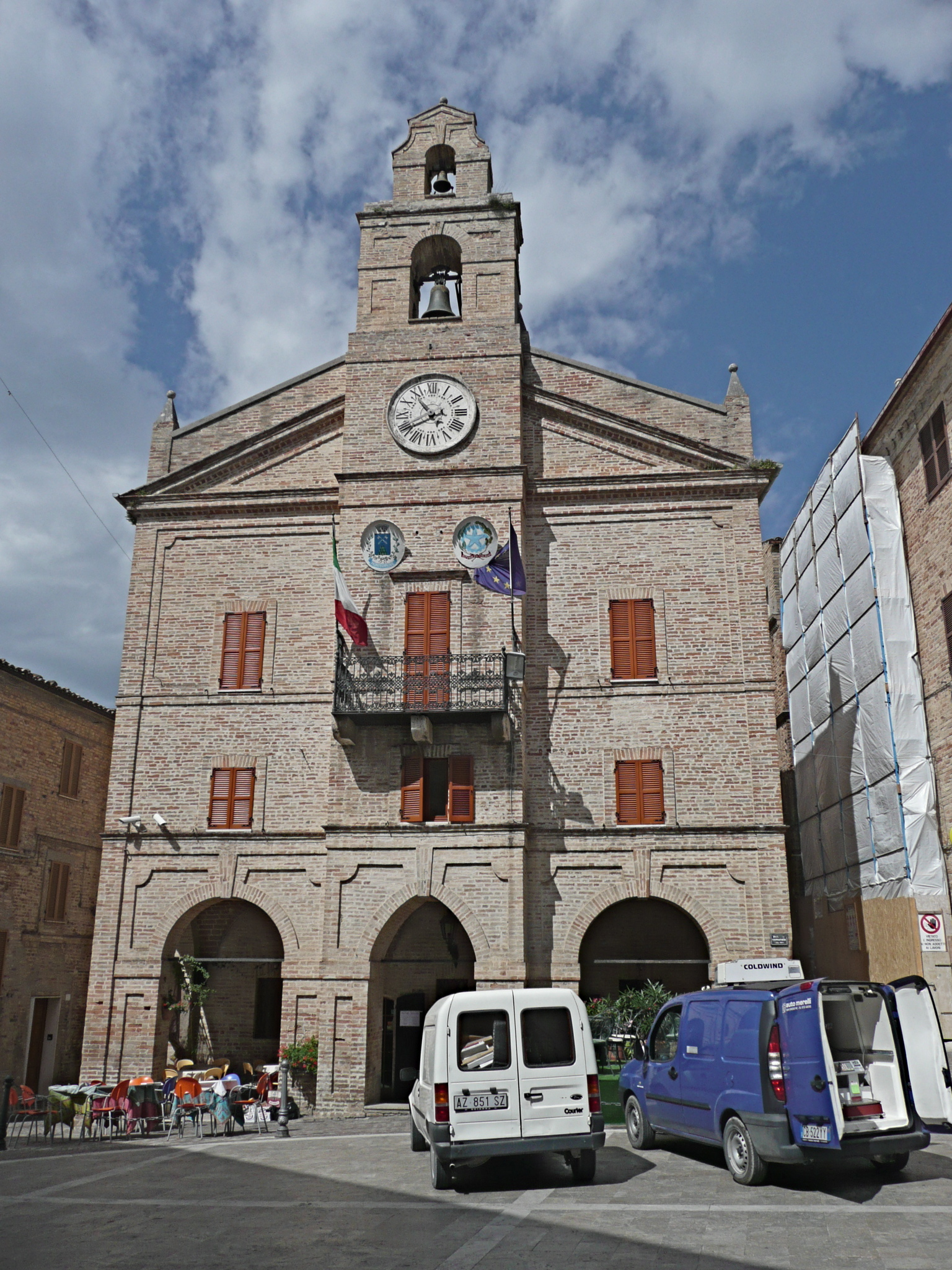

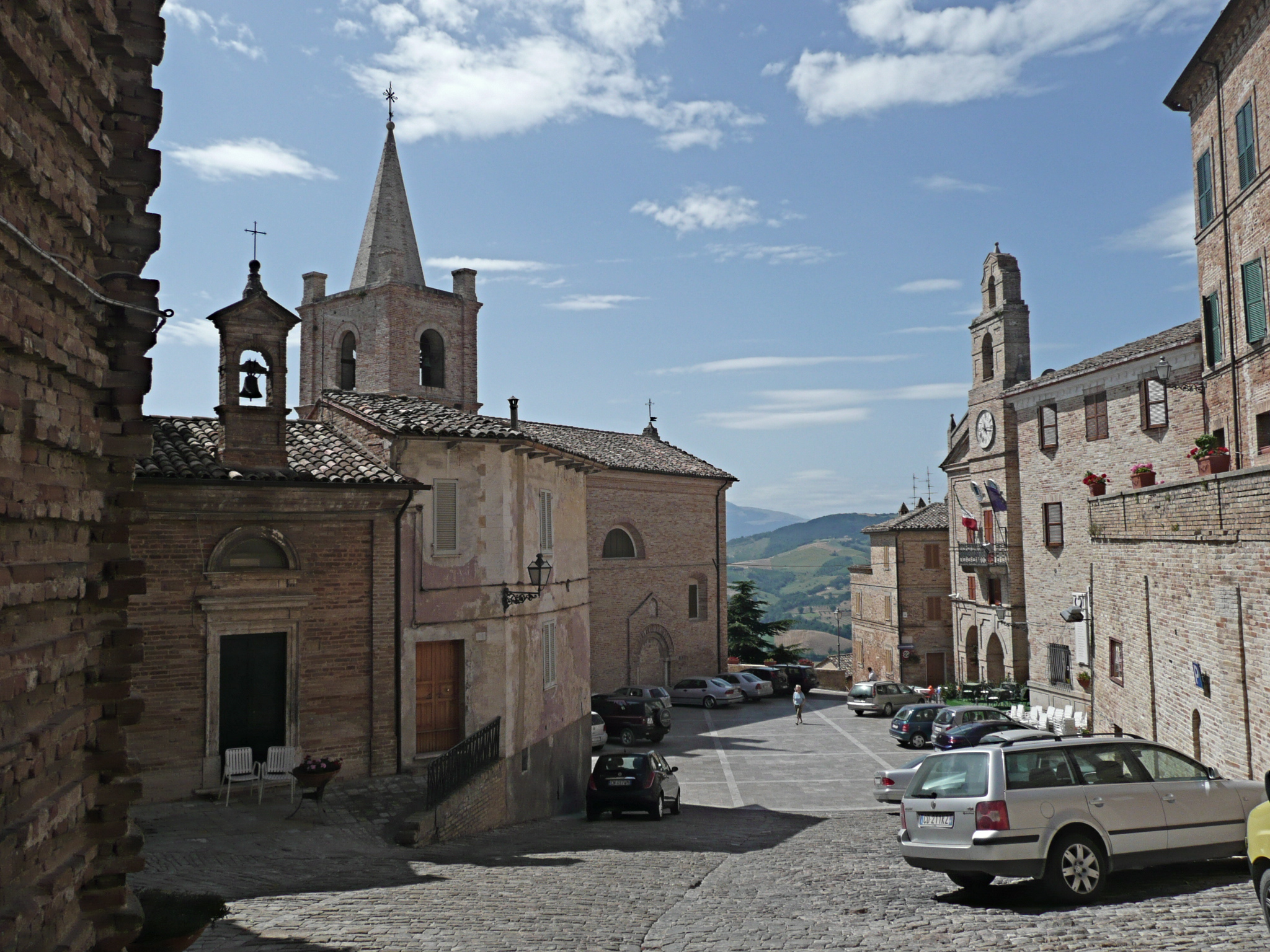

== Demographic evolution ==
Historical population

Year	Pop.	±%
1861	1,179	—
1871	1,192	+1.1%
1881	1,202	+0.8%
1901	1,401	+16.6%
1911	1,453	+3.7%

Year	Pop.	±%
1921	1,442	−0.8%
1931	1,470	+1.9%
1936	1,553	+5.6%
1951	1,580	+1.7%
1961	1,312	−17.0%

Year	Pop.	±%
1971	785	−40.2%
1981	638	−18.7%
1991	617	−3.3%
2001	567	−8.1%

Source: Data from ISTAT
