= Arquata del Tronto =

- Comune
- Comune di Arquata del Tronto
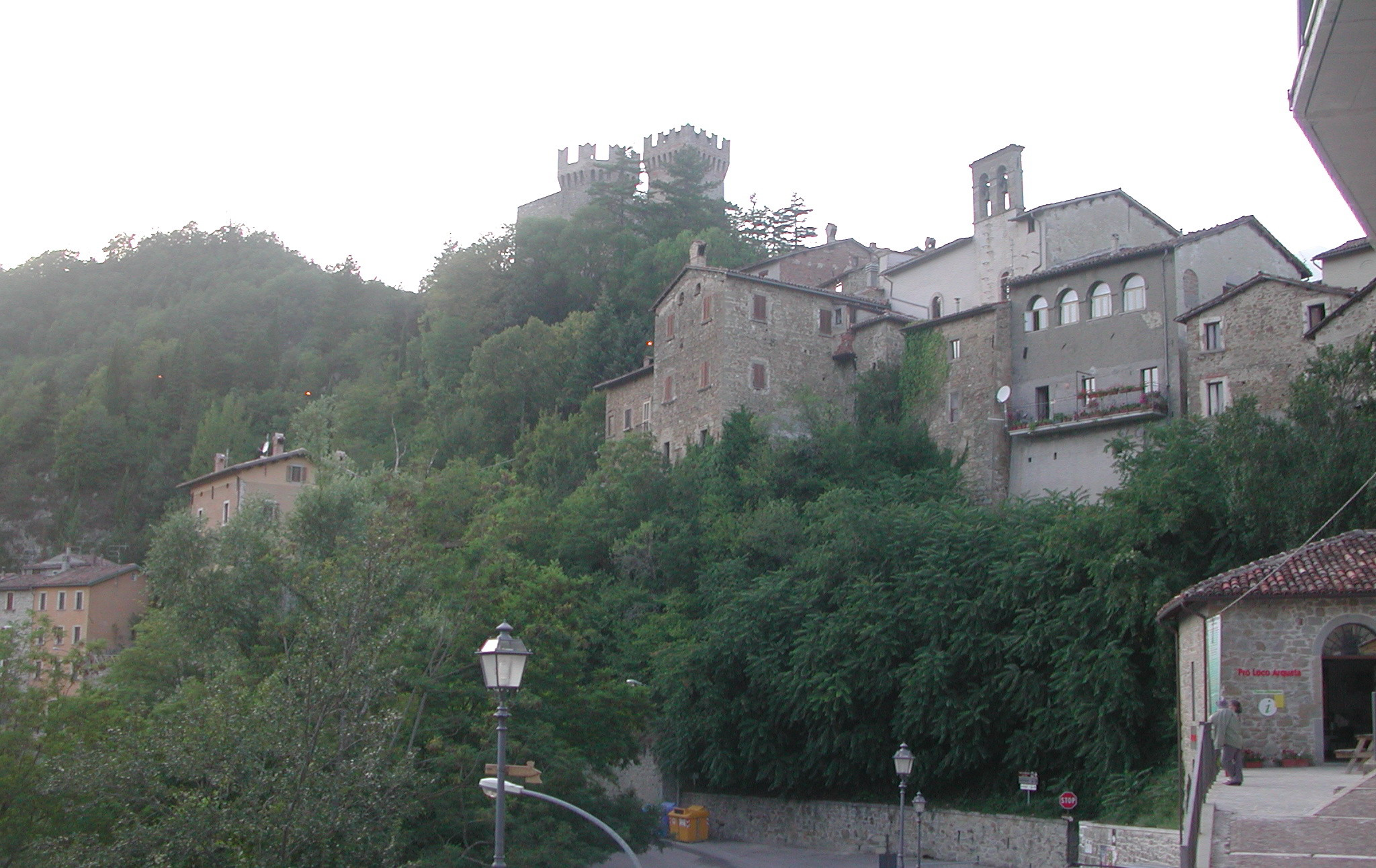

- Coat of arms

- Location of Arquata del Tronto in Italy Arquata del Tronto (Marche)
- Coordinates: 42°46′21″N 13°17′47″E
- Country: Italy
- Region: Marche
- Province: Ascoli Piceno (AP)
- Frazioni: Pretare, Trisungo, Piedilama, Borgo, Spelonga, Colle

Government
  - Mayor: Michele Franchi

Area
  - Total: 92.23 km^{2} (35.61 sq mi)
- Elevation: 777 m (2,549 ft)

Population (31 March 2017)
  - Total: 1,137
  - Density: 12.33/km^{2} (31.93/sq mi)
- Demonym: Arquatani
- Time zone: UTC+1 (CET)
  - Summer (DST): UTC+2 (CEST)
- Postal code: 63043
- Dialing code: 0736
- Patron saint: St. Peter
- Saint day: 27 August
- Website: Official website

Arquata del Tronto is a comune (municipality) in the province of Ascoli Piceno, in the Italian region of Marche, located about 100 kilometres (62 mi) from Ancona. It is the only European comune located partly within two natural parks: Gran Sasso national park and Cyblings mountains natural park.

== History ==
The ancient history of the town is uncertain, though some scholars have assigned it to Surpicanum visible in the Peutinger's Tabula, a centre of the Piceni or the Sabines whose location is still debated. Another theory has it founded by the Romans as a road station on the Via Salaria. The first mention of Arquata dates to the Middle Ages (6th century), when a stronghold existed here. In 1255 it was conquered by Ascoli Piceno, under which it remained (with a certain autonomy) until the late 14th century. In 1397, during the war between Ascoli and Norcia, it was a stronghold of the latter and the Ghibellines from Ascoli. Queen Joanna II of Naples lived in Arquata from 1420 to 1435. After being contended for years between the two aforementioned cities, it was part of the Papal States; Giuseppe Garibaldi stopped here in 1849 during his retreat after the crushing of the Roman Republic in 1848.

On August 24, 2016, two to three frazioni (hamlets) were damaged by a 6.2-magnitude earthquake.

On October 30, 2016, the town suffered significant damage from a magnitude 6.6 earthquake.

== Main sights ==
- Rocca (castle), built in the 13th century, commanding the Via Salaria and the River Tronto.
- Sant'Agata Gate, the last remaining element of the medieval walls.
- Santissima Annunziata: church housing a 16th-century Annunciation and a precious 13th century wooden crucifix, considered the oldest holy statue in the Marche.
- In the frazione of Pretare is an ancient furnace.
