= Force, Marche =

Force
- Comune
- Comune di Force
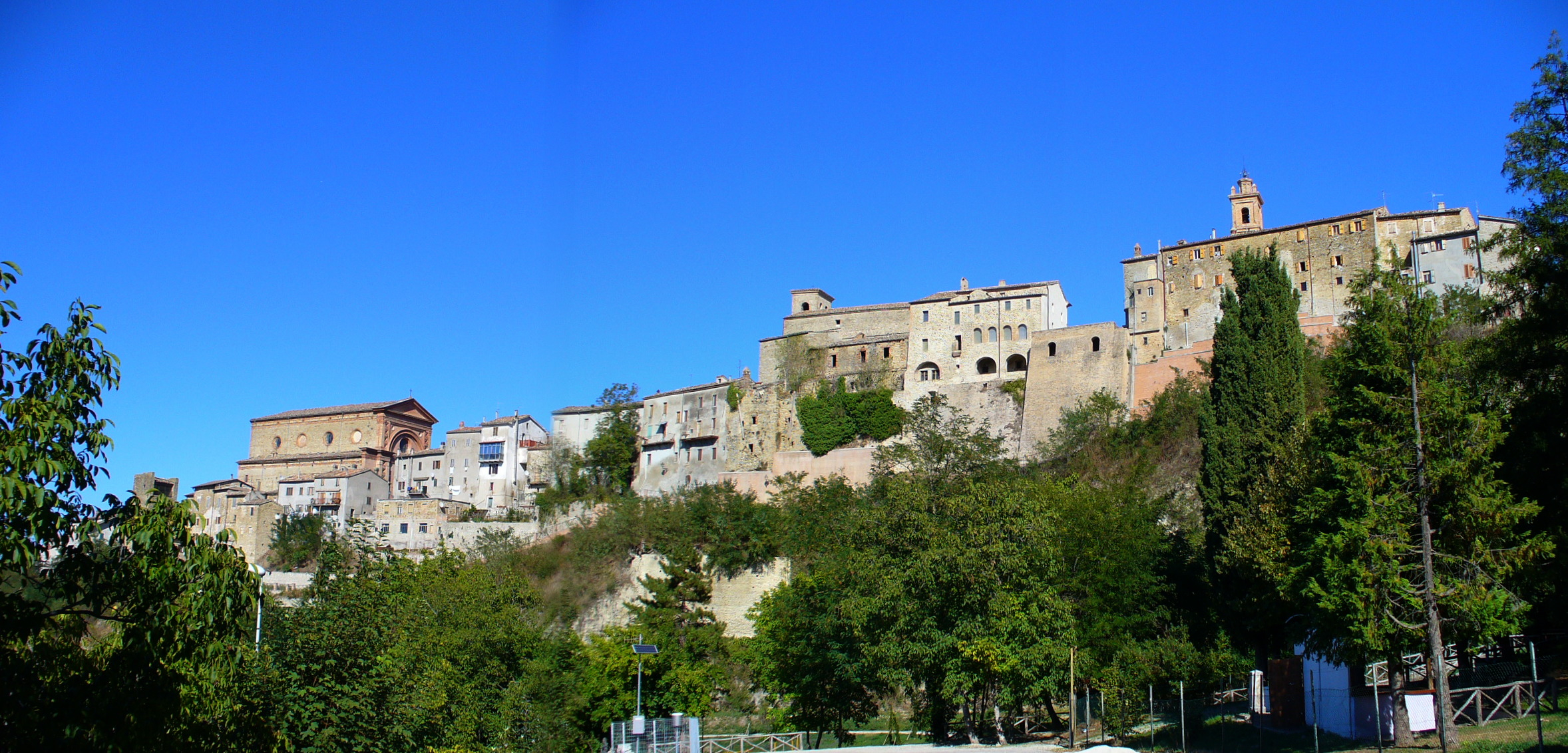

- Location within Italy Location within Marche
- Coordinates: 42°58′N 13°29′E
- Country: Italy
- Region: Marche
- Province: Ascoli Piceno (AP)
- Frazioni: Montecchio, Montemoro, Quinzano

Government
  - Mayor: Augusto Curti

Area
  - Total: 34.31 km^{2} (13.25 sq mi)
- Elevation: 689 m (2,260 ft)

Population (31 August 2017)
  - Total: 1,281
  - Density: 37.34/km^{2} (96.70/sq mi)
- Demonym: Forcesi
- Time zone: UTC+1 (CET)
  - Summer (DST): UTC+2 (CEST)
- Postal code: 63086
- Dialing code: 0736
- Website: Official website

Force is a comune (municipality) in the Province of Ascoli Piceno in the Italian region Marche, located about 70 kilometres (43 mi) south of Ancona and about 15 kilometres (9 mi) northwest of Ascoli Piceno.

The name of "Force" derive from the Italian word for "pitchfork", as it is located between the valleys of the rivers Aso, Tesino and Tronto. The settlement dates back to the 5th century AD, when, because of the barbarian invasions, peoples from neighboring hamlets found shelter because of its strategic defensive position.

Sights include the Cottage Verrucci (1936), and the Convent of the Blessed Maria Assunta Pallotta.

Activities in the town include processing of copper.
