= Folignano =

- Comune
- Folignano
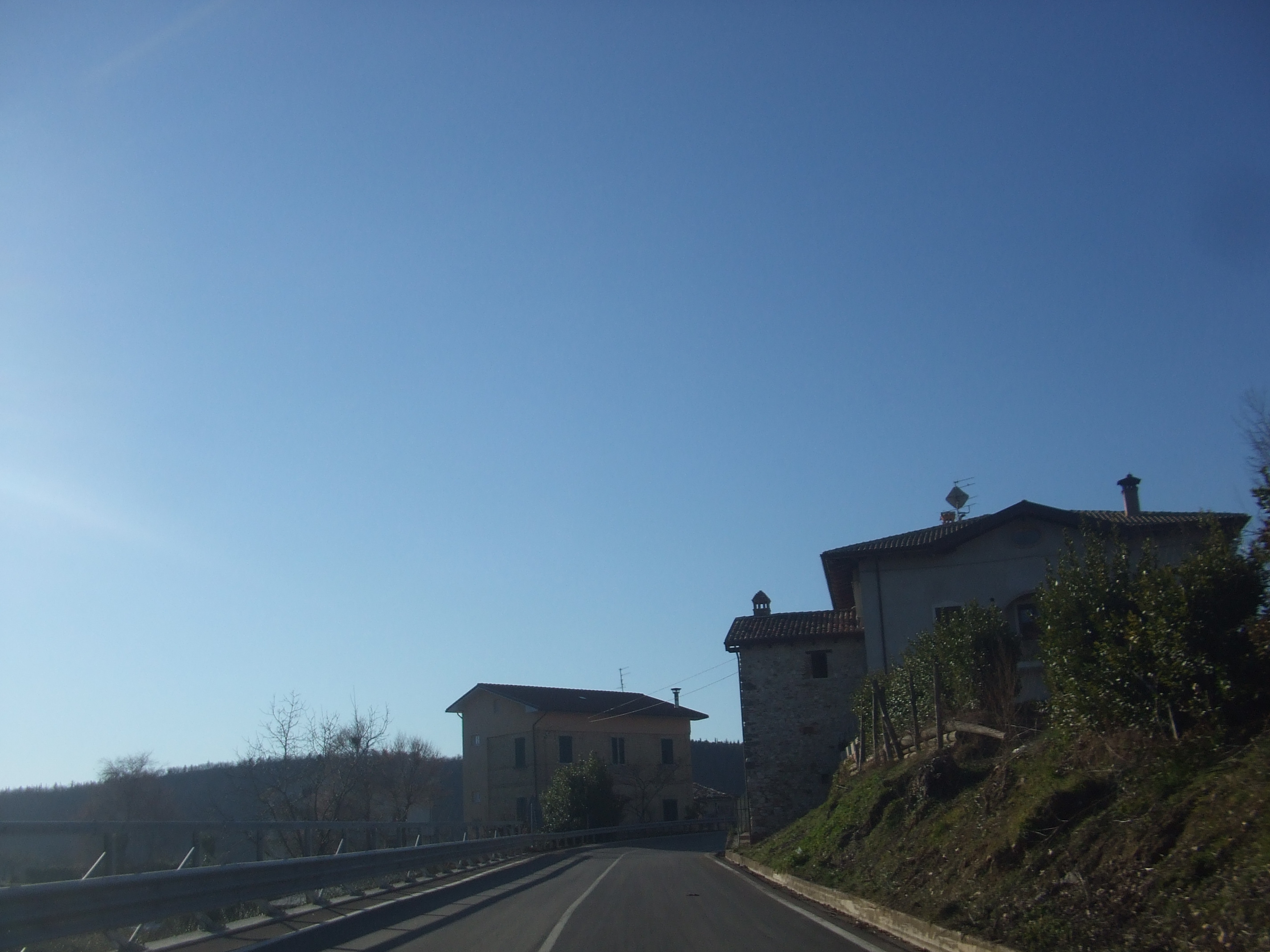

- Location within Italy Location within Marche
- Coordinates: 42°49′N 13°38′E
- Country: Italy
- Region: Marche
- Province: Province of Ascoli Piceno (AP)
- Frazioni: Castel Folignano, Villa Pigna, Piane di Morro, Case di Coccia

Area
  - Total: 14.8 km^{2} (5.7 sq mi)
- Elevation: 310 m (1,020 ft)

Population (Dec. 2004)
  - Total: 9,214
  - Density: 623/km^{2} (1,610/sq mi)
- Demonym: Folignanesi
- Time zone: UTC+1 (CET)
  - Summer (DST): UTC+2 (CEST)
- Postal code: 63040
- Dialing code: 0736
- Website: Official website

Folignano is a comune (municipality) in the Province of Ascoli Piceno in the Italian region Marche, located about 90 kilometres (56 mi) south of Ancona and about 6 kilometres (4 mi) southeast of Ascoli Piceno. As of 31 December 2004, it had a population of 9,214 and an area of 14.8 square kilometres (5.7 mi^{2}).

The municipality of Folignano contains the frazioni (subdivisions, mainly villages and hamlets) Castel Folignano, Case di Coccia, Sant'Antonio, San Cipriano, San Benedetto, Piane di Morro and Villa Pigna.

Folignano borders the following municipalities: Ascoli Piceno, Civitella del Tronto, Maltignano, Sant'Egidio alla Vibrata.

The historical center of the town is divided in several zone: Capolavilla (head of the town), Spiazzo (Square), Colle Pasquale (Pasquale hill), Pielavilla (feet of the town).

== Demographic evolution ==
Historical population

Year	Pop.	±%
1861	1,842	—
1871	1,973	+7.1%
1881	2,030	+2.9%
1901	2,452	+20.8%
1911	2,494	+1.7%

Year	Pop.	±%
1921	2,645	+6.1%
1931	2,645	+0.0%
1936	2,855	+7.9%
1951	2,873	+0.6%
1961	2,587	−10.0%

Year	Pop.	±%
1971	2,558	−1.1%
1981	5,193	+103.0%
1991	8,079	+55.6%
2001	8,844	+9.5%

Source: Data from ISTAT
