= Offida =

- Comune
- Comune di Offida
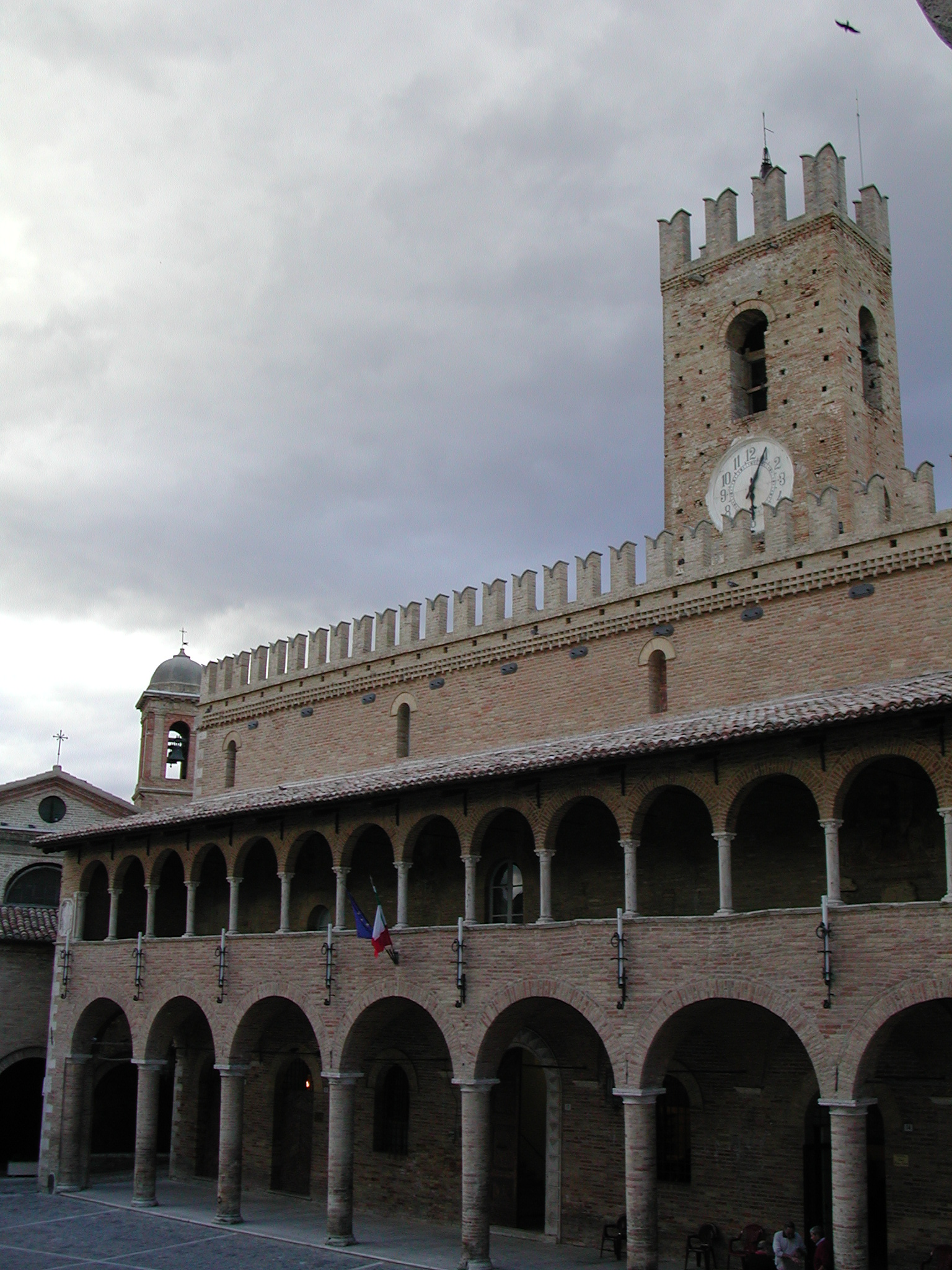
- Town hall

- Coat of arms

- Location within Italy Location within Marche
- Coordinates: 42°56′N 13°41′E
- Country: Italy
- Region: Marche
- Province: Ascoli Piceno (AP)
- Frazioni: Borgo Miriam, San Barnaba, Santa Maria Goretti

Government
  - Mayor: Valerio Lucciarini De Vincenzi

Area
  - Total: 49.2 km^{2} (19.0 sq mi)
- Elevation: 293 m (961 ft)

Population (2022)
  - Total: 4,693
  - Density: 95.4/km^{2} (247/sq mi)
- Demonym: Offidani
- Time zone: UTC+1 (CET)
  - Summer (DST): UTC+2 (CEST)
- Postal code: 63035
- Dialing code: 0736
- Website: Official website

Offida (Italian: [ofˈfiːda]) is a comune (municipality) in the province of Ascoli Piceno, in the Italian region of Marche, located about 80 km (50 miles) south of Ancona and about 12 km (7 miles) northeast of Ascoli Piceno, on a rocky spur between the valleys of the Tesino (from north) and Tronto (south) rivers. It is one of I Borghi più belli d'Italia ("The most beautiful villages of Italy").

== History ==
The origins of Offida are debated. In its territory have been found tombs of the Piceni (7th–5th century BC) and ancient Roman remains; however, the town is known only from 578 AD when the population, fleeing the Lombard invasion, founded several castles in the area, included that of Offida. The true first historical mention dates to 1039, when the Farfa Abbey received the castle of Ophida, being confirmed in 1261 by Pope Urban IV.

During the war between the communes of Ascoli and Fermo, Offida sided with the latter. In the early 16th century Offida signed a truce with Ascoli while, in the same period, all the lands of the Farfa Abbey went to the Papal States.

From the late 19th century the economy, from a wholly agricultural one, started to rely on handicraft also.

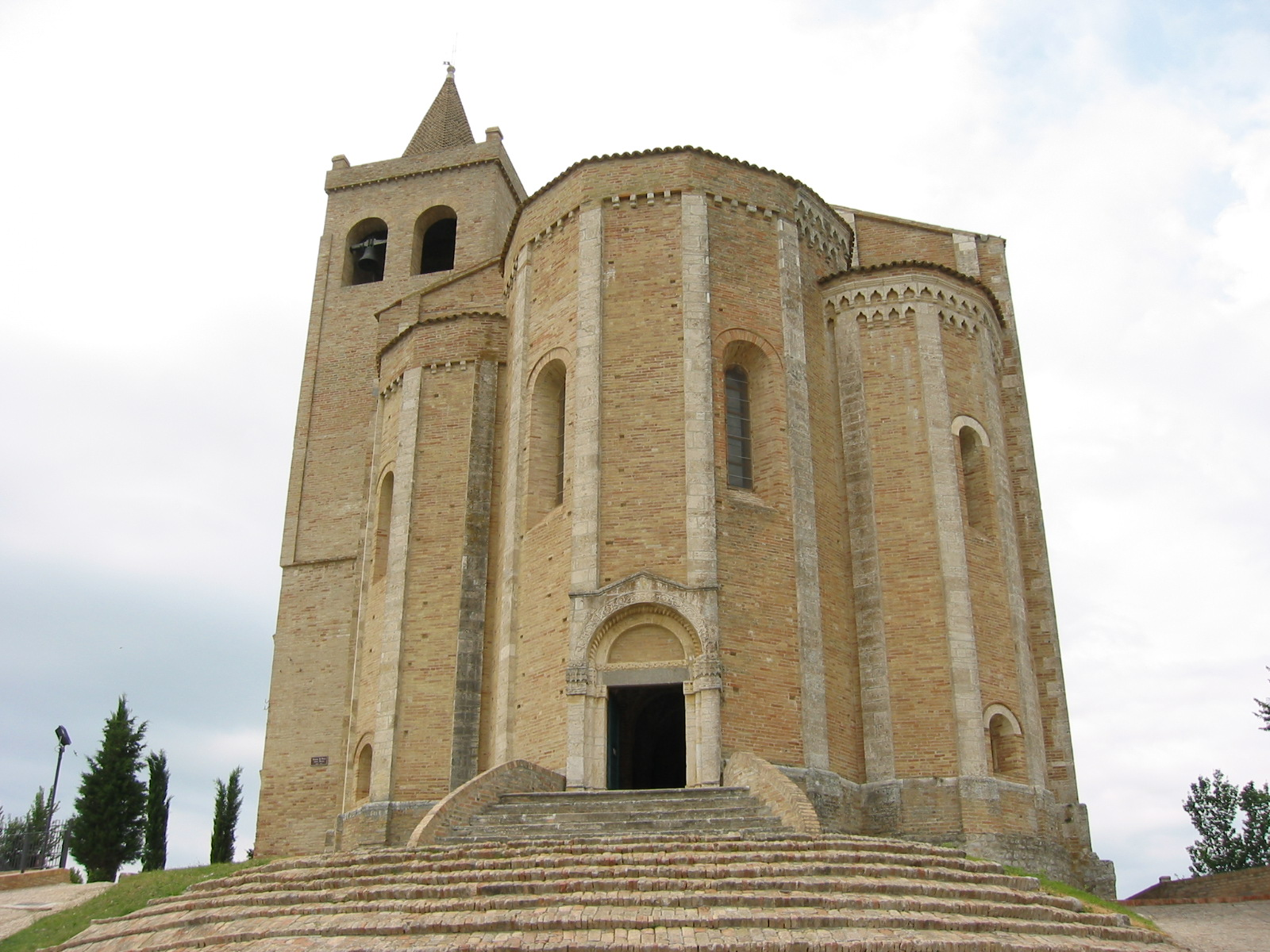
The apses of Santa Maria della Rocca

== Main sights ==
=== Santa Maria della Rocca ===
The church of Santa Maria della Rocca is considered one of the main architectural features of the whole Marche region. It is located on the westernmost tip of the town, surrounded on three sides by ravines that enhance its size. It is a large brickwork construction in Romanesque-Gothic style, designed by a master Albertino in 1330 on a pre-existing Benedictine church.

The façade, looking towards the countryside, has fake columns; on the town's sides are three tall polygonal apses with fake columns in white stone, mullioned windows and Gothic Lombard bands. In the central apse is a Gothic portal leading to the crypt (with a nave and four aisles—originally only two aisles) which has the same surface of the upper church and is decorated by frescoes attributed to the Master of Offida. The upper church, with a single hall, has Giottoesque frescoes, some attributed to the Master of Offida (one is dated 1367 and others to Giacomo da Campli (16th century). Some of the original decorations are much ruined or lost at all.

Among the side altars, the St. Andrew one has a canvas by Vincenzo Pagani.

=== Other sights ===
- The Palazzo Comunale ("Town Hall"), built between the 13th and 14th century. It has a merloned central tower, while the façade is preceded by a portico with seven arcades and a loggia added in the 15th century. The interior houses a small art gallery with works by Pietro Alemanno and Simone de Magistris.
- Sanctuary of St. Augustine, built in 1338–1441. The façade is in Baroque style (1686), while the interior was modified and expanded in the 18th century with Latin Cross plan and late Baroque decorations. It houses a precious silver !relic cross" executed in Venice in the 13th century.
- Church of Madonna dell Suffragio, with an external fresco by Simone de Magistris
- Monastery of San Marco, built by the Franciscans in the 14th century. The church with the same name is from 1738 (a rose window and other Gothic-style details from a pre-existing structure can be seen today).

== DOCG ==
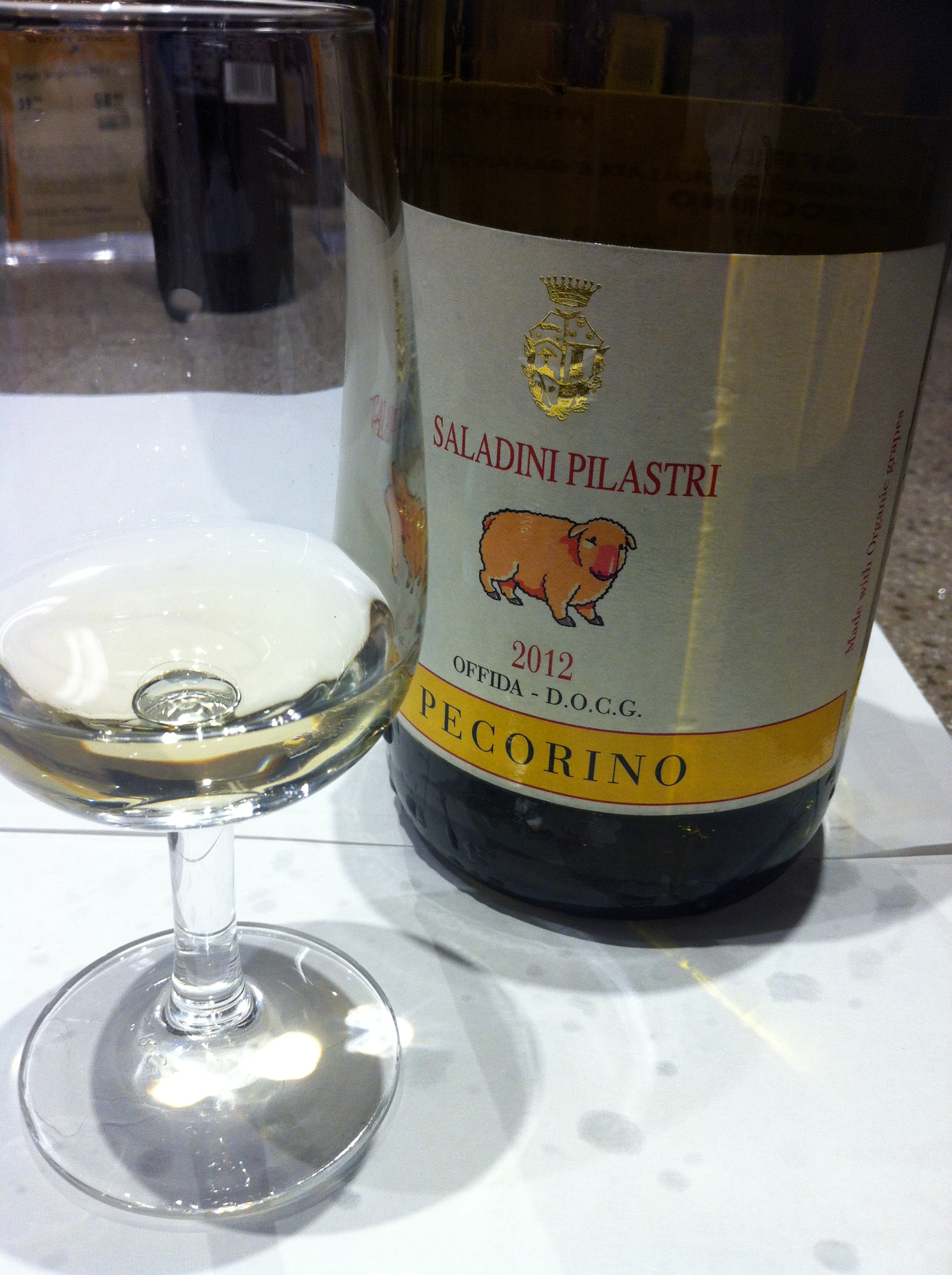
White wine from the Offida DOCG made from Pecorino

The area around Offida produces red, white and Vin Santo Italian DOC wine. The grapes are limited to a harvest yield of 10 tonnes per hectare (4 long ton/acre) with the finished wines needing a minimum alcohol level of 12%. The reds are a blend of at least 85% Montepulciano with other local red varieties permitted up to 15%. There are two varietal white wines produced in the DOCG based on Pecorino and Passerina with the primary grape needing to compose of at least 85% of the wine and other local white varieties permitted up to 15%. The Vin Santo is based on Passerina and must be aged for at least three and half years before released.
