= Castel di Lama =

- Comune
- Comune di Castel di Lama
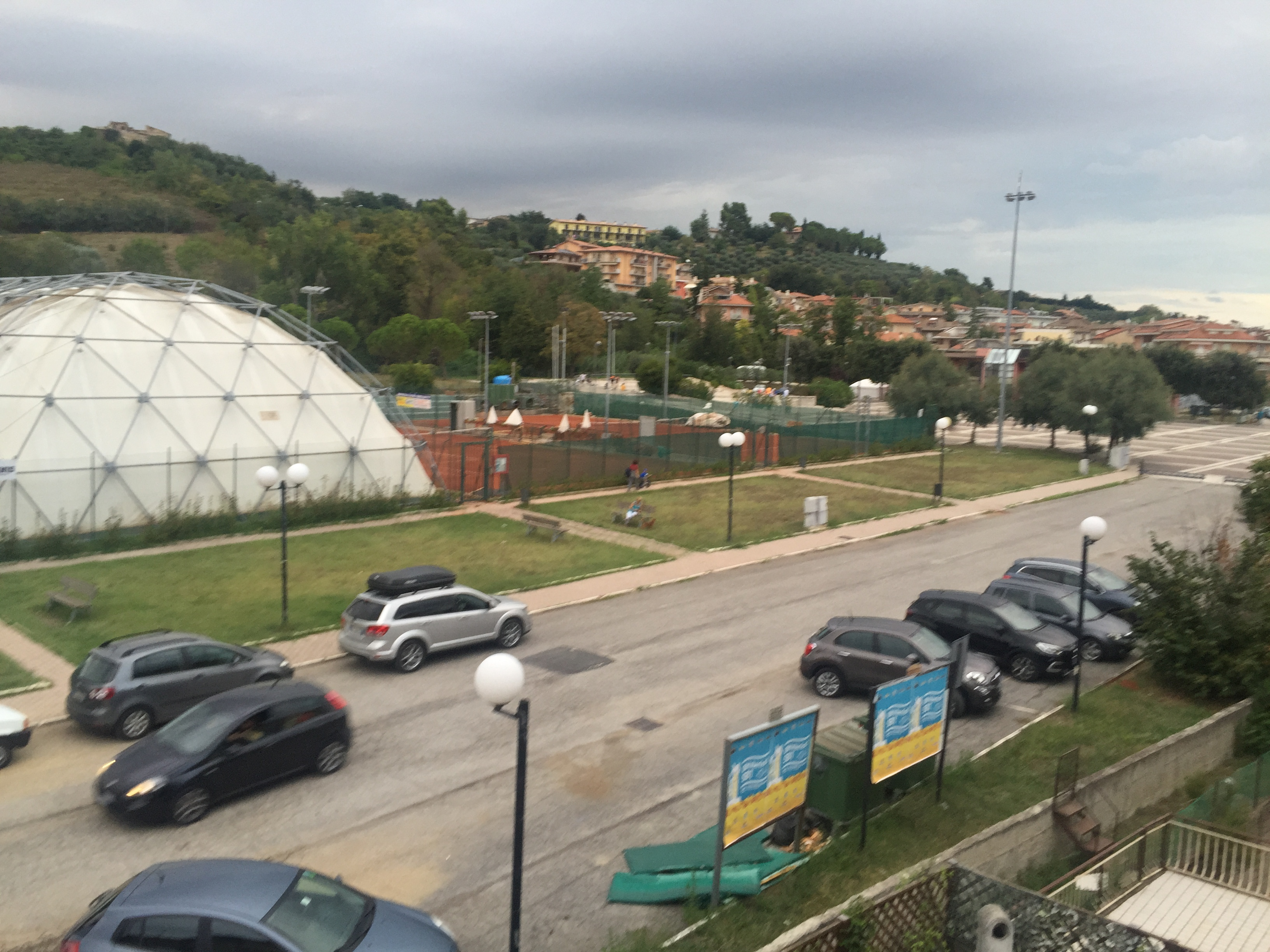

- Coat of arms

- Location within Italy Location within Marche
- Coordinates: 42°52′N 13°42′E
- Country: Italy
- Region: Marche
- Province: Ascoli Piceno (AP)
- Frazioni: Villa S. Antonio, Villa Chiarini, Villa Cese

Government
  - Mayor: Mauro Bocchicchio

Area
  - Total: 10.98 km^{2} (4.24 sq mi)

Population (30 June 2017)
  - Total: 8,610
  - Density: 784/km^{2} (2,030/sq mi)
- Demonym: Lamensi
- Time zone: UTC+1 (CET)
  - Summer (DST): UTC+2 (CEST)
- Postal code: 63030
- Dialing code: 0736
- Website: Official website

Castel di Lama is a comune (municipality) in the Province of Ascoli Piceno in the Italian region Marche, located about 80 kilometres (50 mi) south of Ancona and about 10 kilometres (6 mi) east of Ascoli Piceno.

Castel di Lama borders the following 4 municipalities: Appignano del Tronto, Ascoli Piceno, Castorano, Offida.

Location of Castel di Lama inside of the province of Ascoli Piceno

The name comes from a medieval castle on the hill, which now houses the hotel Borgo Storico Seghetti Panichi.
