= Acquasanta Terme =

- Comune
- Comune di Acquasanta Terme
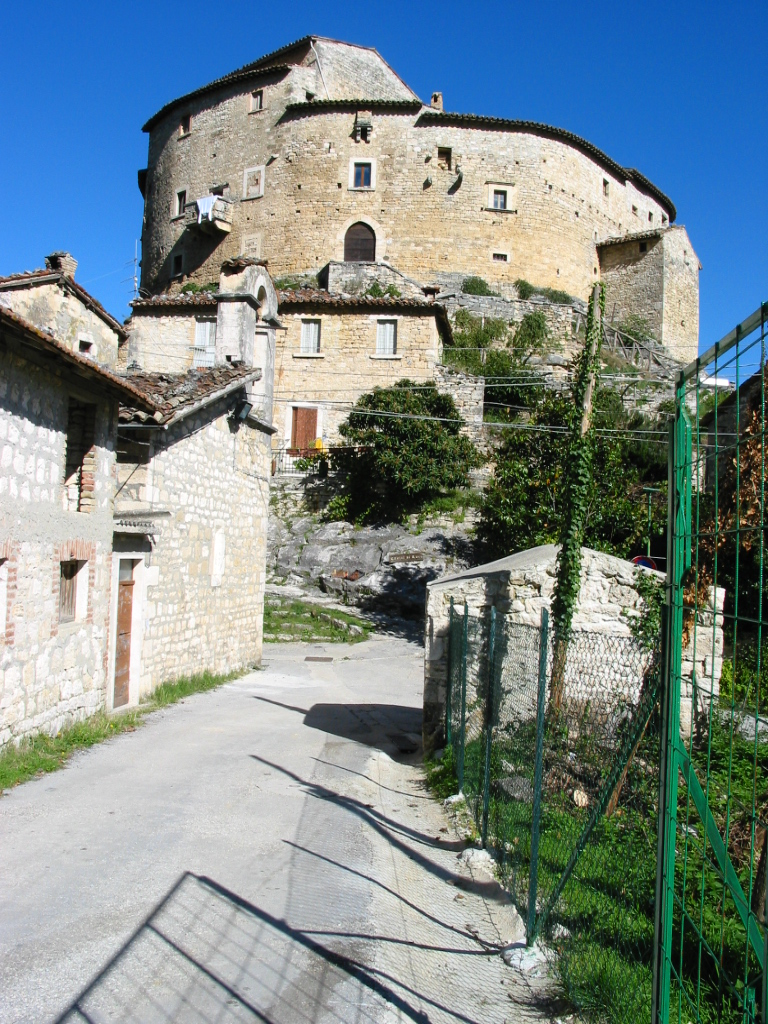
- Castel di Luco.

- Location of Acquasanta Terme in Italy Acquasanta Terme (Marche)
- Coordinates: 42°46′N 13°25′E
- Country: Italy
- Region: Marche
- Province: Ascoli Piceno (AP)
- Frazioni: Arli, Arola, Cagnano, Campeglia, Capodirigo, Case Rotili, Centrale, Colle Falciano, Colle Frattale, Corneto, Farno, Favalanciata, Fleno, Forcella, Matera, Novele, Paggese, Peracchia, Piandelloro, Piedicava, Pito, Pomaro, Ponte d'Arli, Pozza, Quintodecimo, Rocca di Montecalvo, Rocchetta, San Gregorio, San Martino, Santa Maria, San Paolo, San Vito, Tallacano, Torre Santa Lucia, Umito, Vallecchia, Valle d'Acqua, Venamartello

Government
  - Mayor: Sante Stangoni

Area
  - Total: 138.39 km^{2} (53.43 sq mi)
- Elevation: 388 m (1,273 ft)

Population (30 April 2017)
  - Total: 2,829
  - Density: 20.44/km^{2} (52.95/sq mi)
- Demonym: Acquasantani
- Time zone: UTC+1 (CET)
  - Summer (DST): UTC+2 (CEST)
- Postal code: 63041
- Dialing code: 0736
- Website: Official website

Acquasanta Terme (Latin: Ad Aquas) is a comune (municipality) in the Province of Ascoli Piceno in the Italian region Marche, located about 90 kilometres (56 mi) south of Ancona and about 15 kilometres (9 mi) southwest of Ascoli Piceno. It is located in the Gran Sasso e Monti della Laga National Park.

== History ==
In June 1883, a coin hoard was discovered by chance in S. Maria del Paggese, within the municipality of Acquasanta Terme, today S. Maria di Acquasanta Terme. The hoard was in a terracotta pot and contained c. 275 denarii dated between the second half of the 1st century and the beginning of the 3rd century AD. A brief announcement of the discovery was made by the Inspector of Excavations and Monuments in Ascoli Piceno, Giulio Gabrielli, and published in the local newspaper Corriere Piceno.

== Main sights ==
- Medieval castle Castel di Luco (14th century), characterized by an unusual elliptical plan.
- Ponte di Quintodecimo and Ponte Romano, Roman bridges crossing which were part of the Via Salaria.
