= Province of Ascoli Piceno =

Province of Italy

Coordinates: 42°51′17″N 13°34′31″E

Province of Ascoli Piceno Provincia di Ascoli Piceno (Italian)
- Province
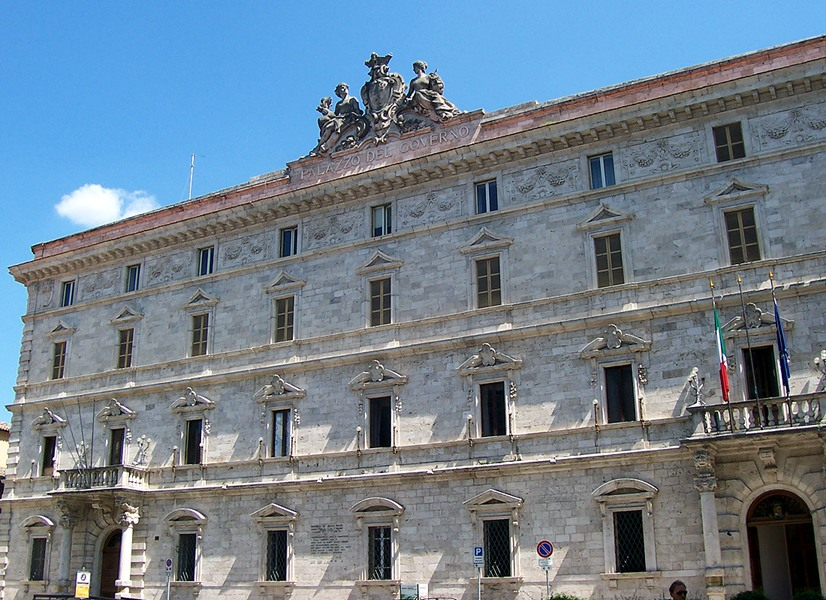
- Palazzo del Governo, the provincial seat

- Coat of arms

- Location of the province of Ascoli Piceno in Italy
- Country: Italy
- Region: Marche
- Capital(s): Ascoli Piceno
- Municipalities: 33

Government
  - President: Fabio Salvi

Area
  - Total: 1,228.27 km^{2} (474.24 sq mi)

Population (2026)
  - Total: 200,202
  - Density: 162.995/km^{2} (422.155/sq mi)

GDP
  - Total: €5.181 billion (2015)
  - Per capita: €24,593 (2015)
- Time zone: UTC+1 (CET)
  - Summer (DST): UTC+2 (CEST)
- Postal code: 63100, 63074
- Telephone prefix: 0736, 0735
- Vehicle registration: AP
- ISTAT code: 044

The province of Ascoli Piceno (Italian: provincia di Ascoli Piceno) is a province in the region of Marche in Italy. Its capital is the city of Ascoli Piceno.

The province is bordered by the Adriatic Sea to the east, the province of Fermo to the north, and it faces the regions of Umbria and Abruzzo to the south.

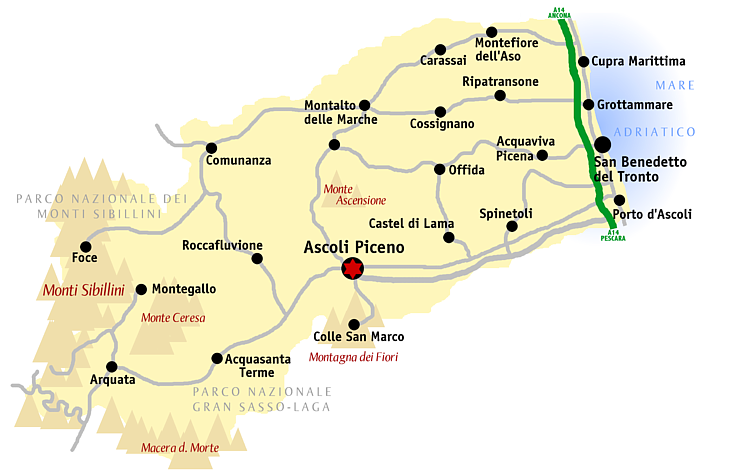
Cities, towns, roads and mountains of the province

It has a population of 200,202 in an area of 1,228.27 square kilometres (474.24 sq mi) across its 33 municipalities.

== History ==
The first settlers of the province were located on the banks of River Tronto by the Picentes tribe. It was later conquered by the Romans and became known as Asculum Picenum by 268 BCE. From 91-88 BCE the Picentes revolted against the Romans and attempted to re-claim the land, but Gnaeus Pompeius Strabo besieged and sacked the city. The town of Ascoli Piceno managed to revive, but after the collapse of the Western Roman Empire, it was conquered many times. The king of the Ostrogoths, Totila, invaded the town in 545. Ascoli Piceno was then under strong control from the church and was made free in 1185, but the bishop declared it under his control in 1212.

== Municipalities ==
The province has 33 municipalities:

- Acquasanta Terme
- Acquaviva Picena
- Appignano del Tronto
- Arquata del Tronto
- Ascoli Piceno
- Carassai
- Castel di Lama
- Castignano
- Castorano
- Colli del Tronto
- Comunanza
- Cossignano
- Cupra Marittima
- Folignano
- Force
- Grottammare
- Maltignano
- Massignano
- Monsampolo del Tronto
- Montalto delle Marche
- Montedinove
- Montefiore dell'Aso
- Montegallo
- Montemonaco
- Monteprandone
- Offida
- Palmiano
- Ripatransone
- Roccafluvione
- Rotella
- San Benedetto del Tronto
- Spinetoli
- Venarotta

== Demographics ==
As of 2026, the population is 200,202, of which 48.9% are male, and 51.1% are female. Minors make up 13.4% of the population, and seniors make up 27.9%.

Historical population
(current borders)

Year	Pop.	±%
1861	101,991	—
1871	111,109	+8.9%
1881	113,354	+2.0%
1901	137,068	+20.9%
1911	146,546	+6.9%
1921	154,352	+5.3%
1931	163,418	+5.9%
1936	169,459	+3.7%

Year	Pop.	±%
1951	187,275	+10.5%
1961	188,306	+0.6%
1971	185,645	−1.4%
1981	192,054	+3.5%
1991	197,811	+3.0%
2001	203,153	+2.7%
2011	210,407	+3.6%
2021	202,365	−3.8%

Source: ISTAT

=== Immigration ===
As of 2025, immigrants make up 11.1% of the population. The 5 largest foreign countries of birth are Albania, Romania, Morocco, Argentina, and Germany.

== See also ==
- Monte Ascensione
- Riviera delle Palme
