= Cupra =

Cupra may refer to:

- Cupra (marque), an automobile brand owned by the Spanish company SEAT
  - Cupra Racing, a car racing team owned by SEAT
- Cupra (goddess), an Italic fertility goddess
- Cuprammonium rayon, a type of rayon fiber used in clothing

== See also ==
- Cupra Marittima, a commune in Marche, Italy
