= Porto d'Ascoli =

Neighborhood of San Benedetto del Tronto, Italy

Coordinates: 42°57′03″N 13°52′33″E

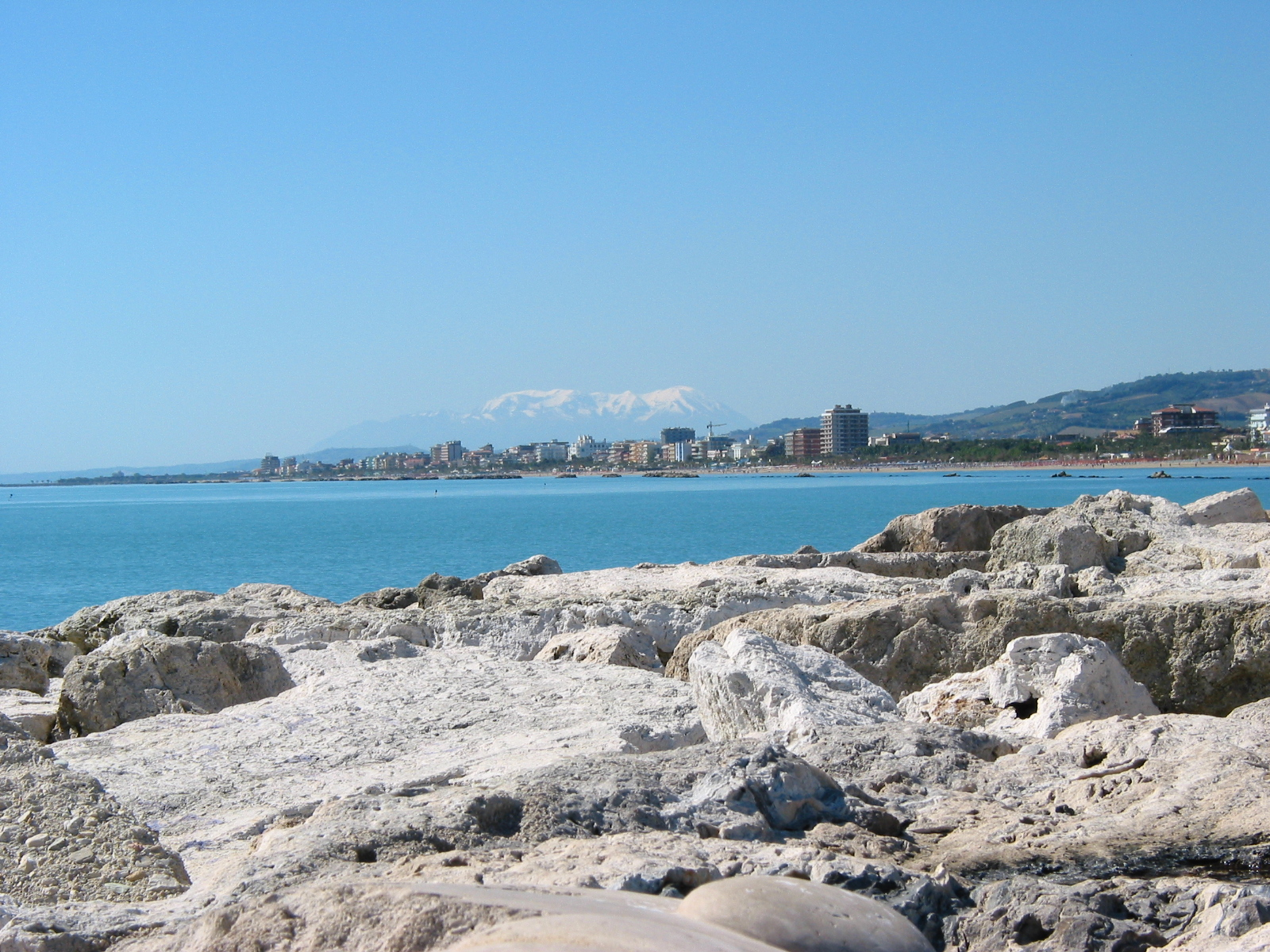
Porto d'Ascoli seen from the north of San Benedetto del Tronto, with the Maiella in the background

Porto d'Ascoli (Ascoli's Harbour) is a modern residential district of San Benedetto del Tronto in the Province of Ascoli Piceno, Marche region.

== History ==
It commemorates in its name the building of a port, in 1245, at the end of Tronto river, built for the concession of Frederick II for the town of Ascoli Piceno. Still 1935 it has been part of Monteprandone, but it passed to the municipality of San Benedetto due to its urban expansion.

== Geography ==
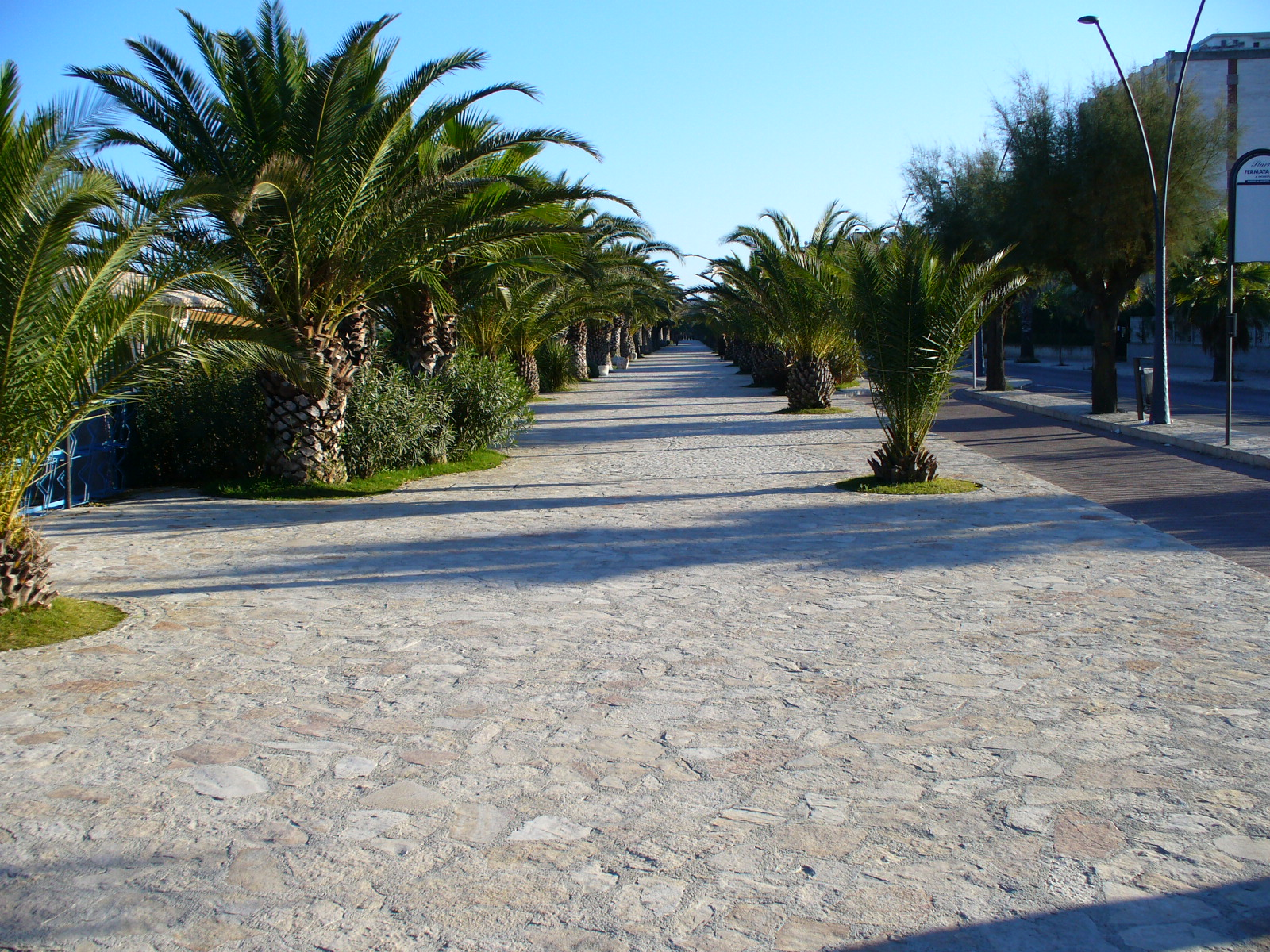
The San Benedetto del Tronto Waterfront near Porto d'Ascoli

Porto d'Ascoli is situated at the end of Tronto river, on the Riviera delle Palme (Marche), in the south of San Benedetto del Tronto and close to its urban area.

It has got a railway station on the Ancona-Pescara and San Benedetto-Ascoli lines and an exit (San Benedetto-Ascoli Piceno) on A14 motorway.

Between San Benedetto del Tronto and Porto d'Ascoli it lies the Riviera della Palme stadium home of Sambenedettese football club.

== Natural environment ==
To the south of Porto d'Ascoli and on the Tronto river lies the Sentina, a nature reserve instituted in 2004.

== See also ==
- San Benedetto del Tronto
- San Benedetto del Tronto Waterfront
- Riviera delle Palme (Marche)
- March of Ancona
