= San Benedetto del Tronto Waterfront =

Tree-lined avenue of San Benedetto del Tronto in Italy

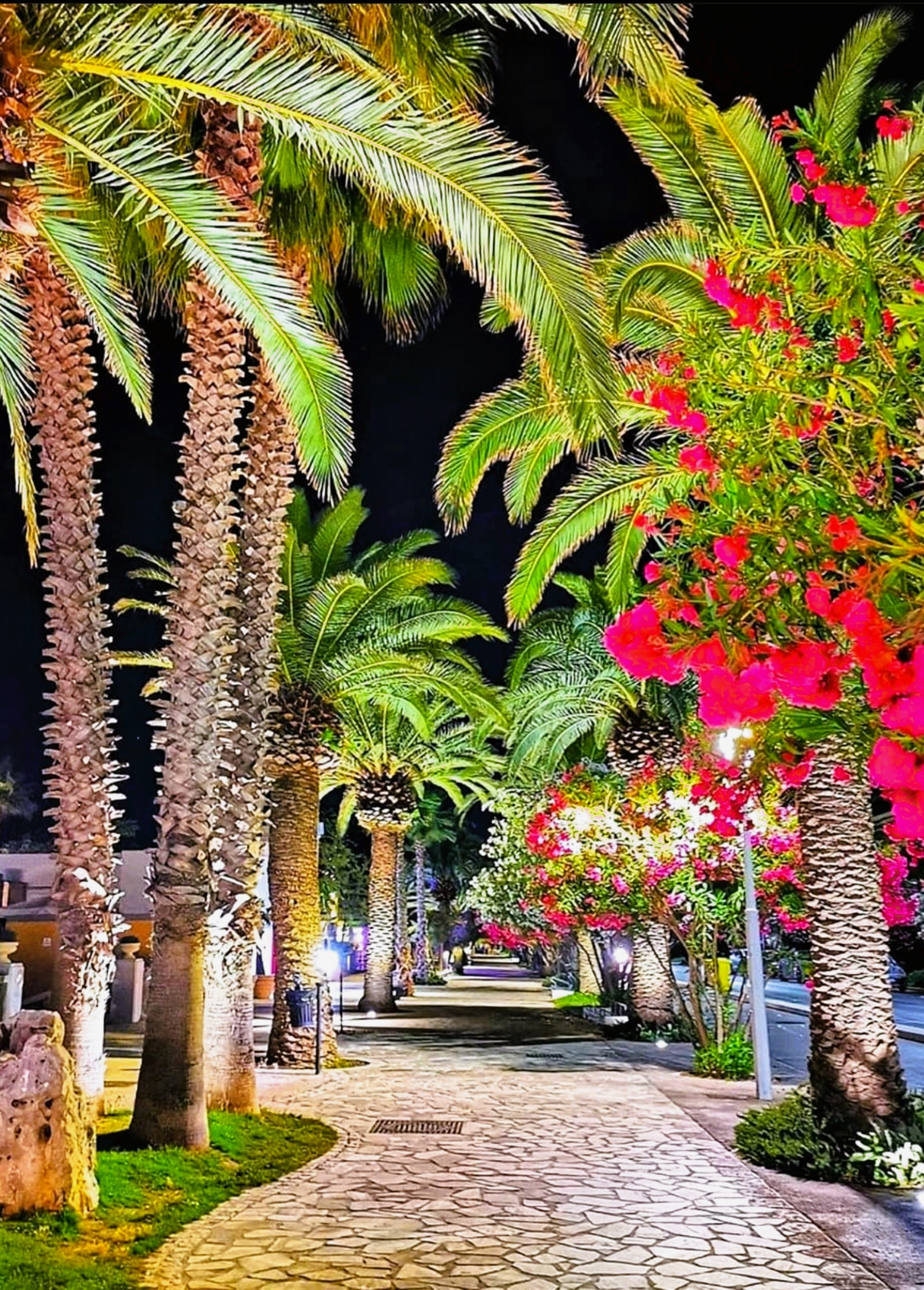
- northern waterfront of San Benedetto del Tronto.
- Length: 3.1 mi (5.0 km)
- South end: Salvo D'Acquisto square, San Benedetto del Tronto
- North end: Carlo Giorgini square, San Benedetto del Tronto

Construction
- Inauguration: 1932; 94 years ago

The San Benedetto del Tronto Waterfront (Italian Lungomare di San Benedetto del Tronto), is a long tree-lined avenue of San Benedetto del Tronto, Italy, Europe. It is equipped with roadway for motor vehicle, cycle and pedestrian paths, sculpture's, fitness equipment and views of the Adriatic Sea. A peculiar characteristic is the abundant presence of thousands of palm trees, mainly of the P.canariensis, Washingtonia and P. sylvestris.

== History ==
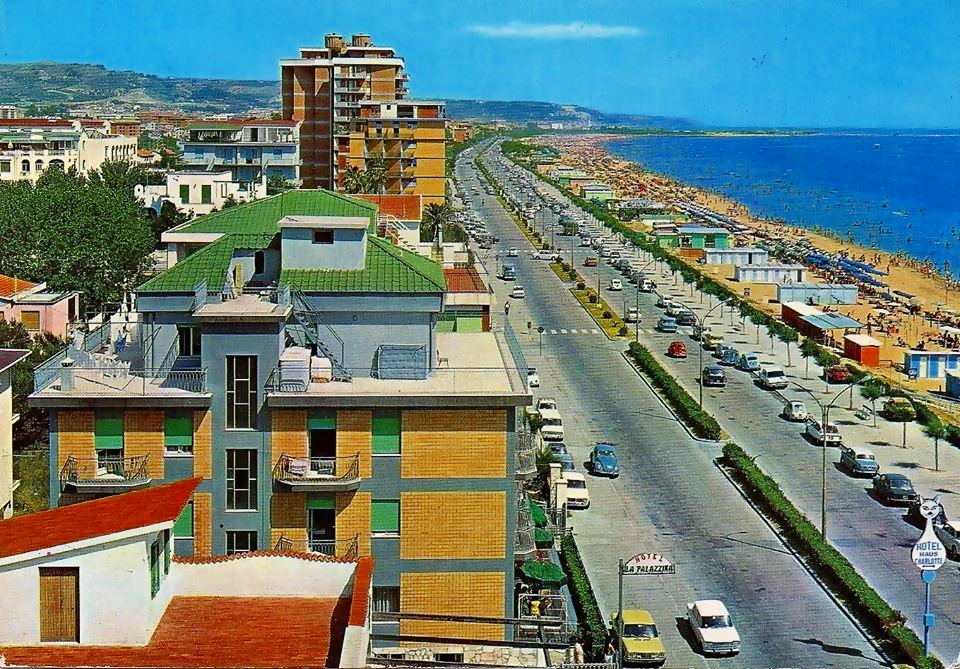
Weafront in the 70s

In 1865 was one of the first seaside resorts on the Adriatic to open a bathing establishment, the Bagni establishment. The Autonomous Tourist Board of San Benedetto del Tronto commissioned the Modena engineer Luigi Onorati to design a road along the beach, to improve the tourist offering of the town. Designed at the beginning of the 1930s by the engineer Luigi Onorati, the first stretch of the "Christopher Columbus waterfront" (the current Bruno Buozzi Avenue), was inaugurated on 30 July 1932. During the World War II the city was hit by heavy bombings in 1943 and 1944, the seafront was particularly damaged and was rebuilt only at the end of the war operations. From the 1950s onwards the waterfront was improved year after year, until it became the city's main attraction. Since 1967 the finish line of the Tirreno–Adriatico stage cycling race has been located on the waterfront. In the 2000s the seafront underwent a major renovation.

== Description ==
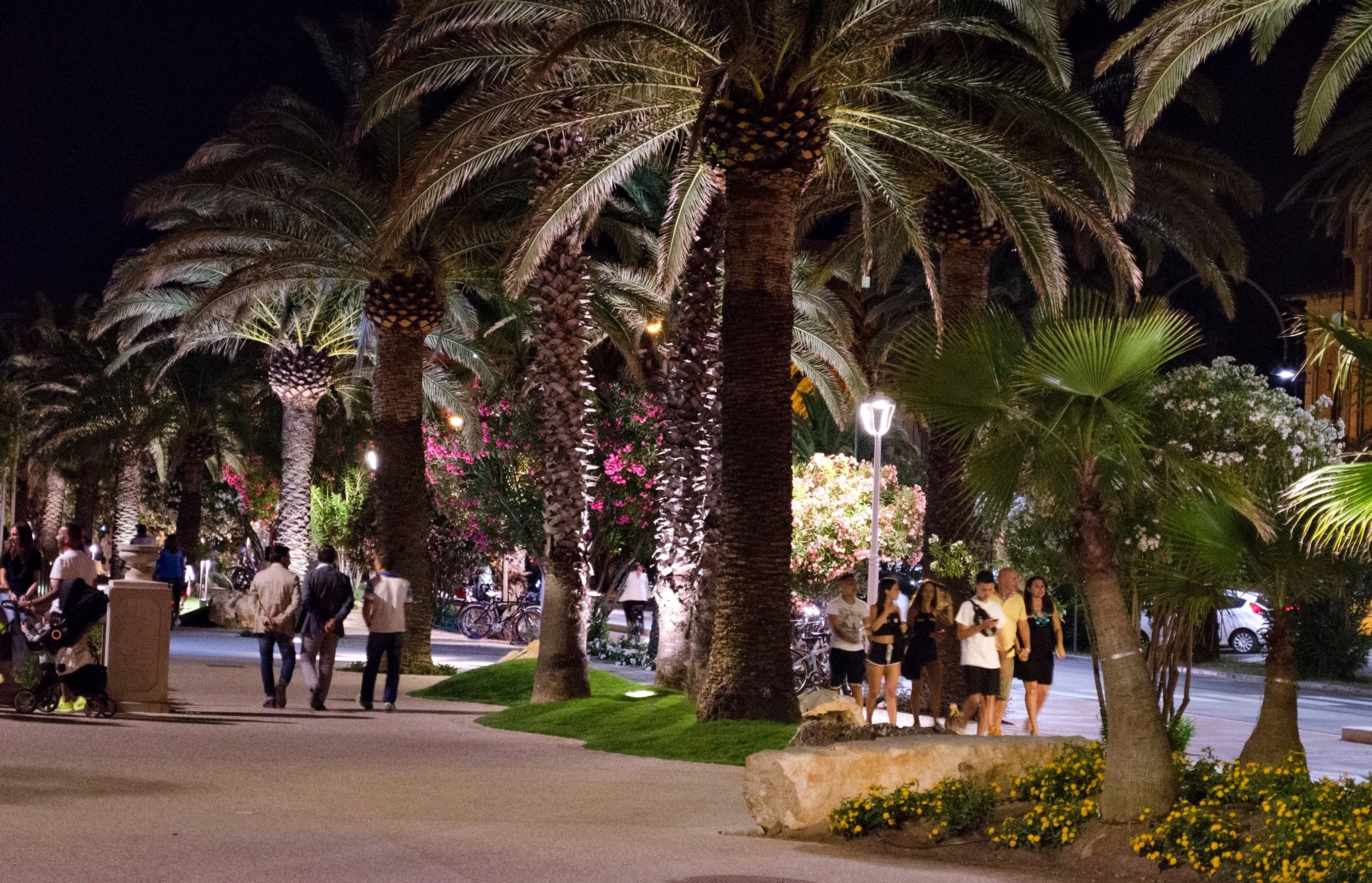
Pedestrian stretch

The waterfront was built which, even today, in addition to being an essential communication route, constitutes the center of San Benedetto. Considered disproportionate at the time of construction, it was It has a roadway with a total width of 30 meters and begins from the Giorgini roundabout (the roundabout), at the end of the central Viale Moretti, and, in its northernmost part, due to the retreat of the sea resulting from the continuous enlargement of the port, it is very far back compared to the sea shore. It ends at the Salvo D'Acquisto roundabout for a total length of approximately 5 km.

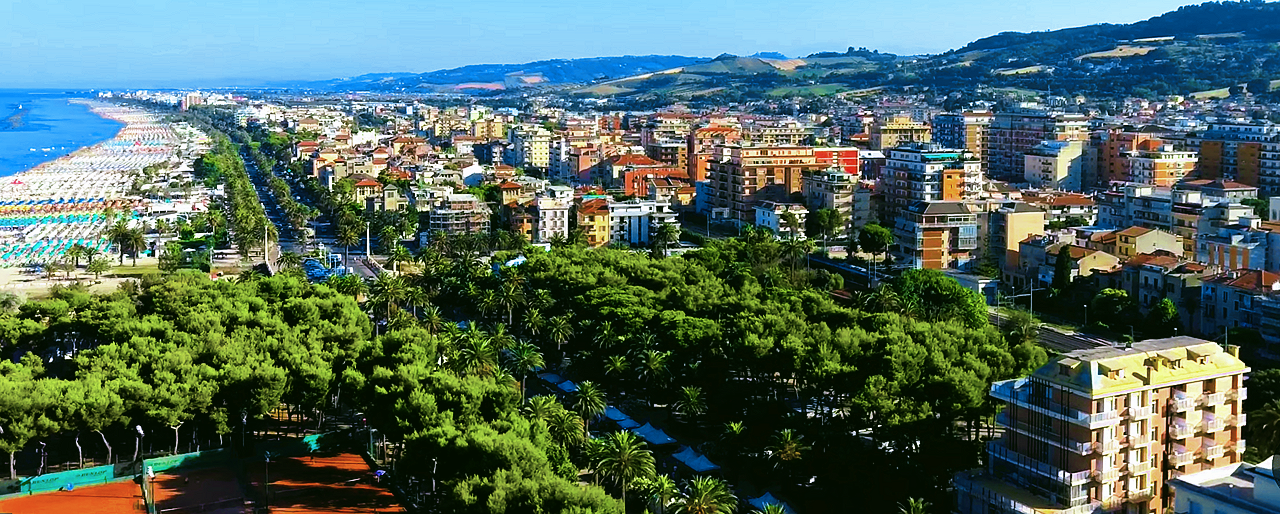
Panoramic view of the waterfront

It is bordered by lush gardens, a pine forest, tennis courts, a skating rink and a building, the "Palazzina Azzurra", the city's local historian, on the mouth of the Albula stream that determines the end of the first stretch, to the south of which the most touristy area, with beachside resorts on one side and villas and hotels on the other side of the road. A peculiar feature of the waterfront is the abundant presence of palm trees (mainly Phoenix canariensis and Phoenix sylvestris) which have become a bit of a city symbol (today, between public and private gardens and along the city avenues, there are a total of about 8,000 palm trees of various species) in the tourist sense, having taken the same tourist promotion company the name of Riviera delle Palme. The initial stretch of the seafront was and is characterised by the presence of dozens of Liberty style villa's.

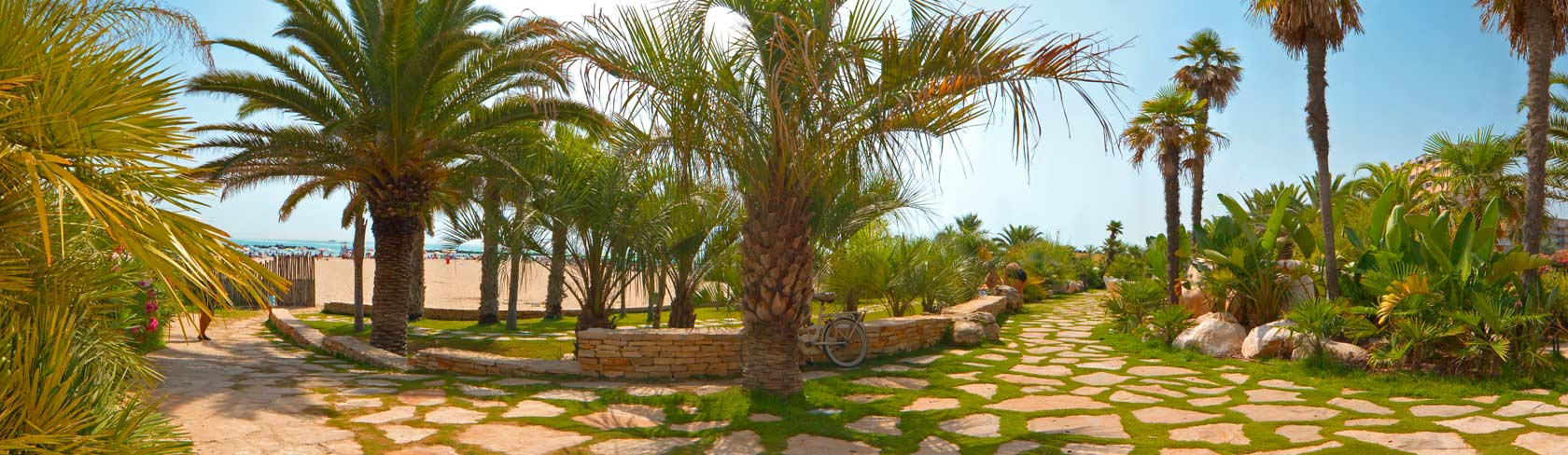
Promenade of San Benedetto del Tronto

In 2001 the cycle path was completed which is a single walk to Cupra Marittima to the north and to Porto d'Ascoli to the south. The southern part of the waterfront has been subject to interventions at different times. In 2004, designed by architect Farnush Davarpanah, a radical reconstruction was launched which saw the modernization of the first part of the southern promenade: both the pedestrian area and the cycle path were extended. Then in 2007 the 2nd section was inaugurated.

== University ==
Located inside the former Gil, on Scipioni waterfront, since 2009 the "UNICAM-Biologia della Nutrizione" has been active, a branch of the Faculty of Science and Technology of the University of Camerino, which offers three-year degree courses in Biology and Biology of Nutrition.

== Attractions ==
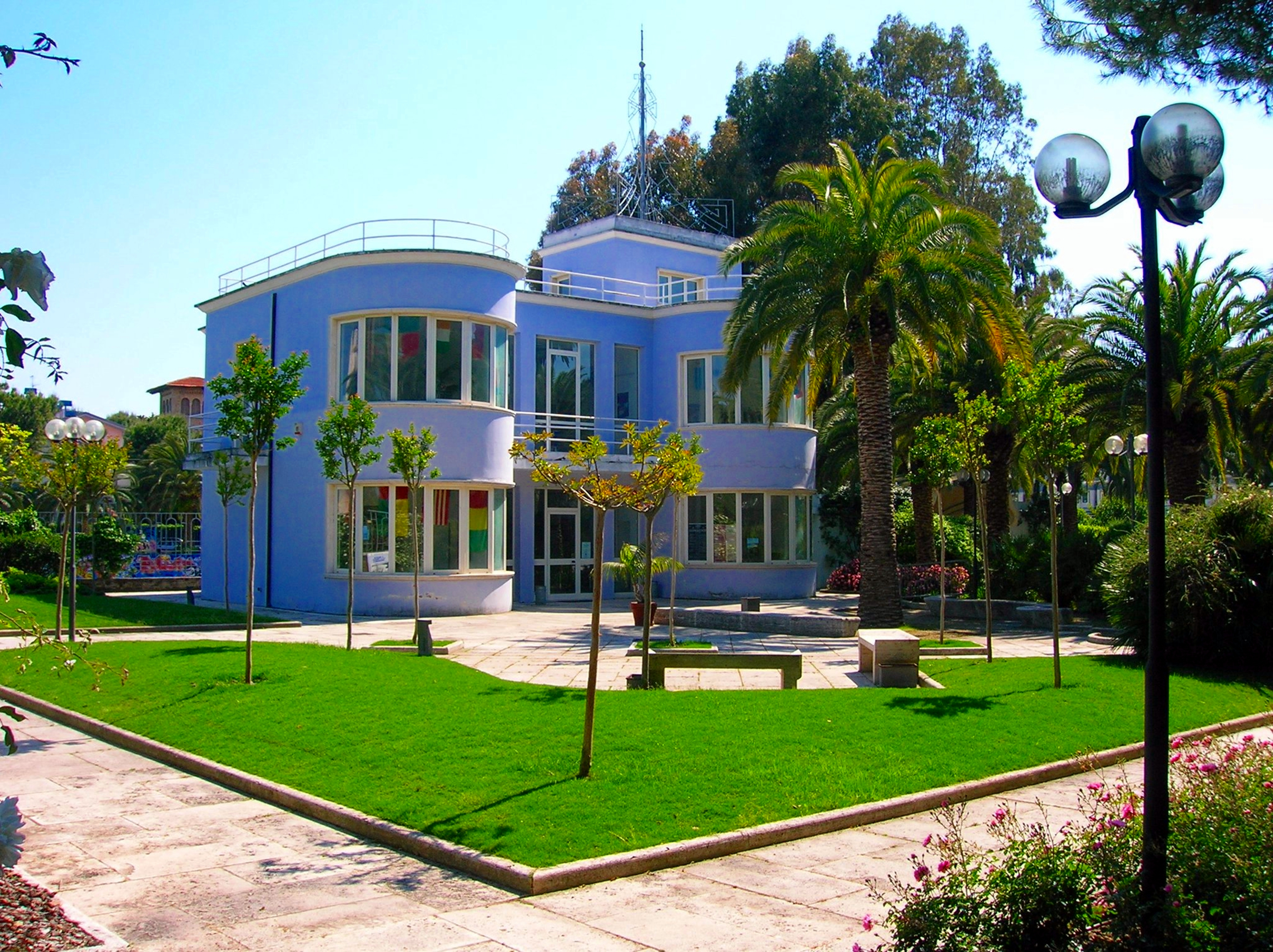
The "Palazzina Azzurra"

The attractions of the waterfront are various, including :

- The Palazzina Azzurra, was inaugurated on 1 September 1934. In a purely rationalistic style, it was built next to the two tennis courts and the "Circolo Forestieri". In the garden of Palazzina Azzurra, once an elegant rendezvous, and today the venue of cultural events, stands "Vale & Tino", a sculpture by Marco Lodola, made of coloured neon, inaugurated on Valentine's Day, 2008

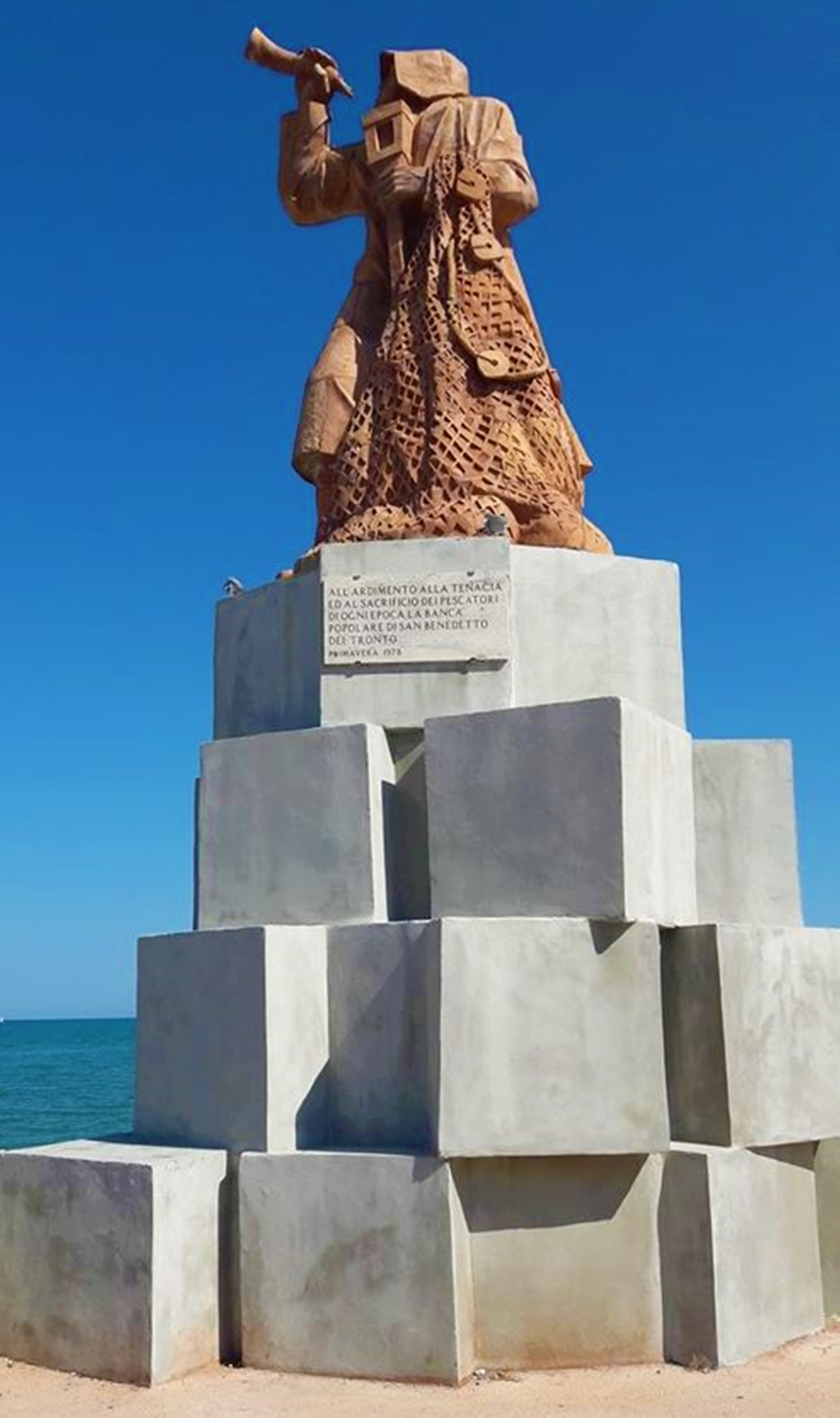
Fisherman monument

- Monument to the fisherman, by the artist Cleto Capponi, standing on a terrace overlooking the sea. This work of art, celebrating the courage, strength and sacrifice of fisher men of every age, was financed by a local bank, and unveiled in Spring 1978. If you keep walking north along the seafront from this monument, you reach the south quay; a stroll to the end of it feels like actually walking into the open sea, while enjoying the beautiful and interesting sculptures of the "MAM - Art Museum on the Sea".
- Nespolo monument, it is a monument created by Ugo Nespolo, the monument "Lavorare, lavorare, lavorare, preferisco il rumore del mare" ("Work, work, work, I prefer the sound of the sea"), was unveiled at the beginning of the seafront promenade. It was the first work of contemporary art in the city. Made of coloured steel, over seven metres high, it illustrates its title and has a deep meaning. The sculptor, in fact, was inspired by a famous poem by Dino Campana:

Work ennobles Man, but when it becomes work, work and more work it ends up crushing him. And it is not a question of need, but of greed, envy, eagerness, false necessities causing him to neglect the best gifts freely given to him. Therefore the sea means everything big and generous surrounding him and inviting everybody not to forget the gifts God donates them every moment.

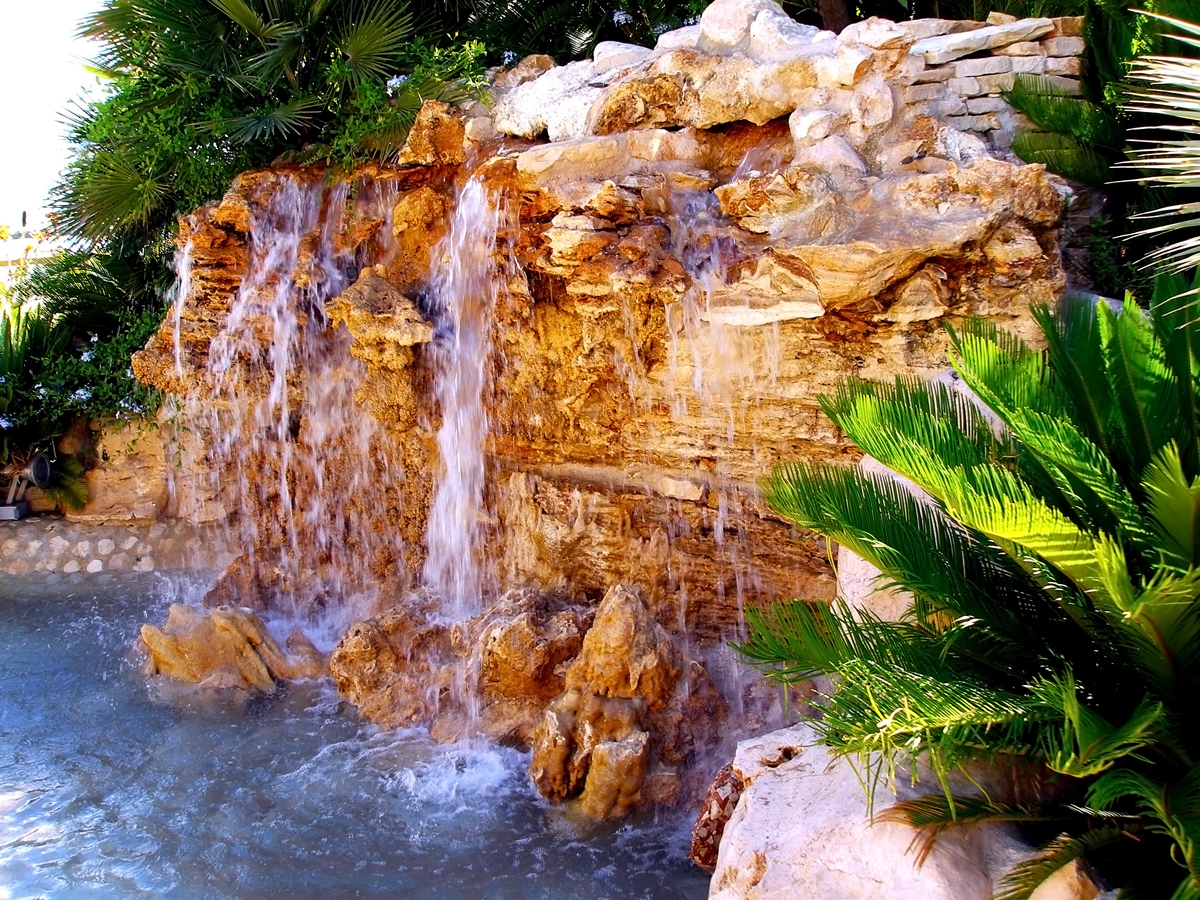
The artificial waterfall

- Monument to Salvo d'Acquisto, located on the southern waterfront, is an 8.5-meter-high bronze sculpture. The city's tribute to Salvo D'Acquisto who was a member of the Italian Carabinieri during the Second World War.

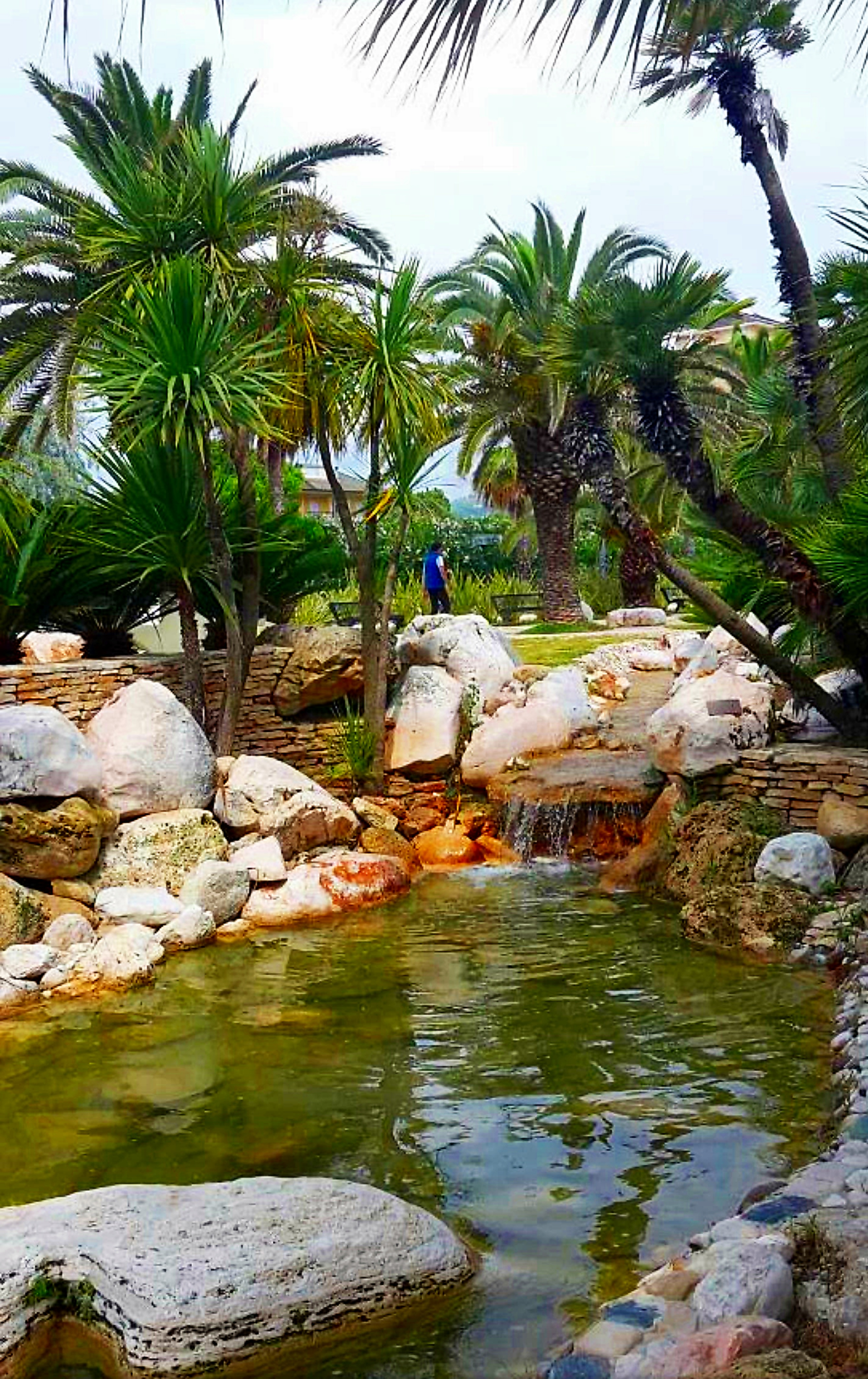
The "Palms garden"

The gardens of the natural park:

- Snoezelen garden,
- Country garden,
- Child's garden,
- Health garden,
- Citrus garden,
- Mediterranean garden,
- palms garden,
- Succulent plant garden,
- Humidity garden,
- Rose's garden.

The peculiarity of these gardens is the multitude of botanical species, there are more than 1000 species of Plants and flowers.

- “Nuttate de lune” (Moonlit night) Park, is an urban park located at the beginning of the northern promenade, at the mouth of the Albula stream. “Nuttate de lune” is the title of a song in the San Benedetto dialect, dedicated to fishermen and the local navy, written in the 1930s.

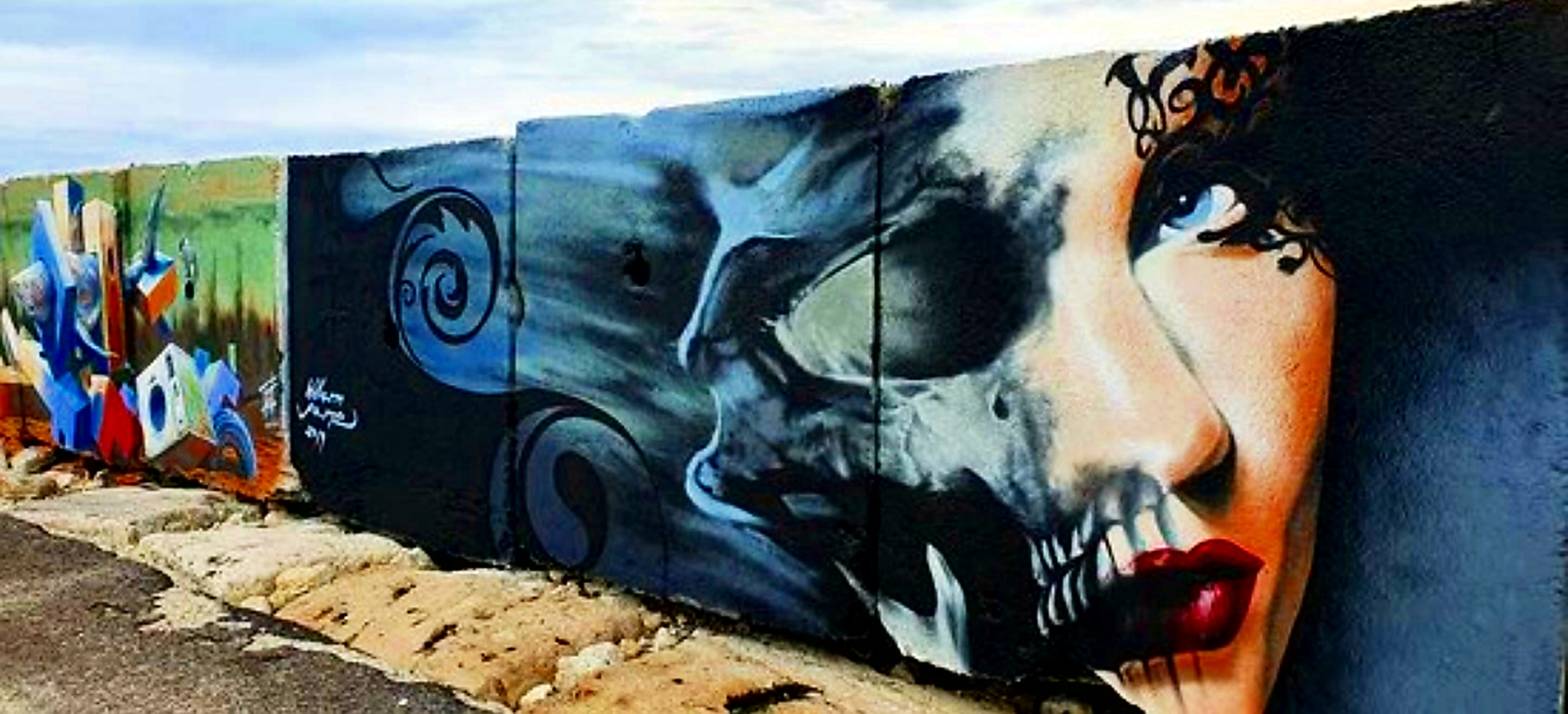
Mural "Impermanenza" by William Kaine (Italy)

- Art Museum on the Sea, within the port area and the waterfront. It contains 230 works of which 200 are sculpture's created on the faces of the travertine breakwater blocks aligned along the promenade in the first section of the pier and 30 are mural's created in the third section, on the faces of the concrete blocks. The works have been created since 1996, by 200 artists from 40 nations on 5 continents.

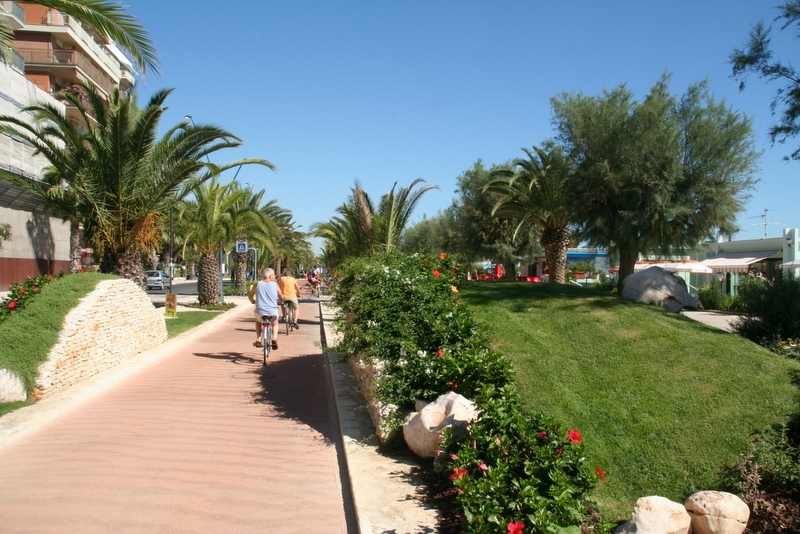
Section of the cycle path

- Cycle path, runs along the entire seafront from Piazza Salvo d'Acquisto to the south to the port pier to the north for about 3,7 mile. The cycle path is part of the larger project called Ciclovia Adriatica which once completed will connect the entire Adriatic coast.
- Fitness areas, located in the garden of the Albula stream and the first beach concession, in June 2020 an equipped area was dedicated, available free of charge, for the calisthenics sport discipline. In 2024 it was expanded with the addition of new equipment. The Falcone - Borsellino pine forest, a large green area full of trees of the pinus brutia species, equipped for various sports disciplines. The "San Beach Arena", built by the Municipality of San Benedetto del Tronto, located a few meters from the Marconi seafront, in the former "Rodi" field, is a sports complex used for sand sports; the scene of national and international sporting events and demonstrations in the summer. Various sporting activities take place here, from Beach soccer to Footvolley. The San Beach Arena can accommodate approximately 1.000 seats for the public and spectators.

== See also ==
- San Benedetto del Tronto
- Riviera of the Palms
