= Volvarina tessae =

Scientific classification
- Kingdom: Animalia
- Phylum: Mollusca
- Class: Gastropoda
- Subclass: Caenogastropoda
- Order: Neogastropoda
- Family: Marginellidae
- Genus: Volvarina
- Species: V. tessae

Binomial name
- Volvarina tessae Cossignani, 2007

Species of gastropod

Volvarina tessae is a species of sea snail, a marine gastropod mollusk in the family Marginellidae, the margin snails. It was first described by Italian malacologist Tommaso Cossignani in Malacologia No. 54, published in February 2007. The species was discovered off the coast of Santos, São Paulo State, Brazil. The holotype, measuring 7.59 mm in length, is preserved at the Museo Malacologico Piceno in Cupra Marittima, Italy.

== Description ==
The shell of Volvarina tessae is small, slender, and smooth, reaching an estimated length of around 10 mm. The holotype, measuring 7.59 mm, exemplifies the species' glossy, elongated, and ovate shape, characteristic of the margin snails.

== Distribution ==
This marine species occurs off Brazil
