= Clébson =

Clébson may refer to:

- Clébson (footballer, born 1978) (1978–2001), Brazilian defender
- Clébson (footballer, born 1985) (born 1985), Brazilian midfielder
- Clebson (footballer, born 1999) (born 1999), Brazilian midfielder
