= Plestia (disambiguation) =

Plestia may refer to:

- Plestia, a genus of planthoppers
- Plestia, the Roman-era name for the Italian village of Colfiorito
  - The Bishopric of Plestia
- Plestia Alaqad (born 2001), Palestinian journalist
