= Cupra (goddess) =

Pre-Roman goddess

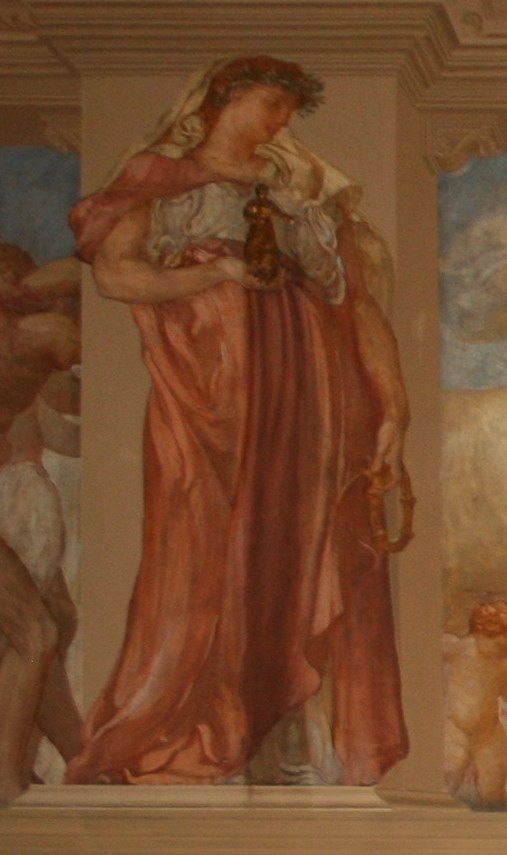

Cupra was a goddess of the ancient pre-Roman population of the Piceni and the Umbri.

Dedications to her have been found at Plestia (attested as matres ple(s)tinas) and Ripatransone, and in Cupramontana and Cupra Marittima, which are named after her.

== Etymology ==
The Umbrian adjective cupras and the South Picene adverb kuprí perhaps reflect a Proto-Italic adjective *kupros, which itself possibly connects to the Latin verb cupiō ('to desire, to want"). Structurally, the name Cupra is perhaps comparable to the name of the Oscan goddess herentateis, whose name derives from the semantically similar root *gʰer- ("to enjoy"). The name has also been connected to the Ancient Greek word Κύπρις ("Kúpris") and the Sabine term ciprum. Etymologically, her name may suggest a connection with the Greek goddess Aphrodite.

== Mythology ==
Worship of Cupra is well-attested throughout Picenum and the broader Apennine region. The 1st-century CE Roman poet Silius Italicus mentions other "altars of Cupra" that "smoke by the shore." Another ancient author, the 1st-century BCE Greek geographer Strabo, equates the Greek goddess Hera with Cupra, who was—according to Strabo—worshipped at a temple in Picene territory, which he claims was constructed by the Etruscan people. In Umbrian inscriptions, the deity is named "Mother Cupra," which may parallel the role of Hera as a goddess of family and a protector of women, perhaps justifying the syncretism of the two divinities. Another inscription, dated to the time of the Roman Empire, names a "Mars Cyprius," the epithet of whom is perhaps to be connected with the goddess Cupra. Alternatively, the epithet may instead reflect a growing association between Venus and Mars, as perhaps demonstrated by inscription that mentions a "Venus Martialis." However, women in Picene society were included within princely or warrior burials, implying that Picene gender norms did not preclude women from either the literal role of a warrior or from symbolic characteristics such as courage or nobility which are sometimes associated with warriors. Thus, it is possible that a goddess such as Cupra in Picene culture possessed a role more comparable to that of Minerva than Venus. According to this interpretation, the equation of the goddess with Hera found in the writings of Strabo may merely indicate that Cupra was prominent and propitiated by women.

Her worship is primarily concentrated at locations associated with trade and communication, the same routes through which her cult likely spread. However, there is possibly one mountaintop sanctuary of the goddess, which may violate the typical relation between her cult places and spaces connected to travel. In the modern town of Cupramontana, there exists—near a later church by the Piazza IV Novembre—the remains of a 3rd-1st century BCE Hellenistic temple constructed atop a mountain. The 1st-century CE Roman author Pliny the Elder mentions a town with the name Montana whose population is designated as the Cuprenses, which perhaps connects to the modern town of Cupramontana. The same term Cuprenses was discovered on an inscription near Cupra Marittima, a site with a sanctuary dedicated to the goddess, which may indicate that Cupramontana likewise possessed a temple to Cupra. If such a sanctuary site existed, it is—according to the archaeologist Eleanor Betts—probably to be identified with the ancient temple known from archaeology. Although the site is distinct from other potential temples of Cupra—in that it is not connected to a nearby water-source by a frequently-used pathway—Betts suggests that the area is not incongruous with the general characterization of Cupra as a goddess associated with communication. Betts proposes that the elevation of the site rendered it visible to any individual traveling eastward from Sentino or westward from Ancona, thereby allowing the temple to symbolically protect trade and travelers.

In 1960s, archaeologists uncovered a set of four bronze plates in Colfiorito containing an Umbrian inscription mentioning Cupra. It is possible that a sanctuary to the goddess existed near this town, probably by a lake near the modern church of S. Maria di Pistia. Though the lake has since dried, it is evidenced by geological features of the landscape, and it is also probably to be identified with the lacus Plestinus mentioned in Roman sources. According to Betts, it is likely that the cult of Cupra was brought into Colfiorito by Picene merchants and traders, whose activity at the site is further attested by the concurrent increases in the wealth of settlement, which likely occurred as a result of increased economic activity and trade with the Piceni. Betts further suggests that, besides overseeing commerce and communication, Cupra was perhaps connected in some manner to sacred water, as—according to Betts—the spring near her temple would likely have served as an important supply of water for the local community. Another Umbrian language inscription mentioning Cupra, which is generally dated to the 2nd-century BCE, was uncovered in a hollowed-out rock at the site of Fossato di Vico. The inscription dedicated a cistern to the goddess, perhaps further supporting the possible connection between the divinity and the water supply. Worship of Cupra beside lakes perhaps served as the impetus for her later equation with Feronia, a goddess who later usurped the temple of Cupra at Colfiorito and was also associated with water.

Excavations at Cupra Marittima revealed a 40-centimetre (16 in) wide and 8-metre (26 ft) long votive pit cut into bedrock, with a maximum depth of 20 centimetres (7.9 in). The arrangement of the artifacts within this pit may indicate that the area was once filled with water, which itself perhaps derived from the spring of the Fosso di Sant’Andrea. This pit contained one thousand artifacts, including incense burners, miniature ovens, spoons, ladles, ornaments such as beads or pendants, and several unidentified items, some of which may consist of miniature boundary cippi. Additionally, there were also miniaturized versions of vessels such as jars, two-handled cups, and biconical vases, all of which imitate types of containers used to store liquid. These miniature vessels are stylistically similar to other Italian pottery that is itself dated to between the 6th and 5th centuries BCE, perhaps implying a similar date for the votive pit. Moreover, there are other parallel examples of close proximity between miniature vessels and springs throughout in Picenum and caves in Abruzzo and Emilia-Romagna. Evidence from other Italian cult places may attest to a perceived connection between death and springs, a notion perhaps reflected at Marittima, as the vessels at this site are typologically similar to items discovered in tombs at Marittima and other areas such as Ripatransone and Grottammare. These vessels may indicate that the site, and therefore perhaps Cupra herself, were connected to rituals associated with purification and the transition into the afterlife. However, according to the Betts, the connection between this site and Cupra is uncertain, as it rests largely upon the existence of later sanctuary sites at Marittima dedicated to the goddess.
