= Clébson (footballer, born 1978) =

Brazilian footballer

Personal information
- Full name: Clébson Moreira dos Santos
- Date of birth: 4 September 1978
- Place of birth: Itiúba, Brazil
- Date of death: 22 June 2001 (aged 22)
- Place of death: Serrinha, Brazil
- Position: Defender

Senior career*
Years	Team	Apps	(Gls)
1997–1999	Bahia		
2000–2001	Vasco da Gama	55	(3)
- * Club domestic league appearances and goals as of 2 October 2023

Clébson Moreira dos Santos (4 September 1978 – 22 June 2001), simply known as Clébson, was a Brazilian professional footballer who played as a defender.

== Career ==
He began his career in 1997, at EC Bahia, and in 1998 he was Bahia champion with the club, attracting the attention of several clubs. Hired by Vasco, for its versatility, as he played both as a defender and as a full-back, he joined the squad as an option, but won the position of Maricá, and made a total of 55 appearances for the club. Clébson also scored two goals for the club, both in the 2001 Copa Libertadores.

== Death ==
Clébson died after his car collided with the back of a truck, while he was traveling from Salvador to his hometown, Itiúba.

== Honours ==
Bahia

- Campeonato Baiano: 1999

Vasco da Gama

- Copa João Havelange: 2000
- Copa Mercosur: 2000
- Taça Rio: 2001

== See also ==
- List of association football players who died during their careers
