= Grottammare =

- Comune
- Città di Grottammare
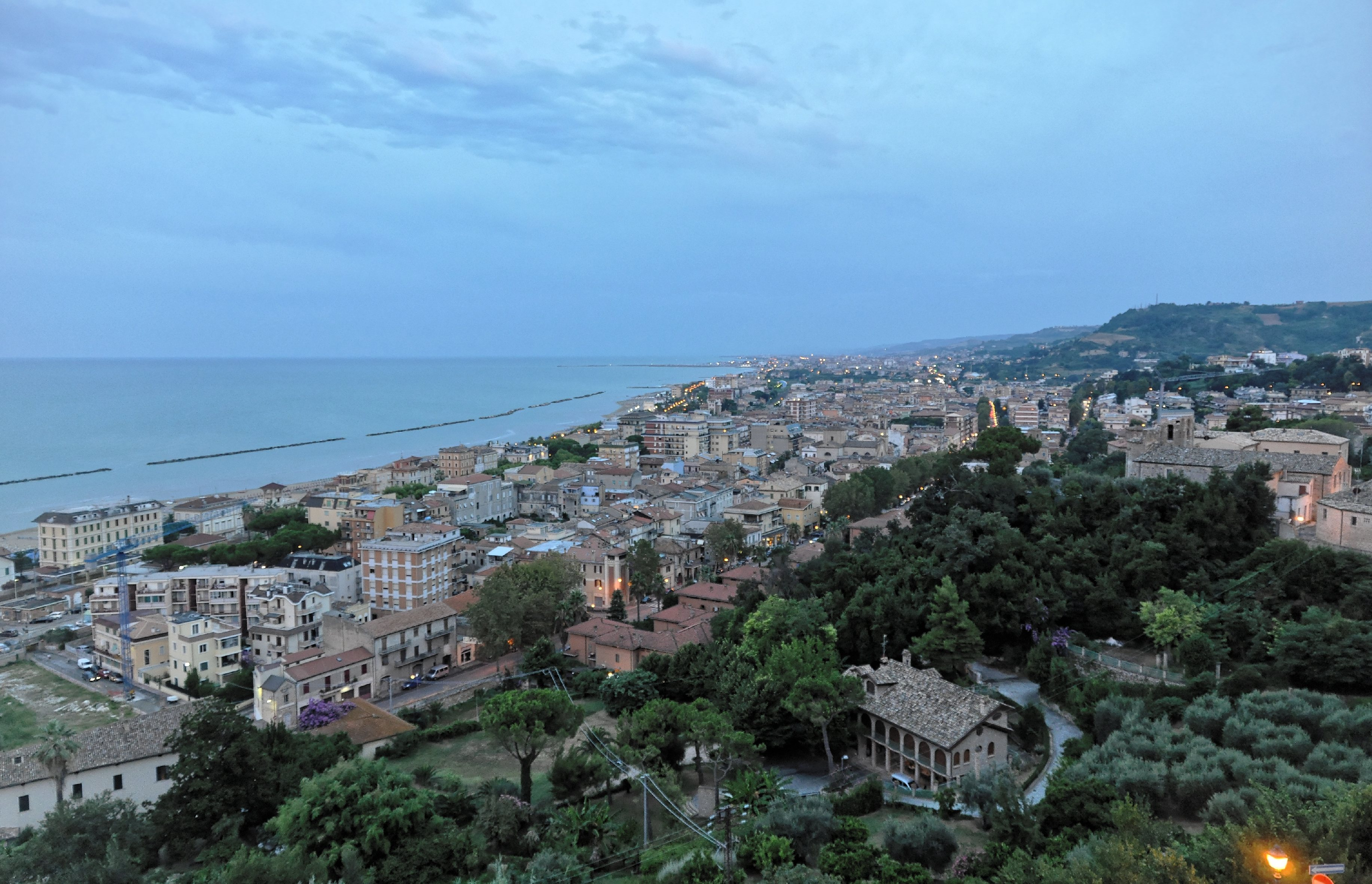
- View from the old town

- Coat of arms

- Location within Italy Location within Marche
- Coordinates: 42°59′23″N 13°51′57″E
- Country: Italy
- Region: Marche
- Province: Ascoli Piceno (AP)
- Frazioni: Ischia

Government
  - Mayor: Alessandro Rocchi (since May 2023)

Area
  - Total: 17.66 km^{2} (6.82 sq mi)
- Elevation: 4 m (13 ft)

Population (31 October 2017)
  - Total: 16,130
  - Density: 913.4/km^{2} (2,366/sq mi)
- Demonym: Grottammaresi
- Time zone: UTC+1 (CET)
  - Summer (DST): UTC+2 (CEST)
- Postal code: 63066
- Dialing code: 0735
- Patron saint: Saint Paternian
- Saint day: 10 July
- Website: Official website

Grottammare (Teramano Neapolitan: Le Grottë) is a town and comune on Italy's Adriatic coast, in the province of Ascoli Piceno, Marche region. It is one of I Borghi più belli d'Italia ("The most beautiful villages of Italy").

The town is crossed by the 43rd parallel north. Economy is mostly based on summer tourism; other sectors include food and vegetables production, mechanics, and commerce.

== Notable people ==
- Pope Sixtus V (1521–1590), born here
- Pericle Fazzini (1913–1987), artist, created the bronze sculpture La Resurrezione at Paul VI Audience Hall in Vatican City

== Sister towns ==
- Naples, Italy
- Sal, Cape Verde
- Gjirokastër, Albania
- Itiúba, Brazil
- Sant'Agata de' Goti, Italy

== See also ==
- Riviera delle Palme (Marche)
