= Colfiorito =

- Frazione
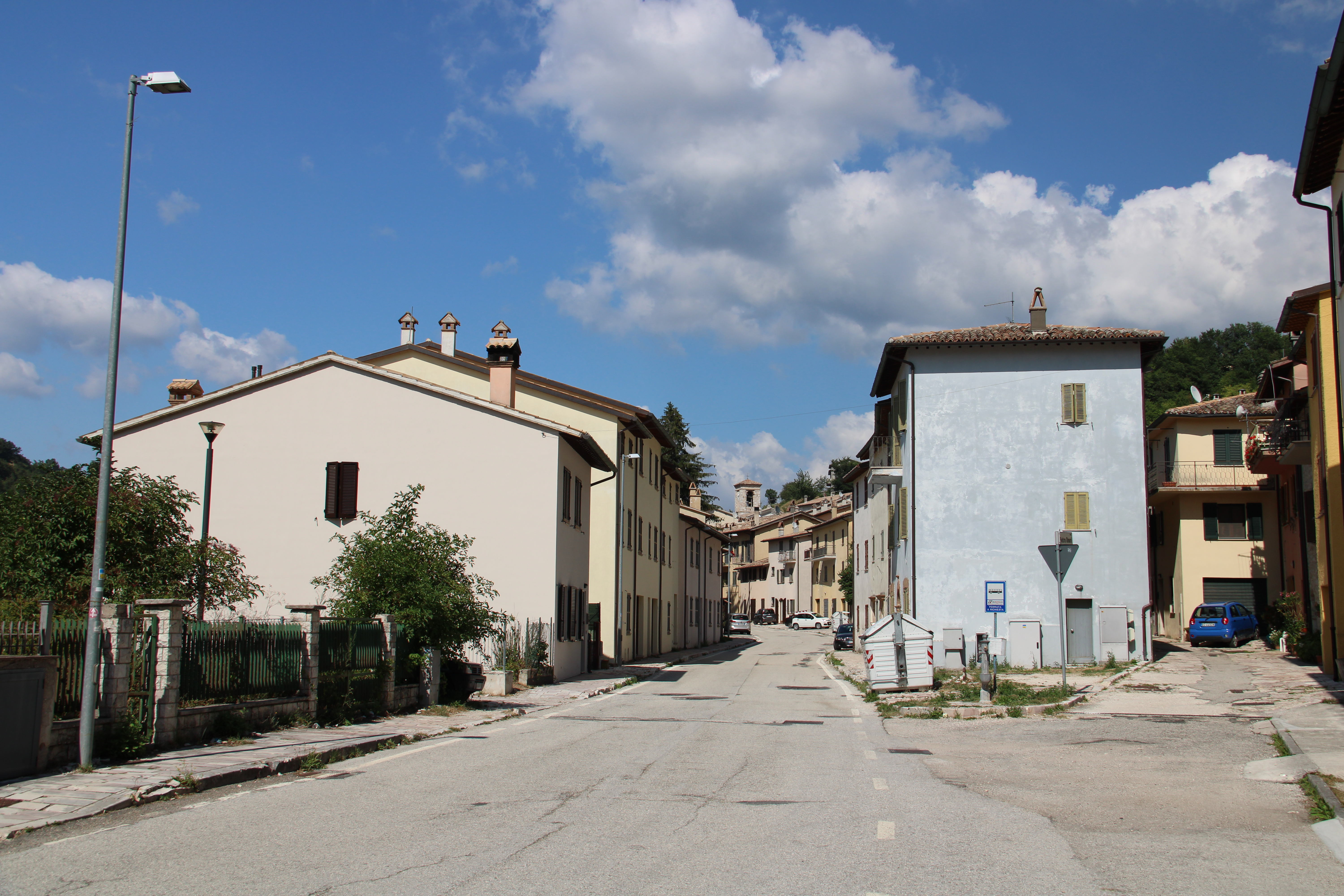
- Colfiorito

- Location of Colfiorito in Italy
- Coordinates: 43°01′35″N 12°53′24″E
- Country: Italy
- Region: Umbria
- Province: Perugia
- Comune: Foligno
- Elevation: 760 m (2,490 ft)

Population (2021)
  - Total: 459
- Time zone: UTC+1 (CET)
  - Summer (DST): UTC+2 (CEST)

Colfiorito (Italian: [ˌkɔlfjoˈriːto]; "Flowery Hill") is a village in Umbria, central Italy, now a frazione (borough) of the comune (municipality) of Foligno.

Under its Roman name Plestia, it was the seat of a Roman Catholic bishopric which is currently a titular see. It is known for a variety of lentils grown in its territory.

== History ==
=== Iron Age ===
In the plateau, tombs from the 10th century BC and an Iron Age village (9th century BC) have been found. Several Iron Age huts have been uncovered beneath the remains of the later Roman city. It is likely that these huts were abandoned around the 6th-century BCE, with the population perhaps relocating to the nearby hillforts. Southwest of Plestia, there lies a range of several hillforts, which were perhaps constructed to protect the few entrances to the area, which is otherwise enclosed by mountainous terrain. According to the archaeologist Guy Bradley, these forts may have served to guard the territorial borders of the local community, though it has been alternatively proposed that they were intended to exert control over transhumance routes. The hillforts around Plestia typically consisted of a ditch—usually around 4–5 meters wide—encircling stone fortifications. Cemeteries have been uncovered near these structures, implying that they served as long-term residences rather than temporary spaces of occupation. The general wealth of the grave goods inhumed at any such cemetery appears to correspond to the prominence of the neighboring hillfort: Monte di Franca and Monte di Trella, two less significant forts by Plestia, had less ostentatious burials than those of Monte Orve, which may have serves as the most important hillfort in the vicinity.

The material from the necropolis at Colfiorito has been organized into four separate chronological phases. The first phase encompasses the period from 9th to the 7th centuries BCE, during which time the graves incorporated only relatively basic furnishings, such as a fibula or other such articles of clothing or an impasto vessel. During the second phase, which lasted throughout the 7th-century BCE, grave goods became more lavish and now could consist of items such as iron weapons and bronze dishes. The rising wealth of the funerary rites persisted into the third period, which dates from the 6th-century BCE to the first half of the 4th-century BCE. At this time, tombs began to incorporate significant quantities of Picene goods, including red and black figure vessels imported from Greece, impasto pottery, bronze dining equipment, silver rings, fibulae, and necklaces of amber or ivory. The most lavish burials goods were concentrated in a select few graves, perhaps attesting to a type of local aristocracy and therefore social stratification. The quantity of burials within the cemeteries increased also increased during this period, perhaps reflecting population growth.

Furthermore, the increases in wealth during the 6th and 5th centuries BCE may attest to economic development, itself possibly indicative of agricultural specialization and greater participation in trade networks. Bronze objects from the third phase, such as oenochoes and basins, may indicate trade connections with the Etruscan city of Volsinii. Moreover, it is possible that the Greek material was imported via Picenum, implying a trade link—and therefore contact—between the two peoples, which may explain the construction of an Iron Age temple to the goddess Cupra. The temple was established near the lacus Plestinus, which is described by ancient Roman sources and was probably located near the modern church of Santa Maria di Pistia, though the lake has since dried. Votive material uncovered near this lake implies the existence of specialized craft production capable of producing such pottery or metalwork, itself probably a reflection of the concurrent increases in social complexity during this period. Amongst the ritual dedications from the site, there is an inscription containing the ethnonym pletinas in the Umbrian language, which may indicate that a shared cultural identity was present during the Iron Age. During the fourth phase at the necropolis, both the number of graves and the expense of the mortuary offerings declined greatly, eventually culminating in the seeming termination of any continued burial at the site during the 3rd-century BCE. According to Bradley, the declining quality of burials may reflect decreased involvement in trade routes.

=== Later history ===
In 178 BC existed here the Roman city of Plestia, which had a forum, a temple and other edifices and shortly was a bishopric.

The town was abandoned in the 10th century: the site is now marked by the church of Santa Maria in Plestia.

The area was repopulated by the comune of Foligno, who built here the castle (1269) from which originated the modern village.

In 1860 Colfiorito had a population of 758 inhabitants. At the time, the lake at Colfiorito had advanced toward the settlement to the point of nearly reaching the road used by the stagecoach, and several ground-floor dwellings had standing water.

Colfiorito was heavily damaged by the earthquake which rocked Umbria and Marche regions on September 26, 1997.

== Ecclesiastical History ==
In the 5th century, AD a Diocese of Plestia was established, which was suppressed in 560, its territory being reassigned to the Diocese of Camerino.

In 950 it was restored as Diocese of Plestia, regaining its territory from the above bishopric of Camerino.

In 1006 it was again suppressed, its territory now being divided between the then dioceses of Spoleto, Foligno and Nocera Umbra.

No residential incumbents are available.

=== Titular see ===
In 1966 it was nominally restored as a Latin Titular bishopric, which has had the following incumbents, all of the lowest (episcopal) rank except the archiepiscopal first one:

- Titular Archbishop Leo Christopher Byrne (1967.07.31 – 1974.10.21)
- Bruno Foresti (1974.12.12 – 1976.04.02) (later Archbishop)
- Bolesław Filipiak (1976.05.01 – 1976.05.24); previously Dean of Sacred Roman Rota (1967.06.26 – 1976.05.01), later created Cardinal-Deacon of S. Giovanni Bosco in Via Tuscolana (1976.05.24 – death 1978.10.14)
- John Nicholas Wurm (1976.06.25 – 1981.09.19)
- Anthony Michael Milone (1981.11.10 – 1987.12.14)
- Thaddeus Joseph Jakubowski (1988.02.16 – 2013.07.14)
- Francisco José Villas-Boas Senra de Faria Coelho (2014.04.17 – 2018.06.26), Auxiliary Bishop of Braga (Portugal)
- Thomas Joseph Neylon (2021.07.06 – incumbent), Auxiliary Bishop of Liverpool

== Geography ==
It is located on a plateau at 760 m over the sea level, on the road from municipal seat Foligno to Macerata.

The village contains Umbria's smallest natural park.

== Economy ==
=== Agriculture ===
The patata rossa di Colfiorito is a red-skinned potato associated with the Piana di Colfiorito and surrounding area. Potatoes were introduced to Umbria in the first half of the 18th century. From 1960 onward, a Dutch potato variety became established in the Piana di Colfiorito, where it found particularly suitable conditions. The patata rossa di Colfiorito is oval-elongated and often irregular in shape, with red skin and pale yellow flesh, and is used for producing gnocchi, panierini, and potatoes cooked in embers. It was granted Protected Geographical Indication status in 1998.

== Religion and culture ==
=== Archeological museum ===
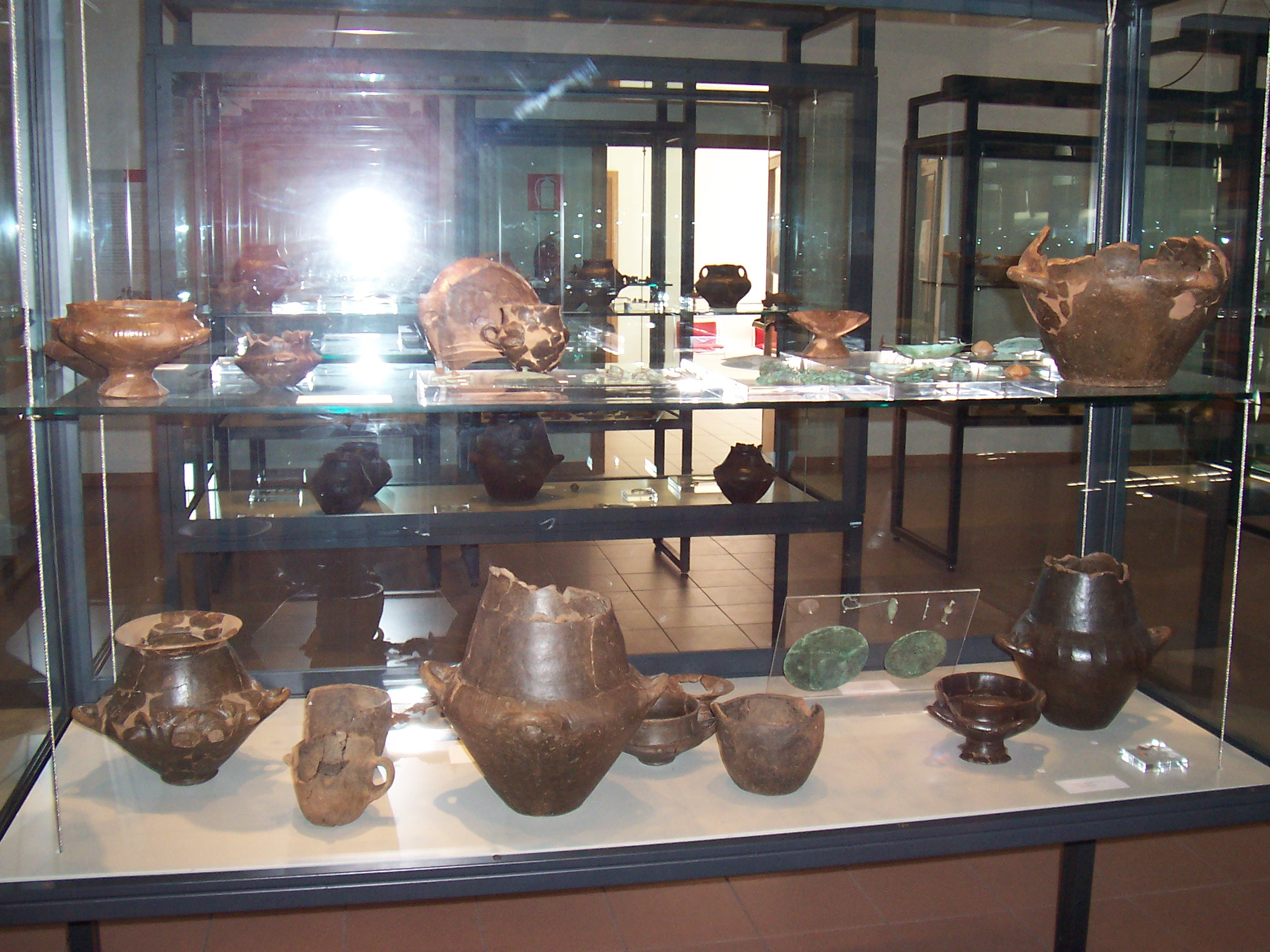
Display case in the museum showing large storage jars, handled pots, small bowls, and pedestal cups

The archeological museum of Colfiorito displays finds largely from excavations carried out from the 1960s in the Colfiorito area. It is dedicated to the Plestini, who are especially attested here in the 7th–5th centuries BC. On the ground floor there is a lapidarium with material from the area of the Roman city and from Plestine territory, including basins, frames, columns, and inscriptions. The first floor is dedicated to the pre-Roman necropolis of Colfiorito, used from the 9th to the 3rd century BC, with grave goods on display and two tombs reconstructed at full scale. The second floor presents settlements and sanctuaries, including the hillfort on Monte Orve and the sanctuary of the goddess Cupra, from which come four bronze plaques with inscriptions identifying the deity as "mother of the Plestini".

=== Other sights ===
- Church of Santa Maria in Plestia (5th century - see description here).
- Castle of Colfiorito.
- Castelliere of Monte Orve.
- Archaeological Museum of the Umbri Plestini

== Notes and references ==
=== Bibliography ===
- Amann, Petra (2024-02-22), "The Umbrians", in Maiuro, Marco (ed.), The Oxford Handbook of Pre-Roman Italy (1000--49 BCE) (1 ed.), Oxford University Press, pp. 368–383, doi:10.1093/oxfordhb/9780199987894.013.23, ISBN 978-0-19-998789-4
- Betts, Eleanor (2013-04-01). "Cubrar matrer: goddess of the Picenes?". Accordia Research Papers.
- Bradley, Guy Jolyon (1997). Umbria from the Iron Age to the Augustan Era (Doctoral thesis). University College London.
- Bradley, Guy Jolyon (2000). "Tribes, states and cities in central Italy". In Herring, Edward; Lomas, Kathryn (eds.). The Emergence of State Identities in Italy in the First Millennium BC. Accordia Specialist Studies on Italy. Vol. 8. Accordia Research Institute. ISBN 978-1-873415-22-1.
- Bradley, Guy Jolyon (2000b). Ancient Umbria: State, culture, and identity in central Italy from the Iron Age to the Augustan era. Oxford University Press. doi:10.1093/oso/9780199245147.001.0001. ISBN 978-0-19-924514-7.
