= Riviera delle Palme (Marche) =

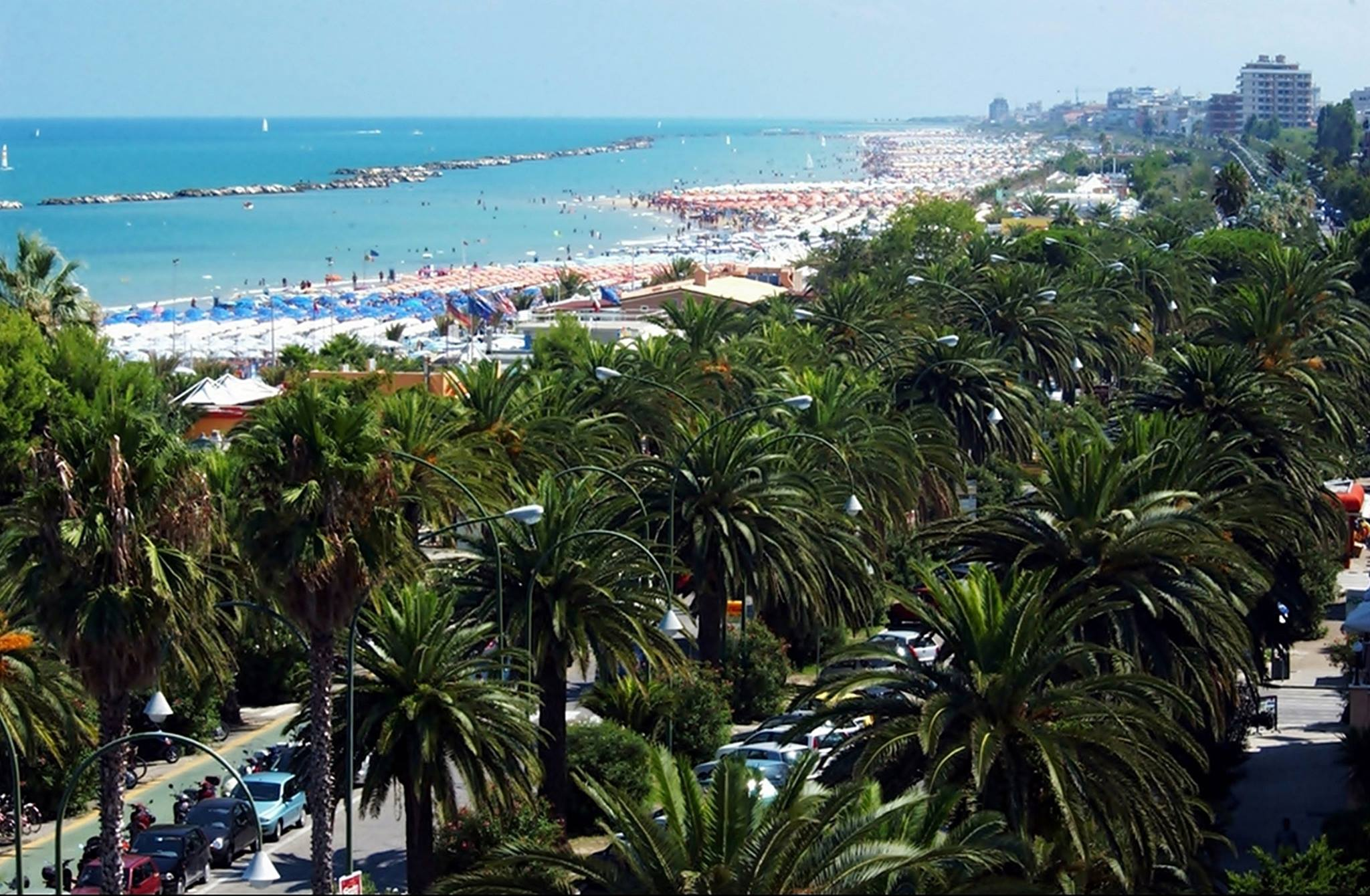
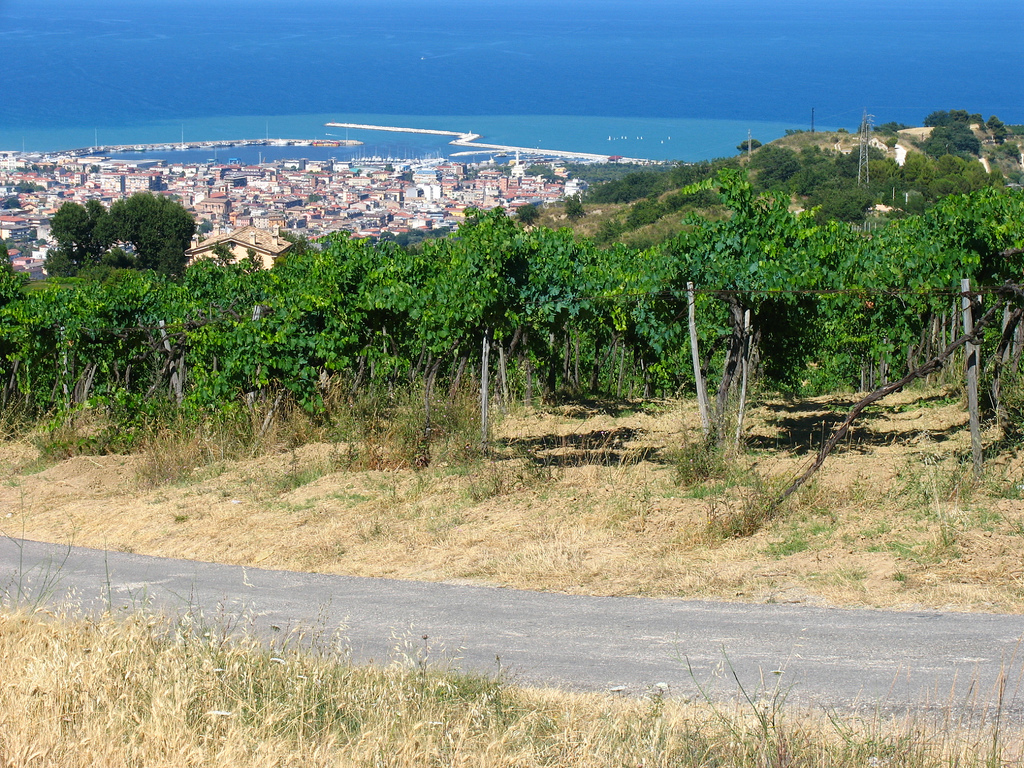
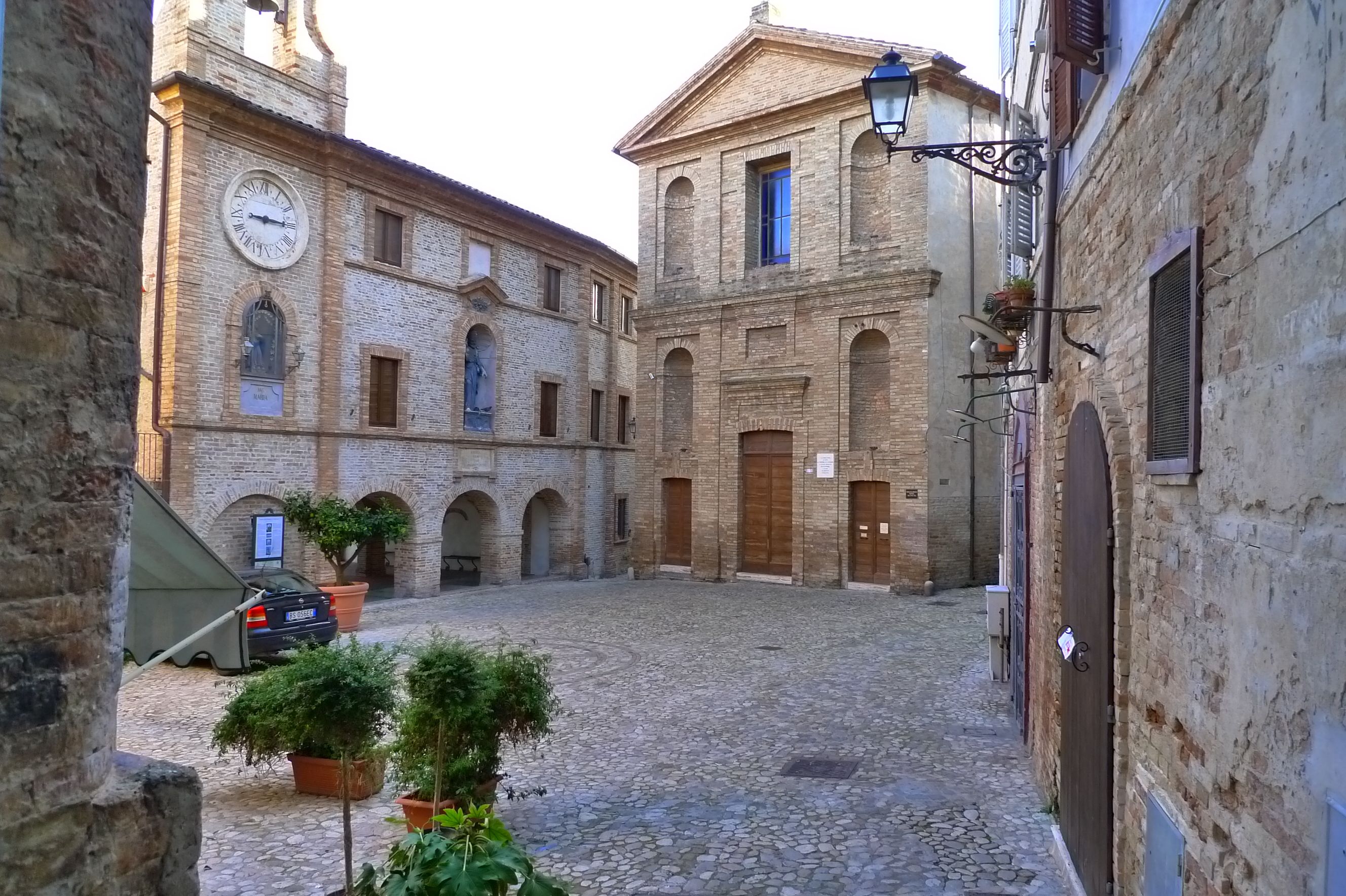
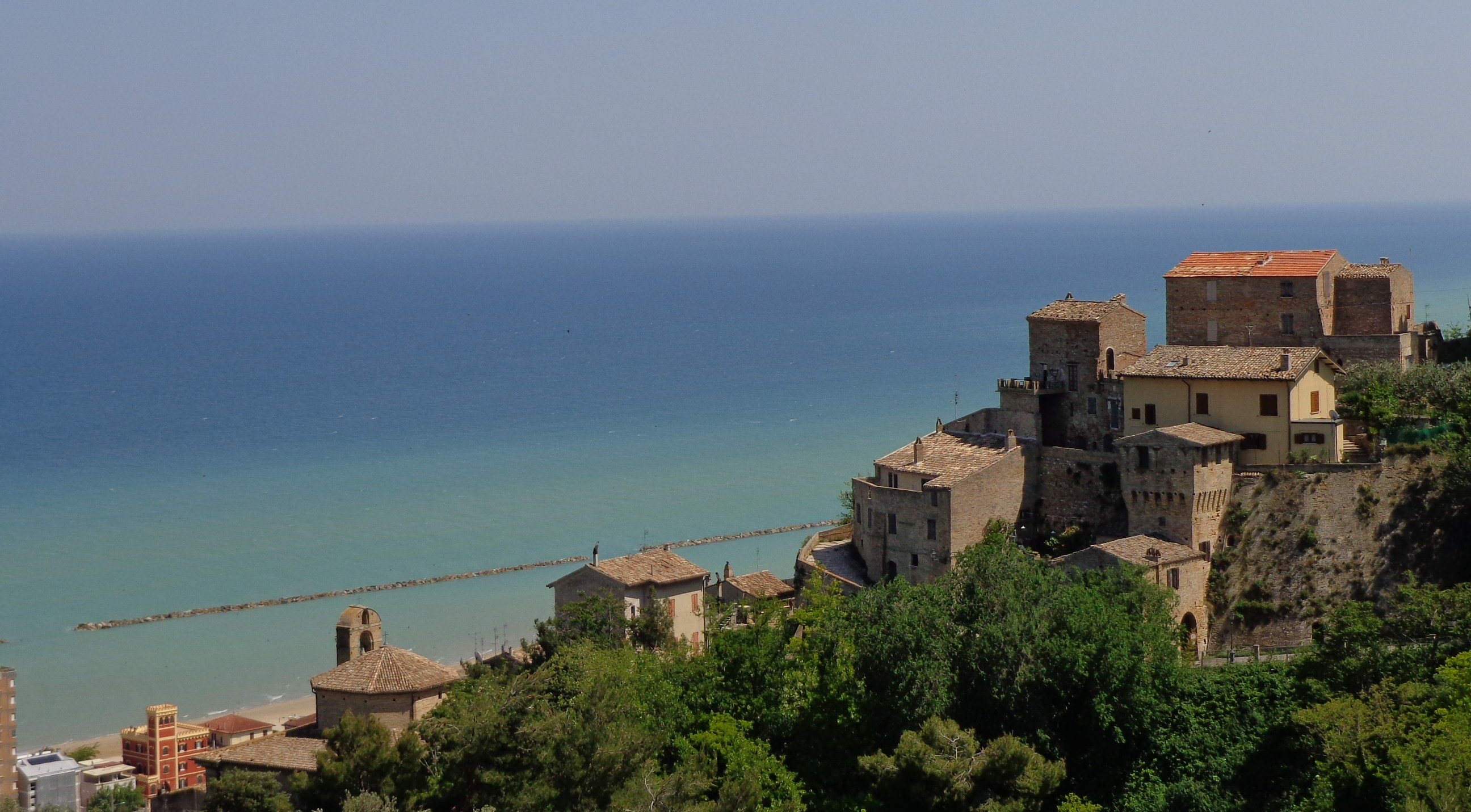
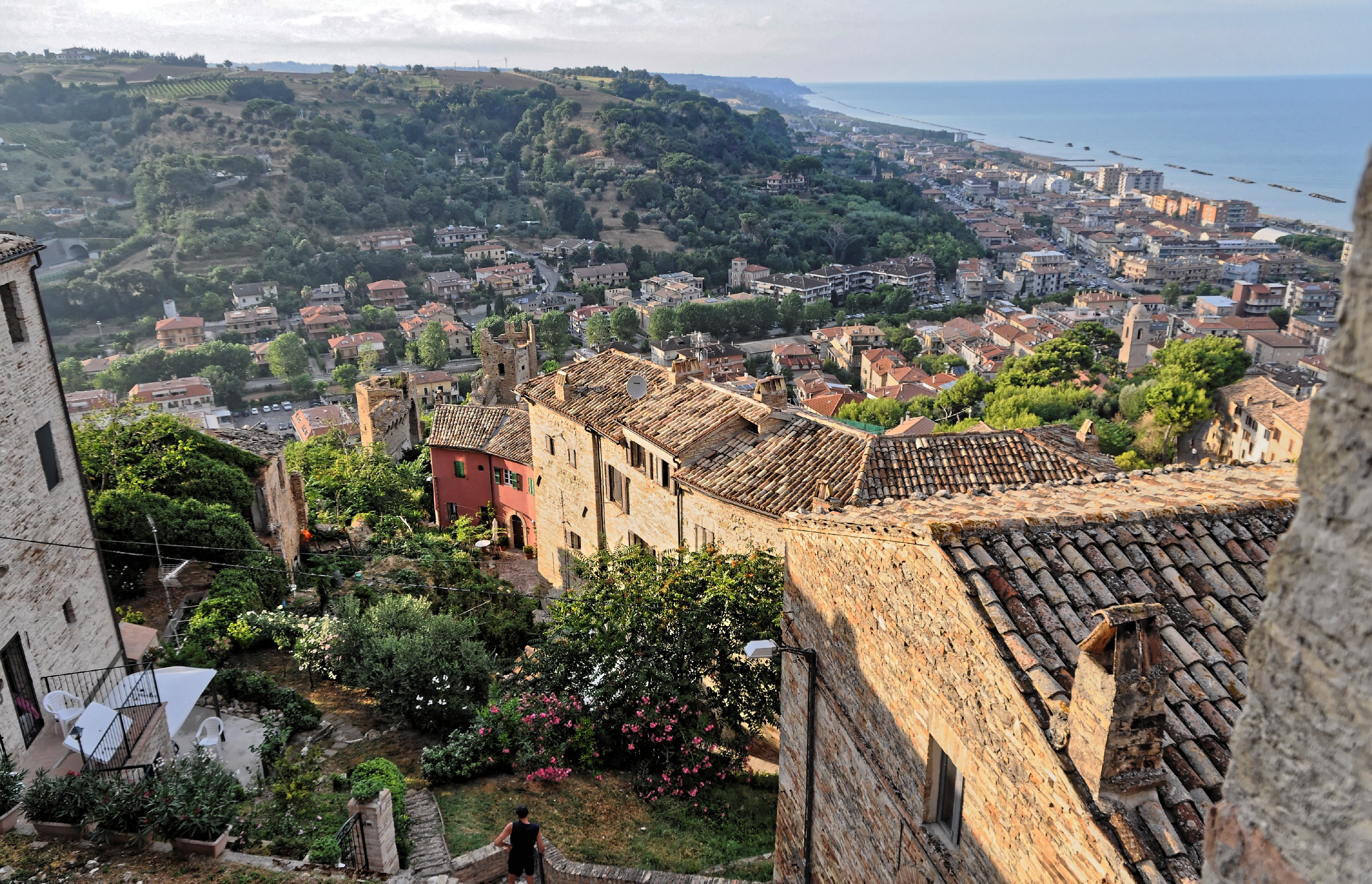
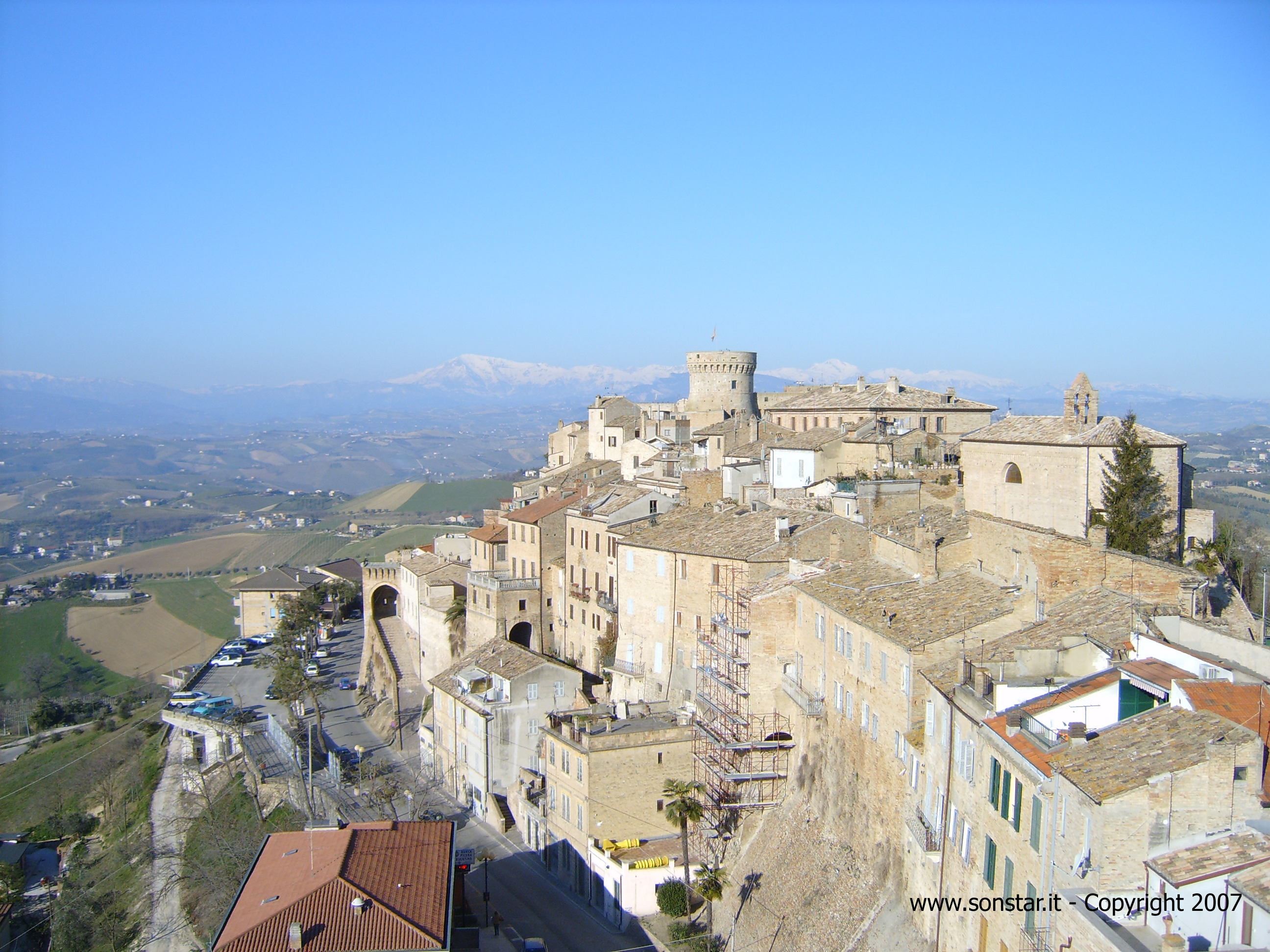
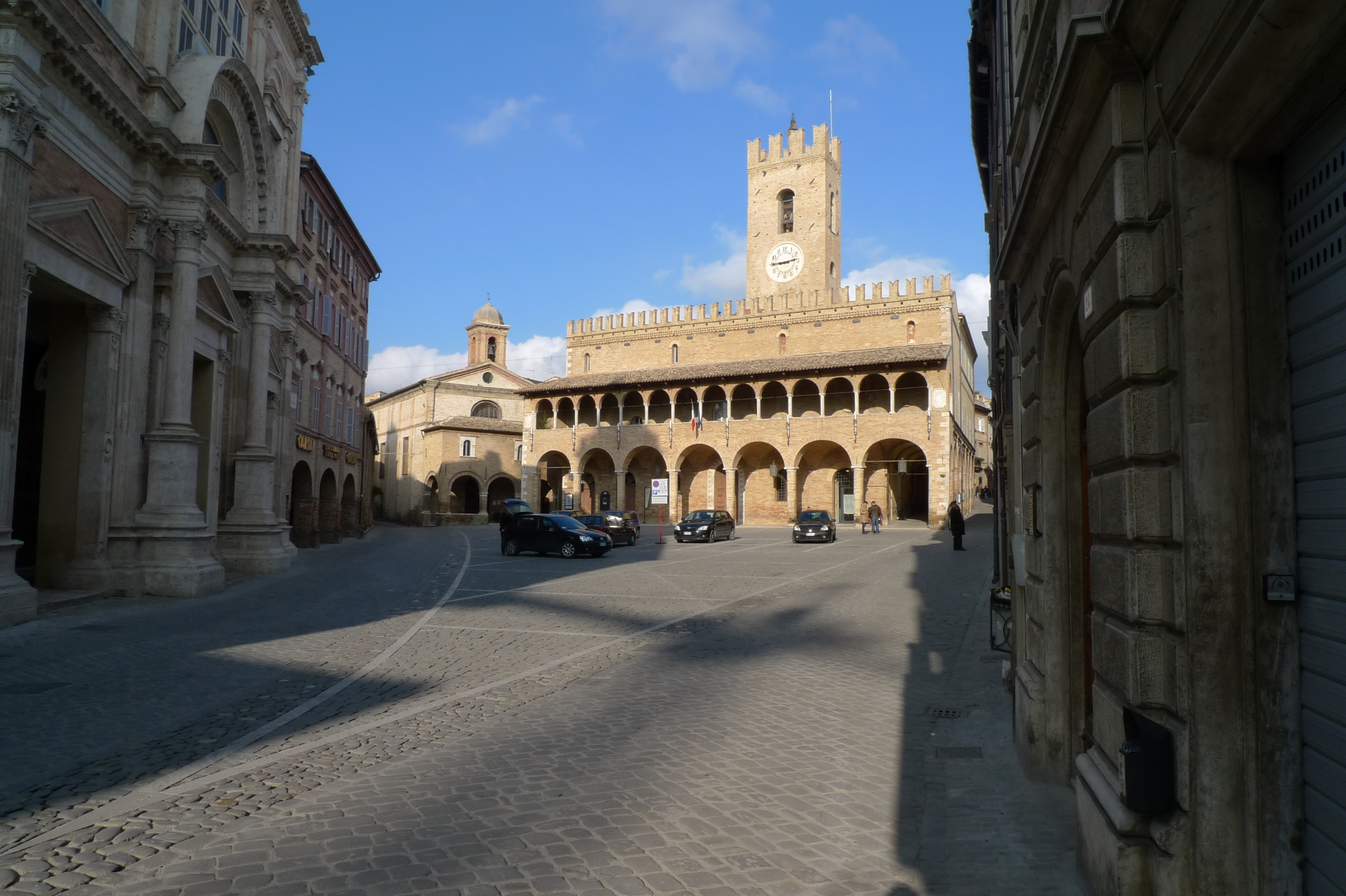
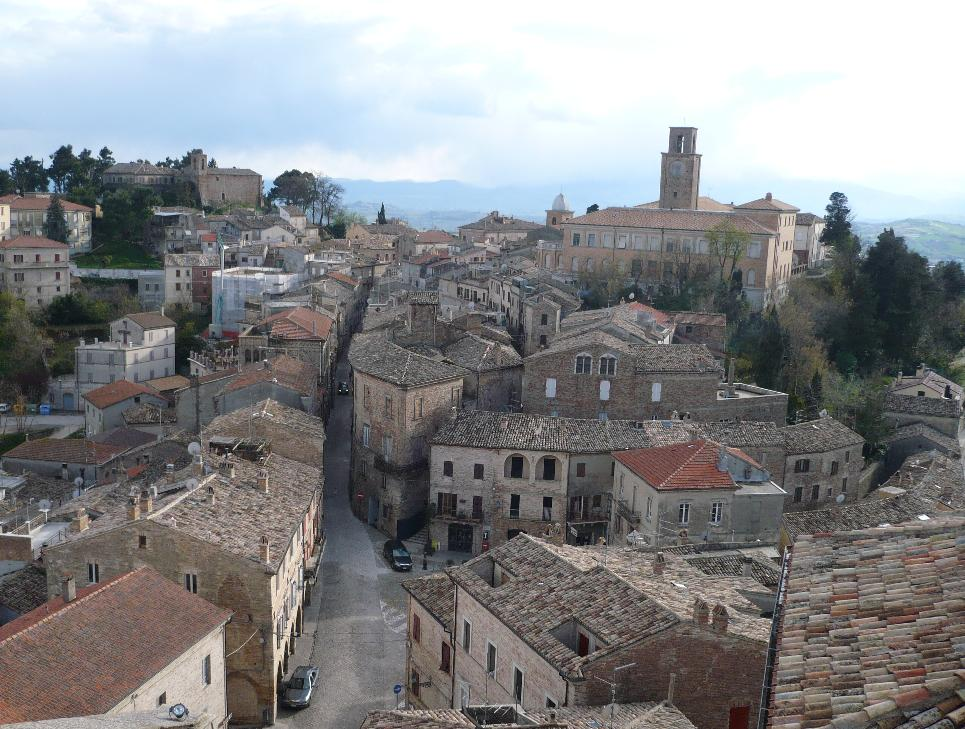
- From top down, left to right: panoramic view of San Benedetto del Tronto, Grottammare, Cupra Marittima, Acquaviva Picena, Offida, Ripatransone
- Interactive map of Riviera delle Palme
- Coordinates: 42°57′N 13°53′E
- Country: Italy
- Regione: Marche
- Website: larivieradellepalme.it.

Riviera delle Palme is a tourist area along the Marche Coast of Italy. It extends from Cupra Marittima to the Tronto River, passing through Grottammare and San Benedetto del Tronto. It is considered one of the most important tourist locations of the Marche region. The name of the region derives from the thousands of palm trees, mainly of the species Phoenix canariensis, Washingtonia and P. sylvestris that are prevalent in the landscape.

Originally the name was attributed only to the area around San Benedetto del Tronto, where about 8,000 palm trees of various species can be found, and where the palm tree has long been a symbol of the city. The name Riviera delle Palme was adopted by a tourist consortium established in 2000 which, in addition to the aforementioned coastal municipalities, also includes municipalities inland.

== San Benedetto del Tronto ==
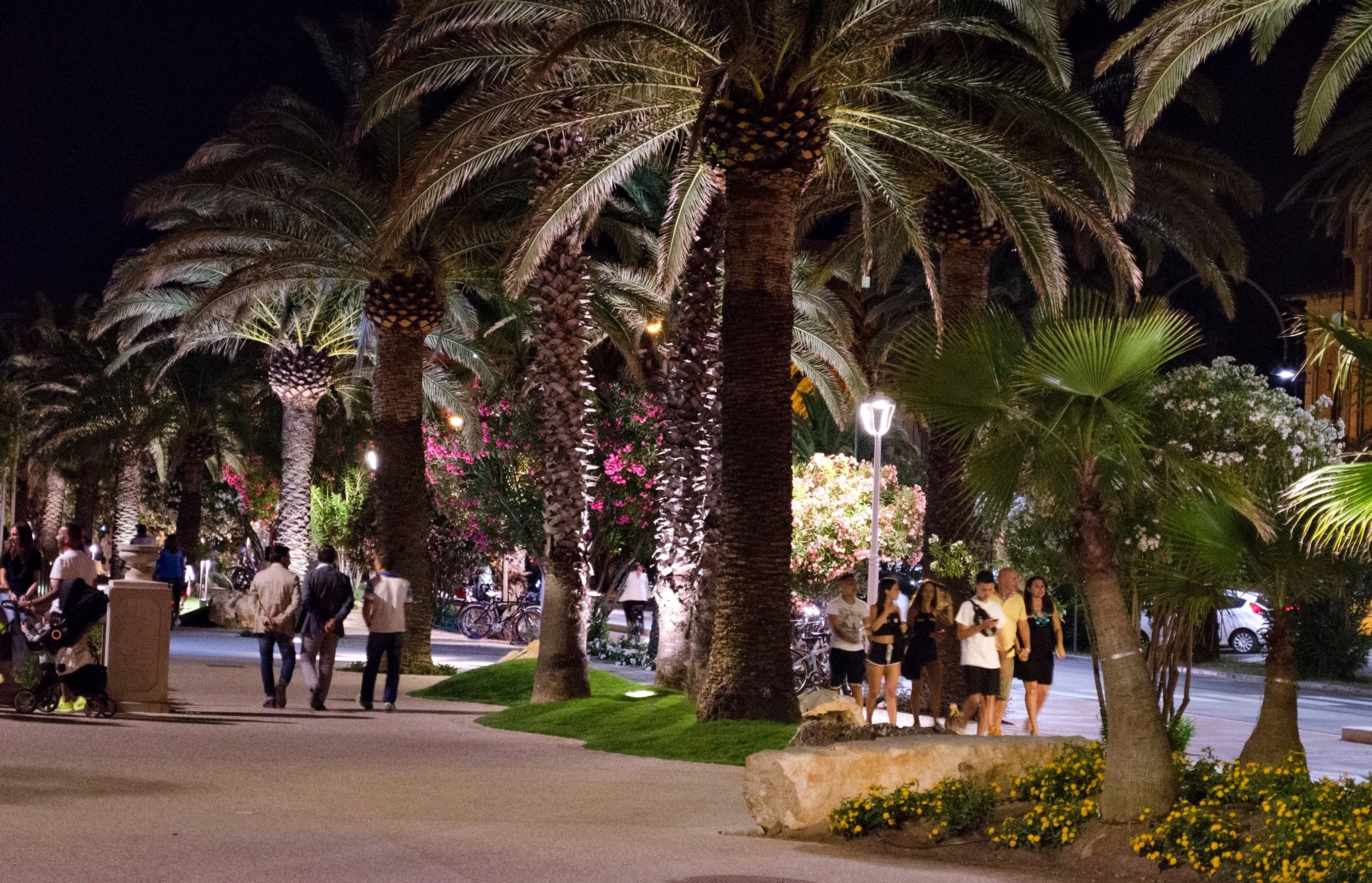
San Benedetto del Tronto – Initial section of the North Promenade

San Benedetto del Tronto is the southernmost coastal municipality of Marche. It is one of the main tourist resorts of the Marche Coast. The city has an historic district (Upper Town) close to the sea. Adjacent to the High Town is the Marina, a fishing village originating in the eighteenth century. A famous landmark in the village is the hexagonal Torre dei Gualtieri dating from the fourteenth century. Equipped with a marina, with about 600 berths, a fishing port and a wholesale fish market, San Benedetto has always been closely linked to the sea and naval traditions. The town's Maritime Museums includes the Museum of the Maritime Civilisation of the Marche, the Museo delle Anfore, the Museo Ittico, and the Antiquarium Truentinum. The Pinacoteca del Mare – inaugurated in April 2009 – although located in the heart of the old prison, is also part of this cluster of museums dedicated to the sea. Along the southern pier of San Benedetto del Tronto is the Museum of Art on the Sea, an open-air museum that hosts 145 works of art, 135 sculptures and 10 large murals.

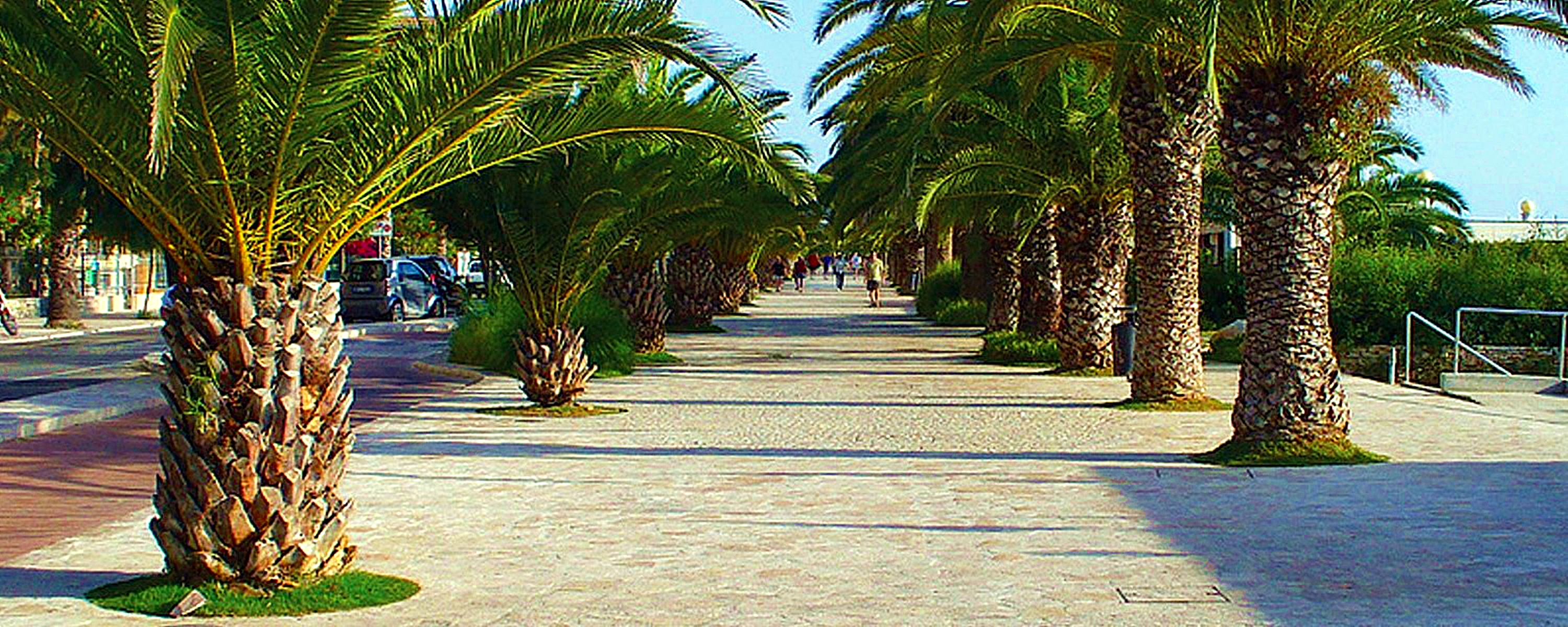
Cycle path and pedestrian area among the palm trees on the southern promenade of San Benedetto del Tronto

The citizens of San Benedetto are proud of its seashore. Some sources cite San Benedetto as one of the most beautiful waterfront in Italy. It was designed by the engineer Luigi Onorati in 1931 and inaugurated the next year. The southern part of the promenade includes ten themed gardens: the multi-sensory garden, the country garden, the garden of Children, Health, Citrus, Mediterranean, Palms, Arid, Humid, Roses. Each of the ten gardens have original features such as fountains, ponds, benches and armchairs for relaxing, games for children, specific tree species and a Cycle Path, designed by the architect Farnush Davarpanah.

Since 2016 the northern part of the promenade, stretching from the Palazzo Las Vegas to the Albula Stream, has been undergoing redevelopment.

San Benedetto del Tronto includes over 300 establishments for visitors including hotels, residences and B&B; Including 150a the seaside resort. San Benedetto was awarded the Blue Flag beach banner, a certification that the beach, the marina, and the sustainable boating tourism operator meets stringent standards of environmental protection. San Benedetto also boasts the Green Flag, in recognition of its children-friendly status.

== Grottammare ==
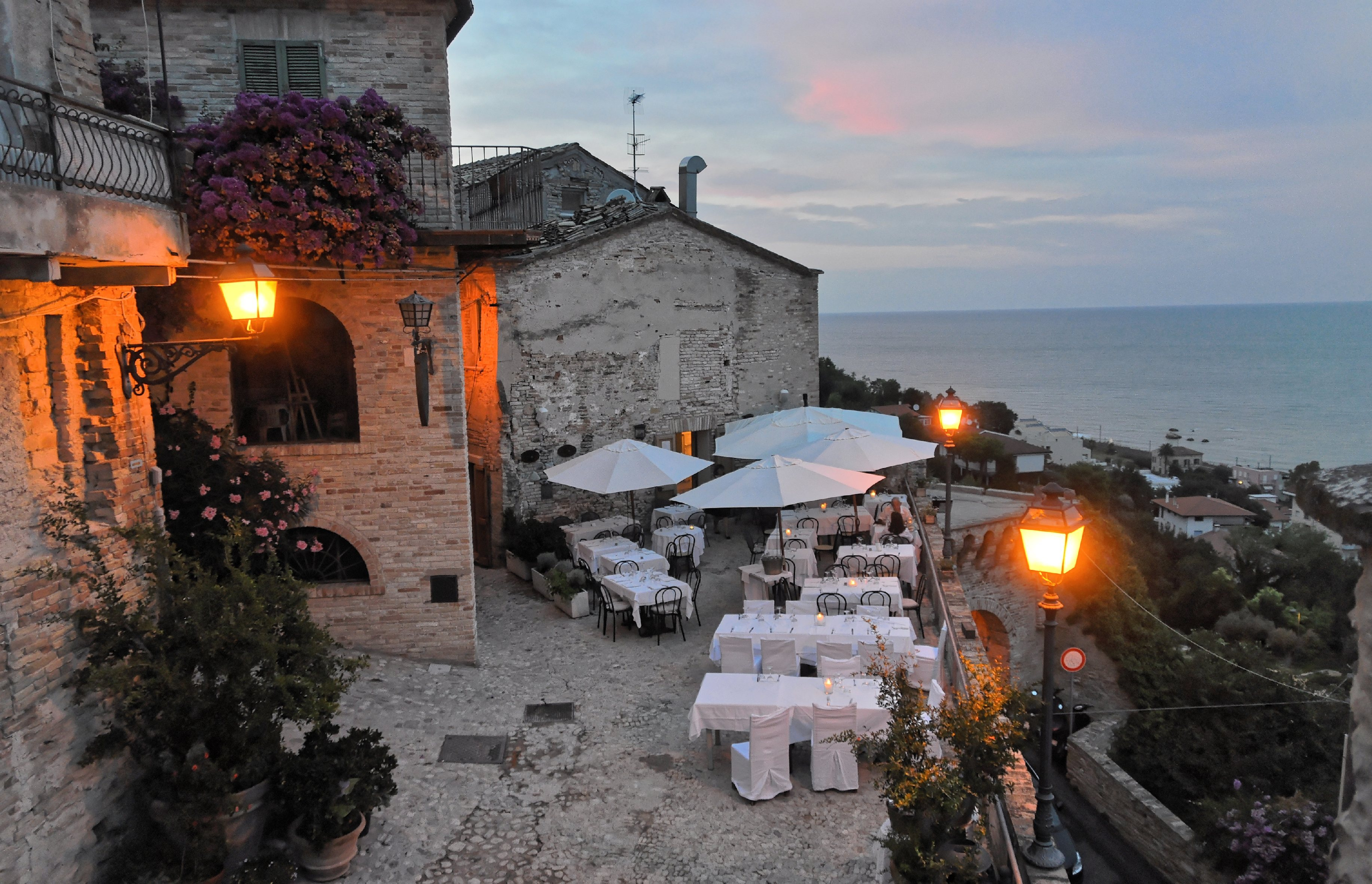
The Grottammare "High Country" which has received an award by I Borghi più belli d'Italia

Grottammare is another renowned tourist resorts of the Marche region, awarded the Blue Flag beach several times by the Touring Club Italiano. It has a long coastline, about five kilometers, where there are numerous beach resorts. Part of the town has received the I Borghi più belli d'Italia award.

The seafront of Grottammare has recently undergone restyling work with the modernisation of the pedestrian area and the addition of a pavement with a cycle path that connects the coast of Grottammare to that of Cupra Marittima. Grottammare has around 100 establishments for visitors.

== Cupra Marittima ==
Cupra Marittima belongs to the district of the Riviera delle Palme of the lower Marche coast. Besides the seashore, three hills define the city landscape; the Hill of Sant'Andrea houses the renovated fortress of Sant'Andrea; the Hill of Marano where the medieval town hall is located; and the Hill of Boccabianca. The beach of Cupra Marittima over two kilometers long, in which there are several Seaside resort. A long bike path crosses the seafront and continues until Grottammare. It has also received the Blue Flag beach.

The pride of the town is the Piceno Malacological Museum, one of the most important shell museums in the world. The collection houses over 900,000 pieces and interesting pieces. In the Archaeological site of Cupra Marittima, located in the north of the town, the urban layout of the Roman city can be seen.

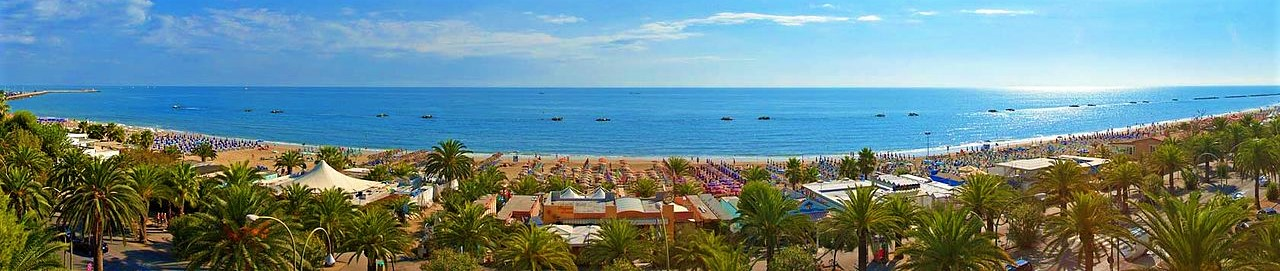
The beach of San Benedetto del Tronto

== Tourist Consortium ==
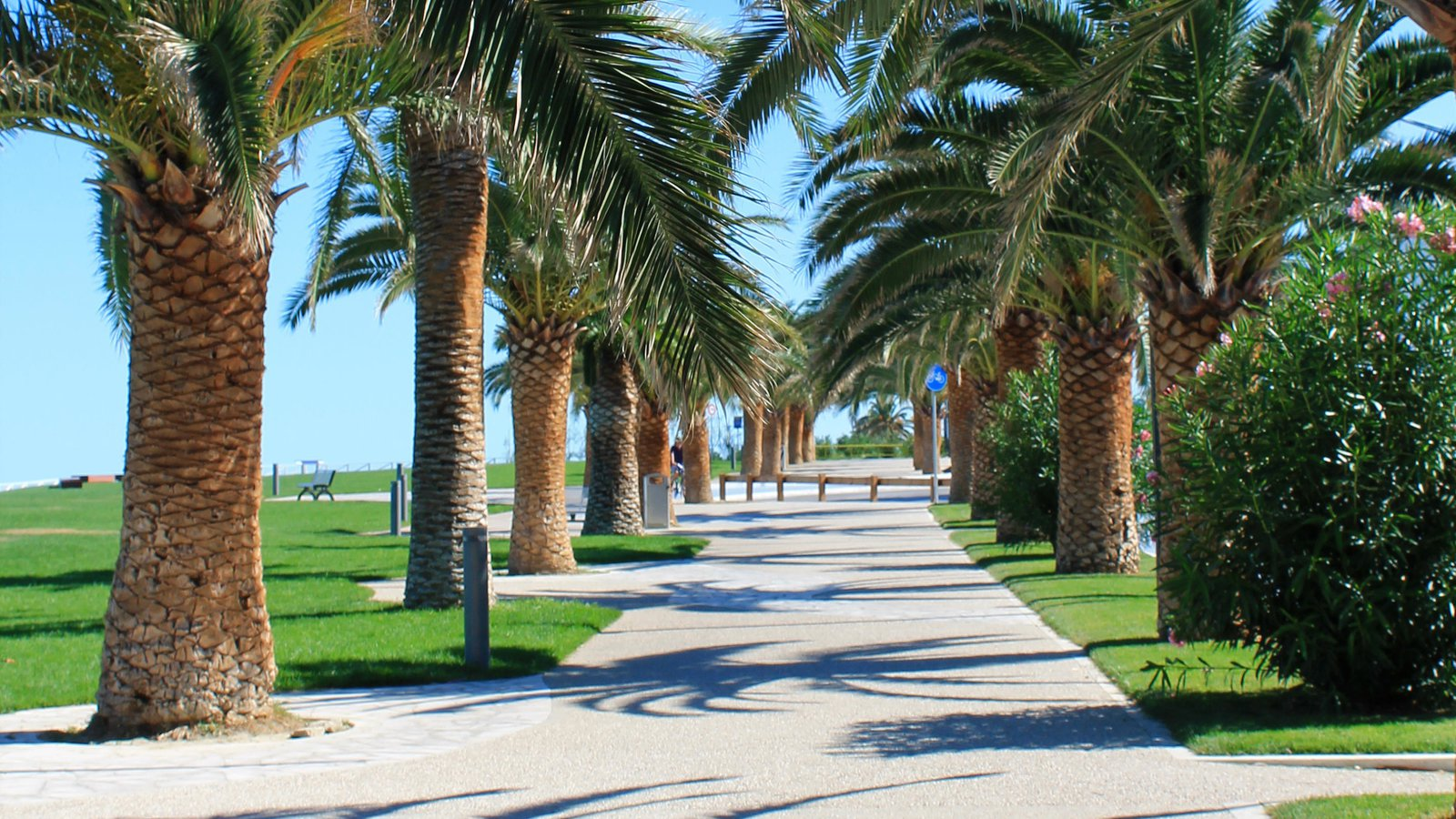
The new section of the northern waterfront of Grottammare

Established in the year 2000, the "Riviera delle Palme" tourist consortium was created to inform, promote and develop the touristic potential of the area internationally. Initially, the consortium only covered the area of San Benedetto del Tronto. Later the nearby seaside resorts of Grottammare and Cupra Marittima were included to the consortium in order to enrich the bathing offer. The consortium promotes important cultural events, highlights the natural beauties of the Adriatic Sea, and showcases riches of the hinterland sambenedettese. The Consortium was expanded to include the municipalities of Offida, Monteprandone, Acquaviva Picena, Ripatransone, and, more recently, also the Lazio municipality of Accumoli (in Province of Rieti).

== Awards ==
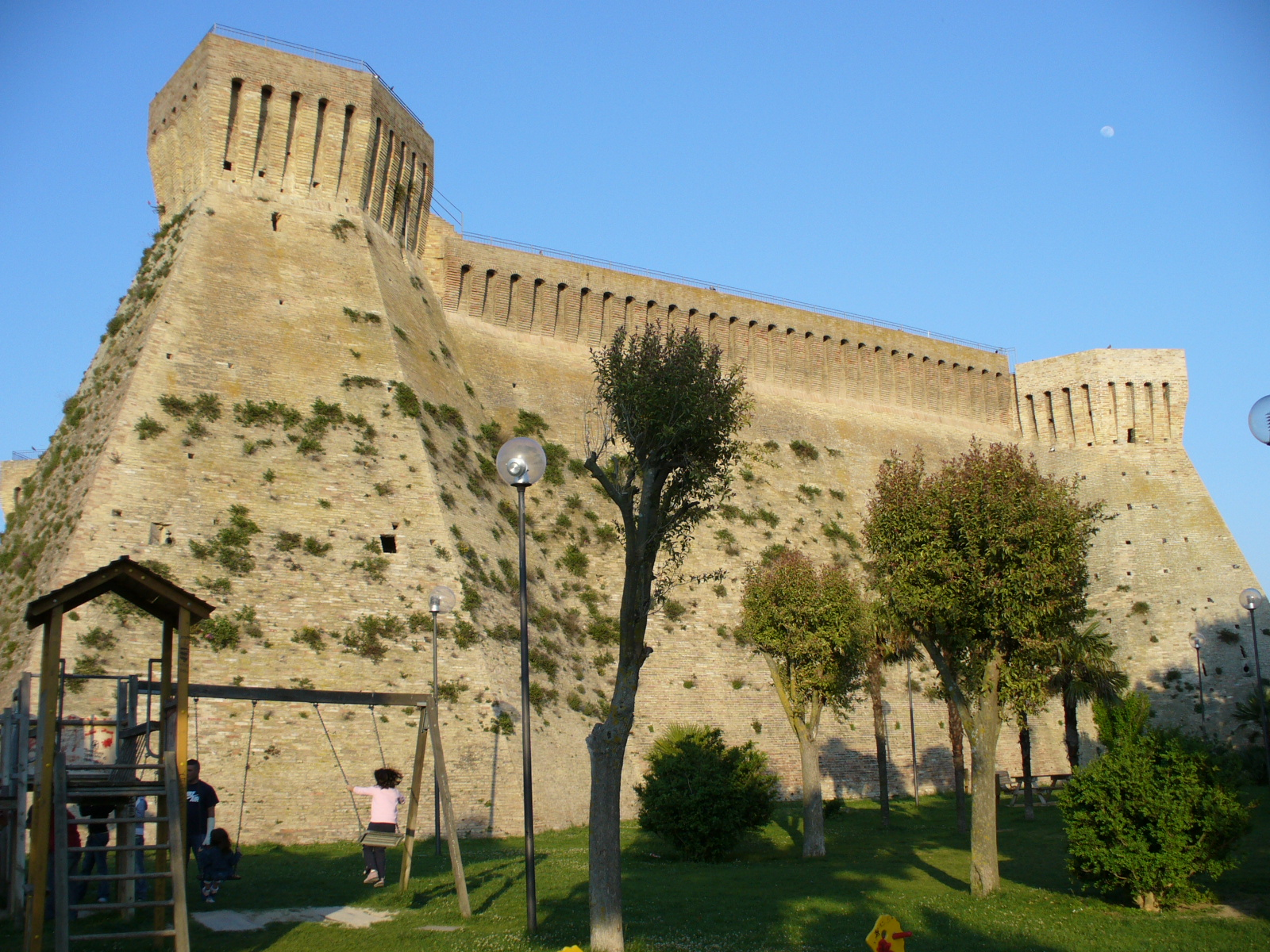
Fortezza di Acquaviva Picena, medieval fortress

- Acquaviva Picena - Bandiera arancione
- Cupra Marittima - Blue Flag beach
- Grottammare - Blue Flag beach, I Borghi più belli d'Italia
- Monteprandone - I Borghi più belli d'Italia
- Offida - I Borghi più belli d'Italia
- Ripatransone - Bandiera arancione
- San Benedetto del Tronto - Blue Flag beach

== See also ==
- Marche
- Province of Ascoli Piceno
- San Benedetto del Tronto Waterfront
