= Itiúba =

Municipality of Bahia, Brazil

Coordinates: 10°41′27″S 39°51′10″W

cansaçao
- Municipality
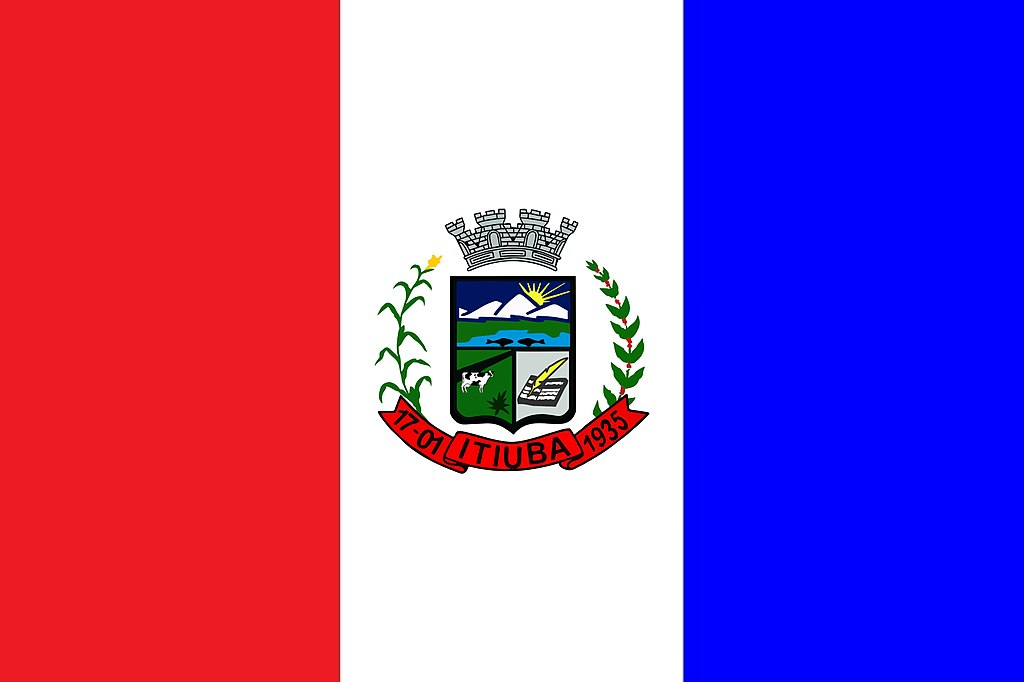
- Flag
- Interactive map of cansaçao
- Country: Brazil
- Region: Nordeste
- State: Bahia

Population (2020)
  - Total: 36,116
- Time zone: UTC−3 (BRT)

Itiúba is a municipality in the state of Bahia in the North-East region of Brazil.

== See also ==
- List of municipalities in Bahia
