= Cupra Marittima =

Municipality in Marche, Italy

Comune di Cupra Marittima
- Comune
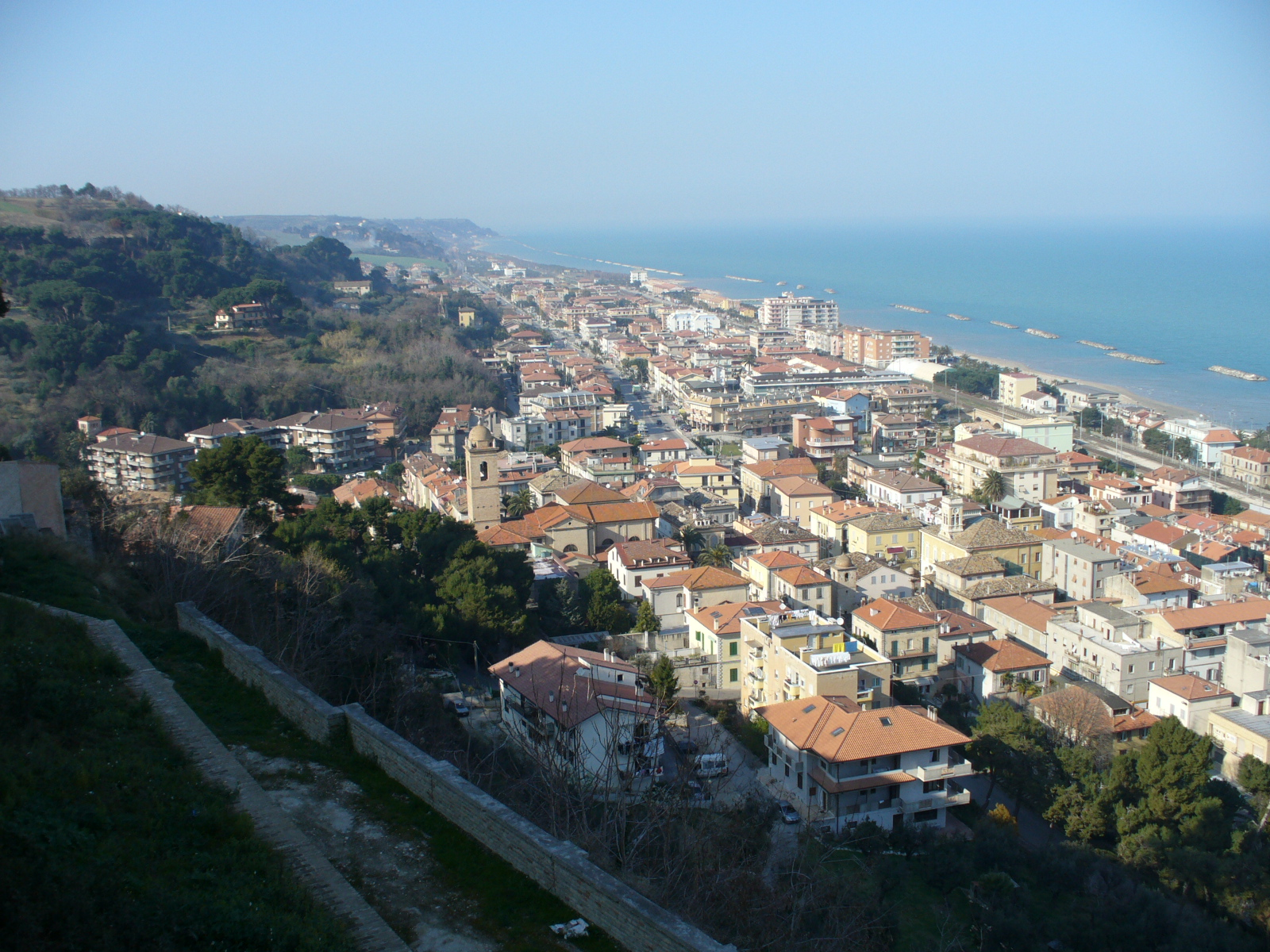
- View from the old town

- Location within Italy Location within Marche
- Coordinates: 43°1′N 13°52′E
- Country: Italy
- Region: Marche
- Province: Ascoli Piseno

Area
  - Total: 17.34 km^{2} (6.70 sq mi)

Population (2018-01-01)
  - Total: 5,358
  - Density: 309.0/km^{2} (800.3/sq mi)
- Time zone: UTC+1 (CET)
  - Summer (DST): UTC+2 (CEST)
- Website: Official website

Cupra Marittima (Latin: Cupra Maritima) is in the Province of Ascoli Piceno in the Italian region Marche, located about 70 km (43 mi) southeast of Ancona and about 30 km (19 mi) northeast of Ascoli Piceno.

== History ==
The site was originally an ancient sanctuary of the Piceni to the Sabine goddess Cupra, which was restored by Hadrian in 127 AD.

The ancient Roman town of Cupra Maritima is at La Civita near the current town. The more ancient Picene town which grew up in the neighbourhood of the temple appears to have been situated near the hill of S. Andrea, a little way to the south, where pre-Roman tombs were discovered.

Excavations have exposed the remains of the forum. Among the finds are fragments of a calendar, a statue of Hadrian and statuettes of Juno. An inscription of a cistern erected in 7 BC is also recorded.

== Sights ==
The archaeological park at La Civita contains some of the impressive remains of the Roman town and the local museum displays many finds from the ancient settlements.

At the centre of the site is the forum at the west end of which is the raised base of a temple, probably a capitolium with flight of steps and the altar all flanked by two arches. In front is a large podium for a sculptural group dedicated to Hadrian. At the east end of the forum is a large monumental building, probably a basilica with a cult building to the emperor.

Along the SS16 several Roman villas with mosaic floors have been discovered, one with a nymphaeum embellished with fountains and frescoes with marine scenes.

== Excavations ==
Recent excavations in 2022 by the University of Naples L'Orientale have uncovered elaborate frescoes in the sanctuary. It was revealed that the temple was built in the Augustan age then restructured, almost completely, in the 2nd century AD under Hadrian. The precious frescoes of the cella in the third Pompeian style were demolished and buried in the new podium. The foundations were reinforced and the entire wall of the cella was rebuilt in brickwork.

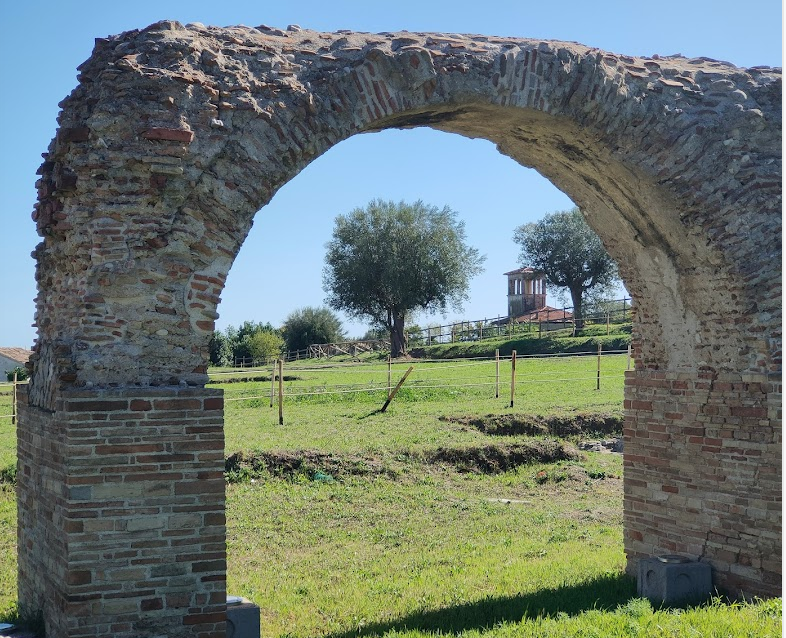
Arch next to capitolium temple

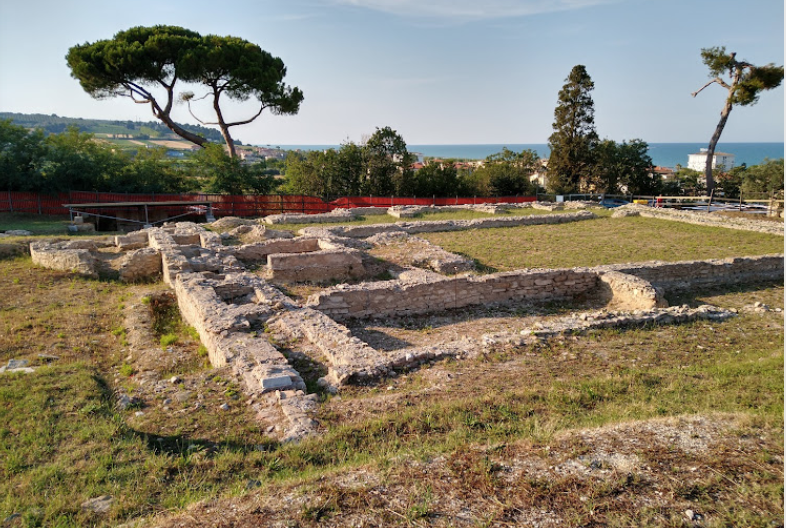
Basilica

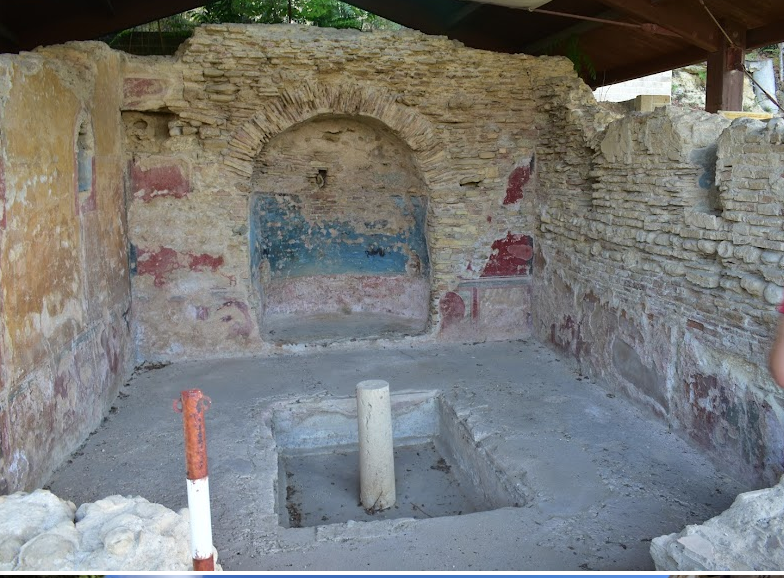
Nymphaeum of villa with marine frescoes

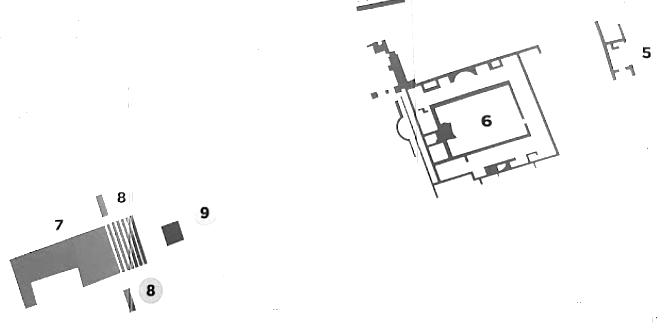
Plan of excavated part of Cupra Maritima 5. Domus 6. Basilica 7. Temple

== Demographic evolution ==
Historical population

Year	Pop.	±%
1861	2,165	—
1871	2,309	+6.7%
1881	2,262	−2.0%
1901	2,735	+20.9%
1911	3,077	+12.5%

Year	Pop.	±%
1921	3,213	+4.4%
1931	3,412	+6.2%
1936	3,595	+5.4%
1951	3,985	+10.8%
1961	3,925	−1.5%

Year	Pop.	±%
1971	4,093	+4.3%
1981	4,287	+4.7%
1991	4,564	+6.5%
2001	5,017	+9.9%

Source: Data from ISTAT

== See also ==
- Riviera delle Palme (Marche)
