= Raccordo autostradale RA11 =

Controlled-access highway in Italy

Raccordo autostradale 11
- Motorway connection 11
- Superstrada Ascoli-Mare; Ascoli-sea expressway

Route information
- Maintained by ANAS
- Length: 26.0 km (16.2 mi)
- Existed: 1990–present

Major junctions
- West end: Ascoli Piceno
- A14 in San Benedetto del Tronto
- East end: San Benedetto del Tronto

Location
- Country: Italy
- Regions: Marche, Abruzzo

Highway system
- Roads in Italy; Autostrade; State; Regional; Provincial; Municipal
← RA 10	→ RA 12

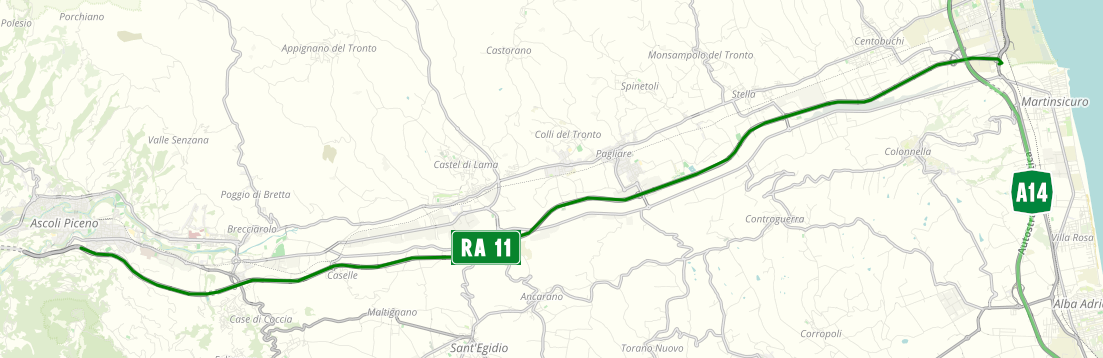
Detailed map of the Raccordo autostradale RA11

Raccordo autostradale 11 (RA 11; "Motorway connection 11") or superstrada Ascoli-Mare ("Ascoli-sea expressway") is an autostrada (Italian for "motorway") 26.0 kilometres (16.2 mi) long in Italy located in the regions of Marche and Abruzzo, and managed by ANAS, which connects Ascoli Piceno to the Autostrada A14 near to the Adriatic Sea, as a variant to the old route of Strada statale 4 "Via Salaria" that previously carried out that function.

== Route ==
RACCORDO AUTOSTRADALE 11; Superstrada Ascoli-Mare
Exit	↓km↓	↑km↑	Province	European Route
Via Salaria; Acquasanta Terme - Arquata del Tronto; Monti Sibillini National Park - Monti della Laga; Roma - Rieti - delle Tre Valli Umbre - Spoleto	0.0 km (0 mi)	26.0 km (16.2 mi)	AP	--
Ascoli Piceno centro Castel Trosino; Colle San Marco - Montagna dei Fiori	0.0 km (0 mi)	26.0 km (16.2 mi)	AP	--
Ascoli Piceno est - Folignano; Piceno Aprutina - Teramo; Costanzo e Giacomo Mazzoni Hospital; Industrial area	2.7 km (1.7 mi)	23.6 km (14.7 mi)	AP	--
Maltignano; Sant'Egidio alla Vibrata	5.7 km (3.5 mi)	20.6 km (12.8 mi)	AP	--
Ancarano - Castel di Lama; Industrial area Appignano del Tronto - Offida - Castorano - Sant'Egidio alla Vibrata	10.3 km (6.4 mi)	16.0 km (9.9 mi)	TE	--
Spinetoli; Pagliare del Tronto - Colli del Tronto - Castorano; Controguerra - Corropoli - Torano Nuovo	14.5 km (9.0 mi)	11.8 km (7.3 mi)	AP	--
Monsampolo del Tronto; Acquaviva Picena - Colonnella - Controguerra	19.2 km (11.9 mi)	7.1 km (4.4 mi)	AP	--
Monteprandone; Centobuchi; Via Salaria	24.2 km (15.0 mi)	0.5 km (0.31 mi)	AP	--
Bologna-Taranto	24.5 km (15.2 mi)	2.0 km (1.2 mi)	AP	--
Adriatica; San Benedetto del Tronto - Martinsicuro - Alba Adriatica	26.0 km (16.2 mi)	0.0 km (0 mi)	AP	--

== See also ==
- Autostrade of Italy
- Roads in Italy
- Transport in Italy

=== Other Italian roads ===
- State highways (Italy)
- Regional road (Italy)
- Provincial road (Italy)
- Municipal road (Italy)
