= Maypole =

Tall wooden pole erected as a part of various European folk festivals

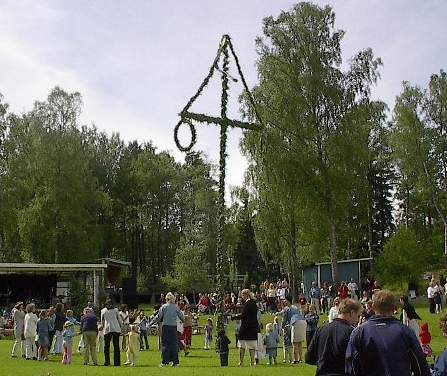
Dancing around the midsummer pole, in Åmmeberg, Sweden

A maypole is a tall wooden pole erected as a part of various European folk festivals, around which a maypole dance often takes place.

The festivals may occur on 1 May or Pentecost (Whitsun), although in some countries it is instead erected during Midsummer (20–26 June). In some cases, the maypole is a permanent feature that is only utilized during the festival, although in other cases it is erected specifically for the purpose before being taken down again.

Primarily found within the nations of Germanic Europe and the neighboring areas which they have influenced, its origins remain unknown. It has often been speculated that the maypole originally had some importance in the Germanic paganism of Iron Age and early Medieval cultures and that the tradition survived Christianisation, albeit losing any original meaning that it had. It has been a recorded practice in many parts of Europe throughout the Medieval and Early Modern periods, although it became less popular in the 18th and 19th centuries. Today, the tradition is still observed in some parts of Europe and among European communities in the Americas.

== Symbolism ==
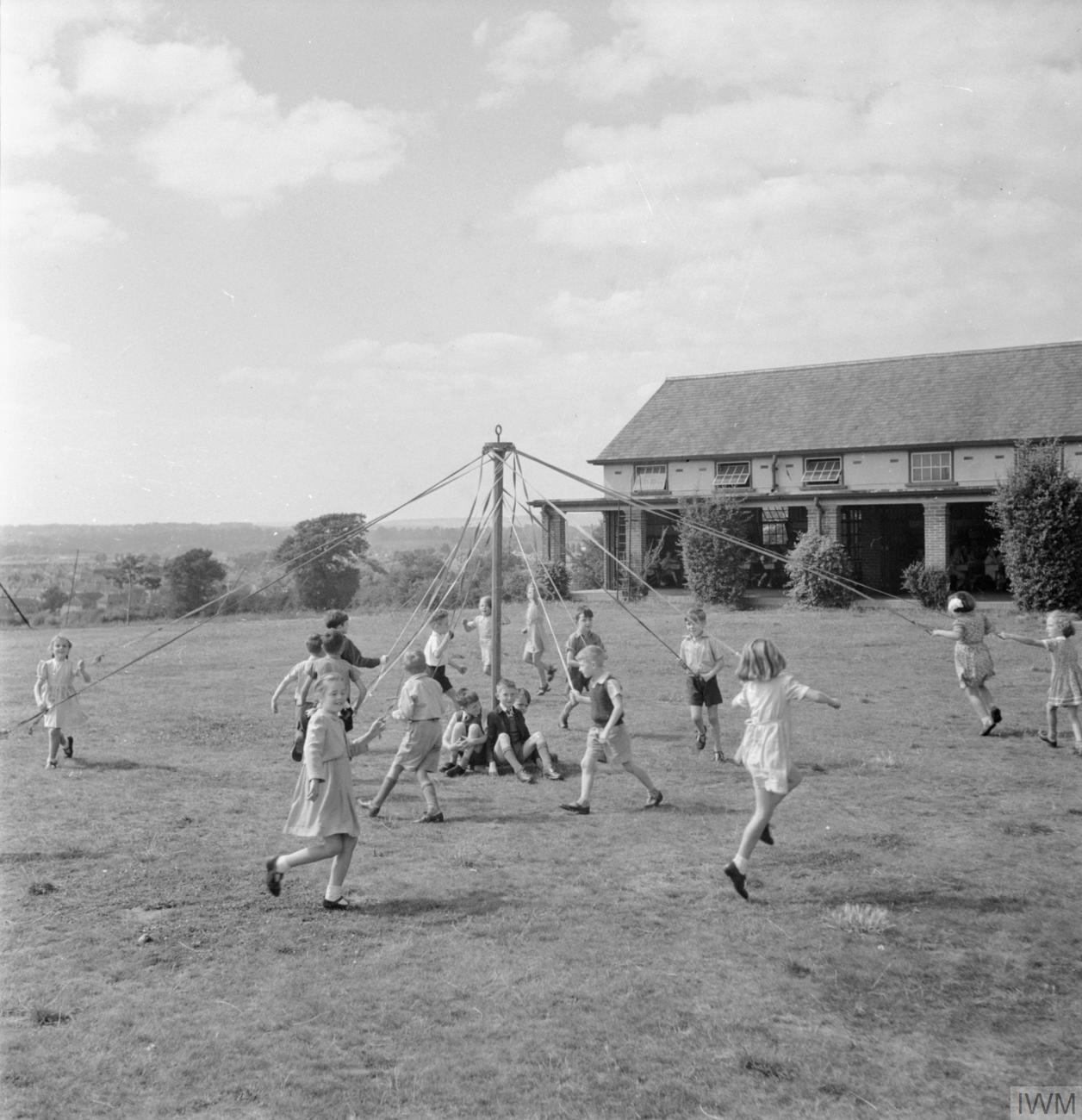
Children dancing around a maypole in England, 1945

English historian Ronald Hutton concurs with Swedish scholar Carl Wilhelm von Sydow who stated that maypoles were erected "simply" as "signs that the happy season of warmth and comfort had returned." Their shape allowed for garlands to be hung from them and were first seen, at least in the British Isles, between AD 1350 and 1400 within the context of medieval Christian European culture. In 1588, at Holy Trinity Church in Exeter, villagers gathered around the 'summer rod' for feasting and drinking. Geoffrey Chaucer mentions that a particularly large maypole stood at St Andrew Undershaft, which was collectively erected by church parishioners annually due to its large shape.

The symbolism of the maypole has been continuously debated by folklorists for centuries, although no definitive answer has been found. Some scholars classify maypoles as symbols of the world axis (axis mundi). The fact that they were found primarily in areas of Germanic Europe, where, prior to Christianisation, Germanic paganism was followed in various forms, has led to speculation by some that the maypoles were in some way a relic of a Germanic pagan tradition. One theory holds that they were a remnant of the Germanic reverence for sacred trees, as there is evidence for various sacred trees and wooden pillars that were venerated by the pagans across much of Germanic Europe, including Thor's Oak and the Irminsul. Ronald Hutton, however, states that "there is absolutely no evidence that the maypole was regarded as a reflection of it." It is also known that, in Norse paganism, cosmological views held that the universe was a world tree, known as Yggdrasil.

Some observers have proposed phallic symbolism, an idea which was expressed by Thomas Hobbes, who wrongly believed that the poles dated back to the Roman worship of the god Priapus. This notion has been supported by various figures since, including the psychoanalyst Sigmund Freud. Phallic symbolism has been attributed to the maypole in the later early modern period, as one sexual reference is in John Cleland's controversial novel Fanny Hill:

... and now, disengaged from the shirt, I saw, with wonder and surprise, what? not the plaything of a boy, not the weapon of a man, but a maypole of so enormous a standard, that had proportions been observed, it must have belonged to a young giant.

Ronald Hutton has stated, however, that "there is no historical basis for his claim and no sign that the people who used maypoles thought that they were phallic" and that "they were not carved to appear so."

The anthropologist Mircea Eliade theorizes that the maypoles were simply a part of the general rejoicing at the return of summer, and the growth of new vegetation. In this way, they bore similarities with the May Day garlands which were also a common festival practice in Britain and Ireland.

== Regional traditions ==
=== Europe ===
==== Belgium ====
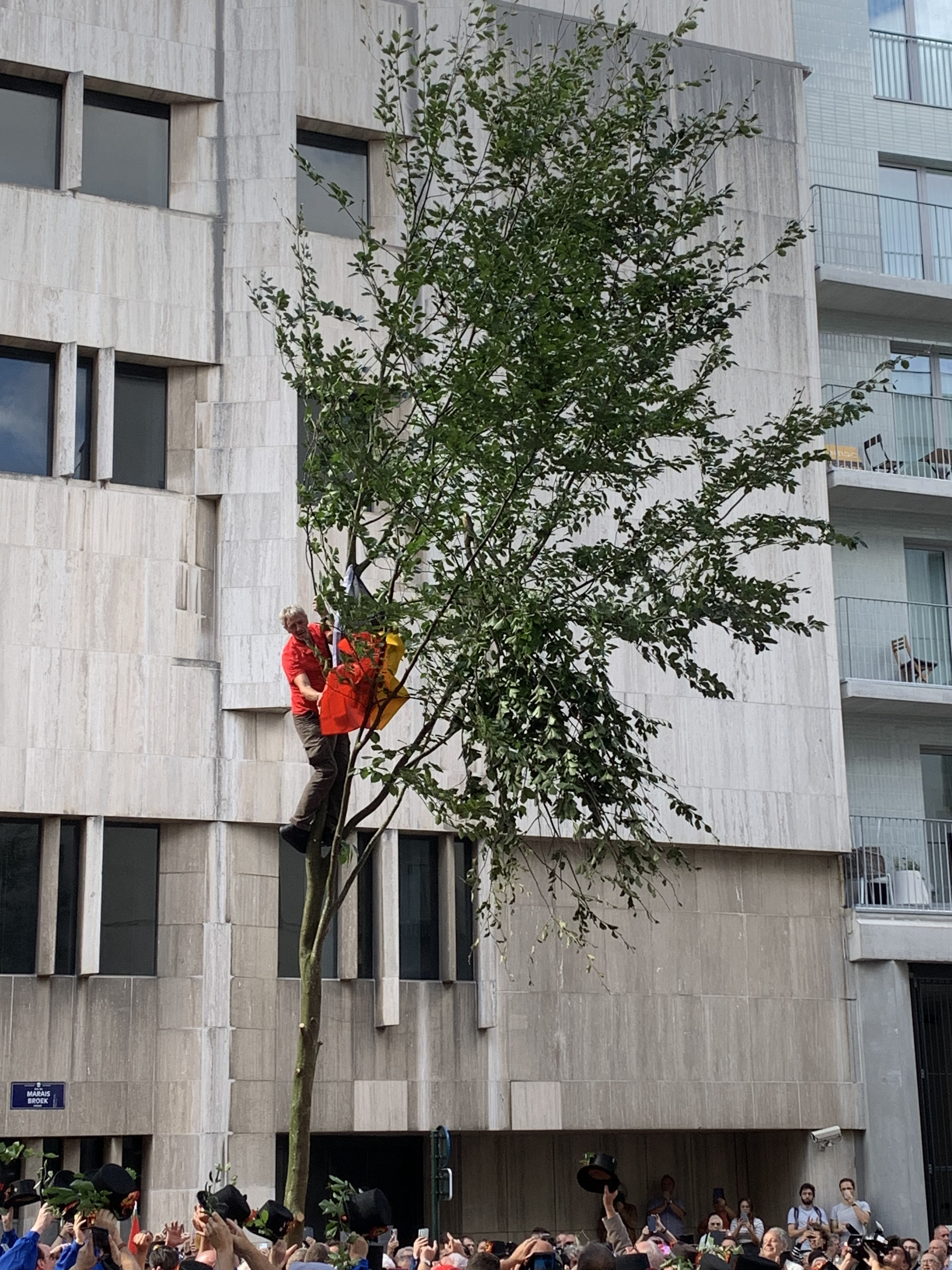
The planting of the Meyboom in Brussels, Belgium

In Belgium, the Maypole is called Meiboom or Meyboom in Dutch. Hasselt erects its Meiboom on 30 April. In Brussels and Leuven, the Meyboom is traditionally erected on 9 August before 5 p.m.

The planting of the Meyboom in Brussels is reminiscent of a long-standing (folkloric) feud with Leuven, dating back to 1213. In that year, a brawl broke out between the two cities, which saw the former victorious. To commemorate this event, Brussels was granted, almost 100 years later, the eternal right by John II, Duke of Brabant, to erect a Meyboom, but only if they managed to do this every year on 9 August before 5 p.m. Following a "theft" of the tree in 1974, Leuven has also claimed ownership of the only official Meyboom. Ever since, the two cities have been involved in a friendly rivalry to decide who has the "real" Meyboom.

It is also customary, mostly in the Dutch-speaking region of Belgium, to place a branch (also called a Meiboom) on the highest point of a building under construction. The erection of the branch is often cause for celebration by both the workmen and the neighbors.

==== Germany and Austria ====
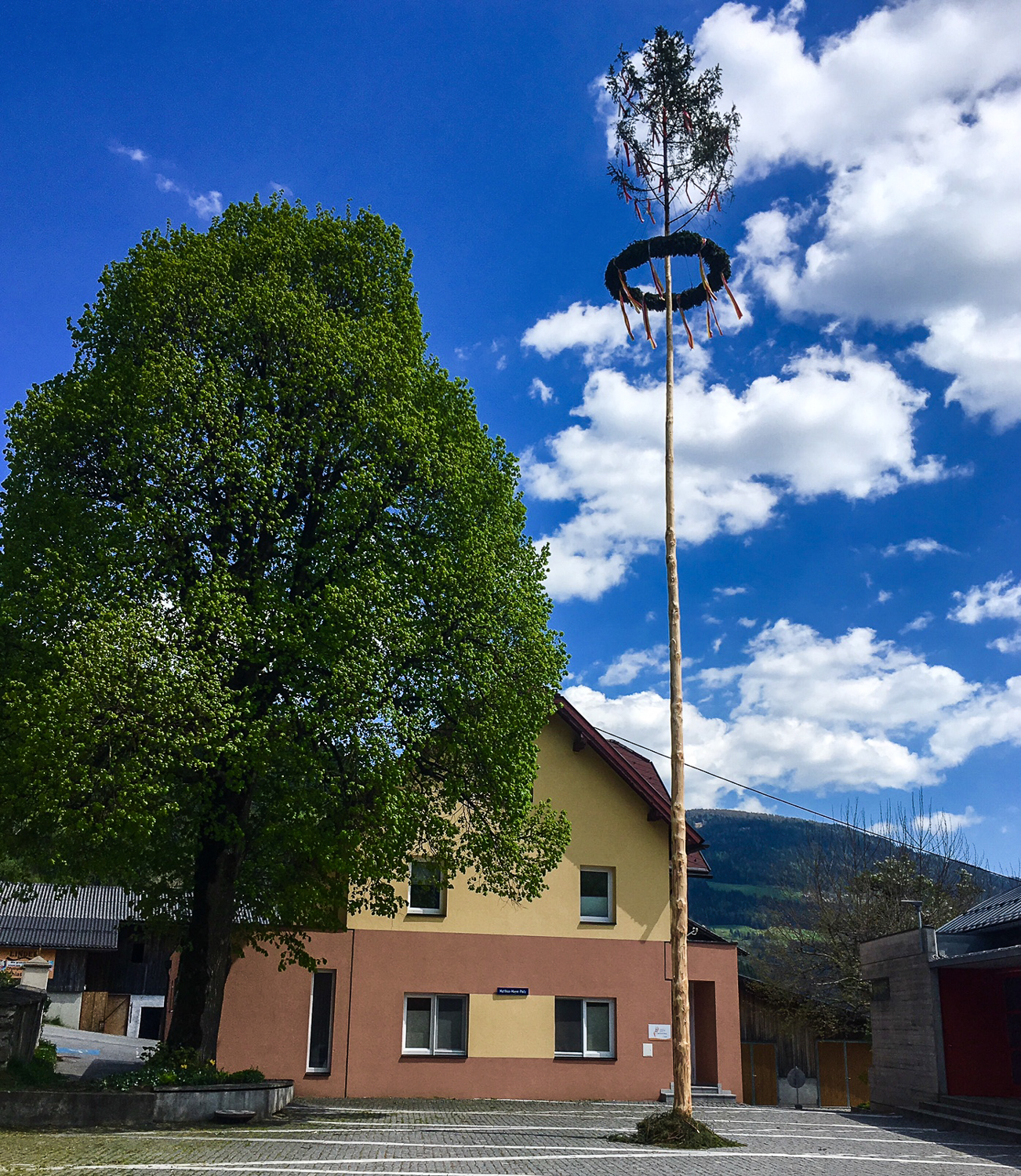
Maypole, Villach Land, Carinthia, Austria

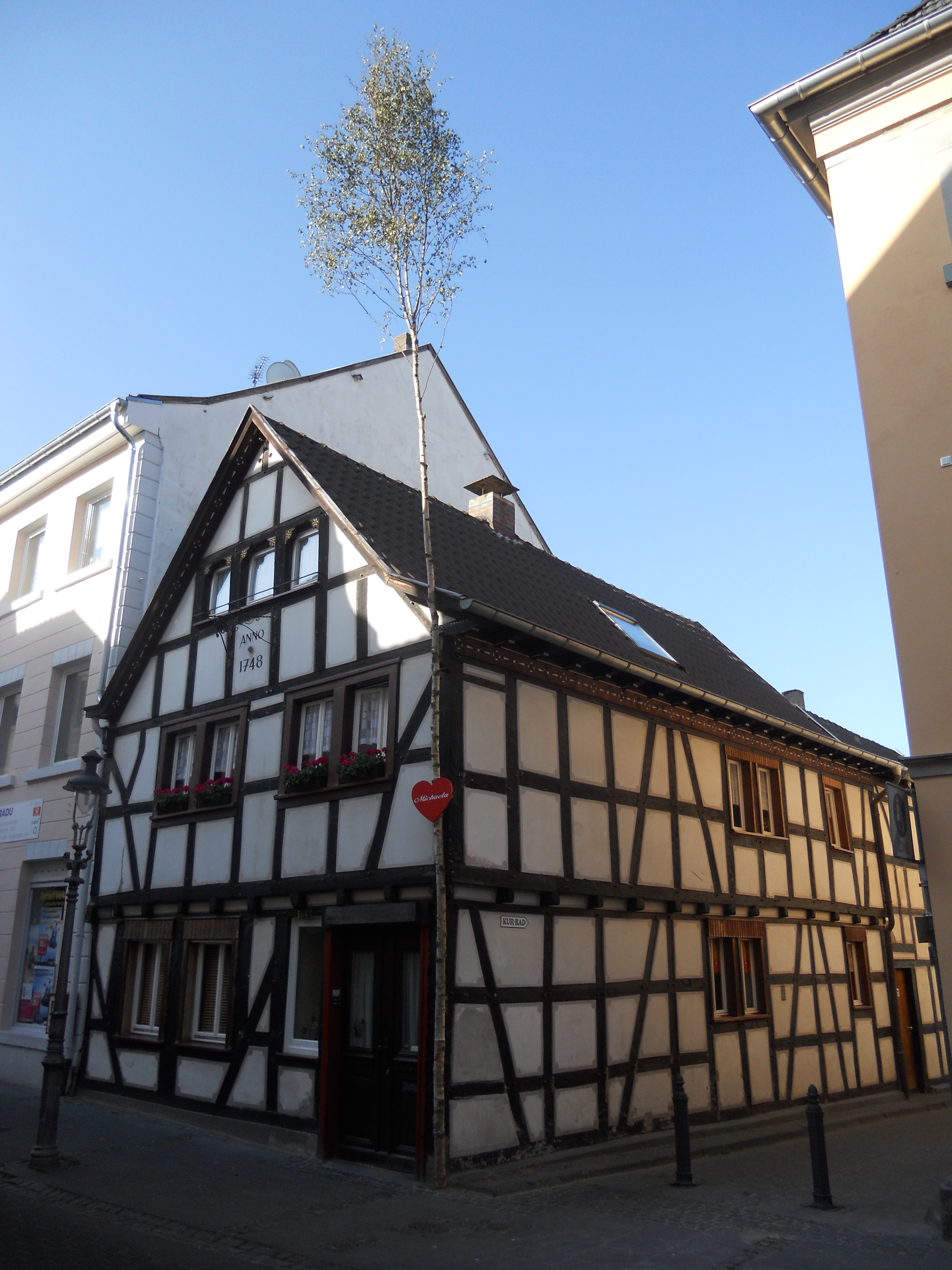
Rhenish maypole for a girl in Königswinter, Germany

In Germany and Austria, the maypole (or Maibaum) is a tradition going back to the 16th century. It is a decorated tree or tree trunk that is usually erected either on 1 May – in Baden and Swabia – or on the evening before, for example, in East Frisia. In most areas, especially in Baden-Württemberg, Bavaria, and Austria, it is usual to have a ceremony to erect the maypole on the village green. The custom of combining it with a village or town fete, which usually takes place on 1 May or April 30 at Pentecost (Whitsun), is widespread. This tradition is especially strong in the villages of the Bavarian Alps where the raising of the traditional maypole on 1 May in the village square is a cause for much celebration. Some poles are painted in the Bavarian colors of white and blue; most are decorated with emblems depicting local crafts and industry. In Bavaria, the Maibaum is procured, prepared and then stored in some building, such as a farmer's barn days or weeks before being erected on 1 May. The young men from the villages try to steal the Maibaum from each other (out of the storage places) which is why the people of the village take turns in watching over it. If a village manages to steal a Maibaum, then the village the Maibaum has been stolen from has to invite the whole village of the thieves to free beer and a festivity to get it back.

Just before the Maibaum is erected, depending on the region, there may be a procession through the village, usually ending at a central place and/or restaurant and usually watched by crowds of spectators and accompanied by a brass band. The actual installation of the tree then takes place in the afternoon or evening. The maypole is traditionally set up with the help of long poles, today it may sometimes also be done using tractors, forklifts, or even cranes. In Lower Austria ropes and ladders are used.

If the communal tree is erected already on the eve of 1 May, then the event is usually followed by a May dance or Tanz in den Mai. Depending on local custom, the Maibaum may remain in place all year round or may be taken down at the end of May. The trunk may then be stored until the following year.

From the Rhineland in and around Cologne originates a somewhat different, private, maytree tradition. During the night before 1 May, traditionally unmarried men erect cut young birch trees, complete with their spring green foliage, often decorated with multicoloured satin (sometimes crepe paper) streamers, in front of the house of their sweetheart. (Sometimes, but rarely, additionally with a (heartshaped) sign bearing the name of the adored person. Normally the person who "is meant" (and neighbours etc.) is/are left to just guess/speculate about the identity of the involved.) These individual may trees can be spotted in other regions of the country, too, and even in urban environments where people sometimes have to get quite creative in finding a spot and way to fix them somewhere (as opposed to easier, traditional places with garden soil to just "plant" (stick) it in or fence posts to bind it to).

==== Hungary ====
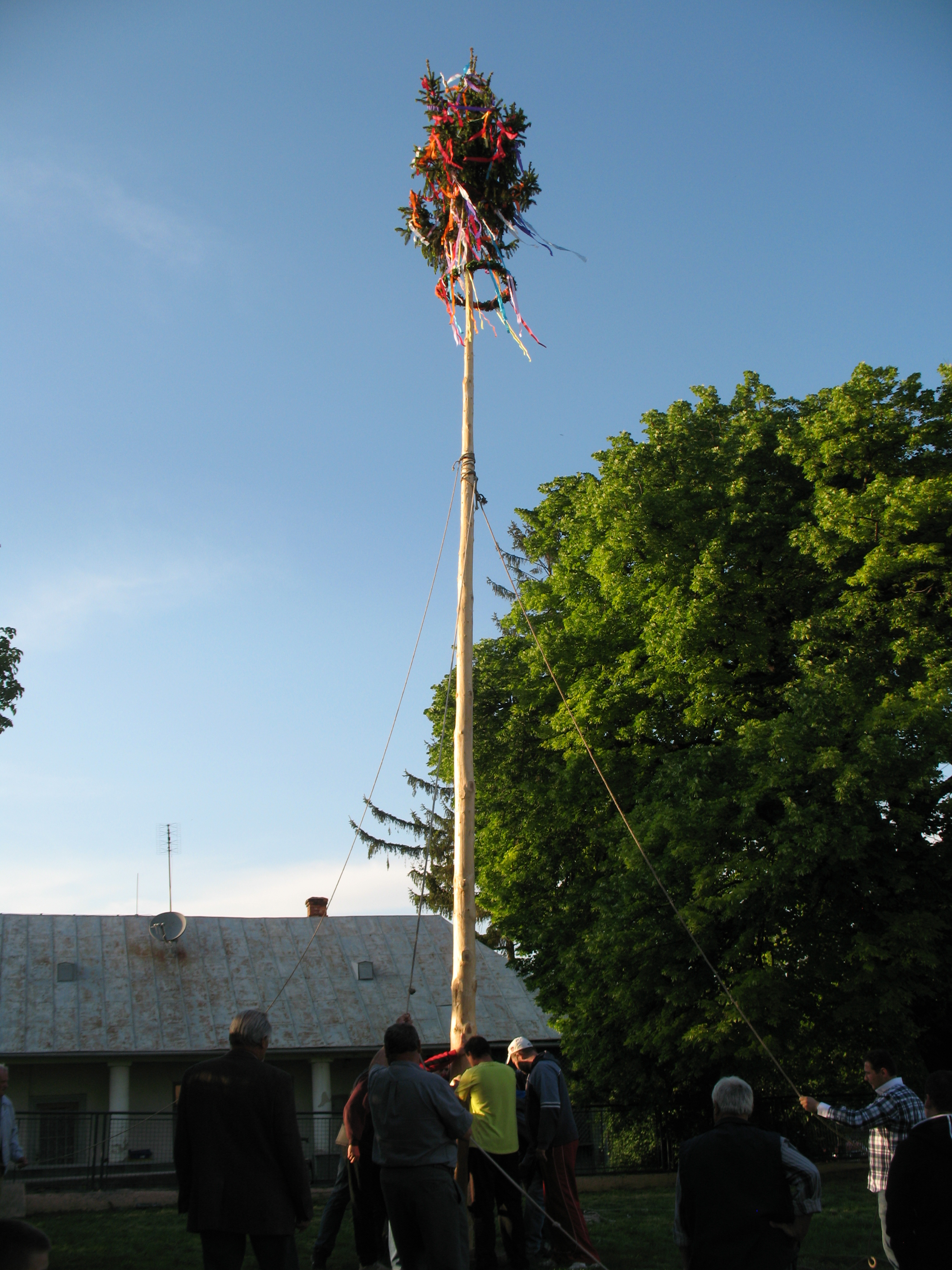
May Pole in Hungary. When the girl sees this, she lights three matches to show that she likes it.

In Hungary the common term is Májusfa. They were danced around and usually decorated with a full bottle of wine, with hímestojás, flowers and ribbons. May Poles and similar decorated branches, collectively called Zöld ágak were believed to have magical properties. All of them were often put up as an ornament to bring good luck and protect against witches' spells, since it was generally believed by the Hungarians that they can be protected against with different types of weed and herbs.

The base was a tall tree stripped of its bark, with the foliage left only at the top (usually 12–15 meters), but it could also be a smaller tree or a large, flowering, greenish branch. They also tried to personalise the trees, decorating them with small gifts, combs, mirrors but also thorny branches and rags, reflecting negative qualities.

Often it was only in front of the priest and judge's house that a tall May Pole was erected, but every girl had to have at least one branch. Usually each suitor would put one in the girl's garden. Often they would carve it out and write the boy's name on it. The cutting and wood delivery had to be done in secret, under the cover of night, so that the lady in question would not suspect anything. When the family saw the boys, if the girl liked the suitor, they invited them in to dinner and proudly left the tree in the garden.

In the morning, they compared who got the longer May Pole, and tried to guess who gave it to them and often, which envious lover has plucked the tree. Unlike other May Poles, in Hungary it was the length of the tree that mattered, which would ultimately convince the girls to go out with the men. This was a common form of rural flirting, similar to the Hajnalfa.

The lovers were always assisted by a (often drunken) courting team of similar boys. If two boys liked the same girl, after one team had erected the maypole, the other would secretly take it away and dig his own in its place.

On the last Sunday of May májusfa-kitáncolás, when they tore the pole down, while dancing one last time. The máj-kerék was placed on it that day, a wagon wheel on the end of a high pole, decorated with ribbons, wine bottles and linen scarves. Its placement was a metaphor for the fulfilment of a love affair. If the kitáncolás did not happen that meant, the boy has abandoned his courtship. The ornaments of the wheel were raced to be taken down by the men climbing up the pole. Often, however, they would play tricks on each other by putting water with paprika in a bottle on top of the tree instead of wine. The winner was declared the King of Pentecost, the Judge Stag or the First Stag. During the demolition, young people dressed merely in green branches collected a "ransom", all around the village.

In addition to the love May Poles, there were also community May Poles in front of churches and pubs, around which they had fun until the evening.

==== Italy ====
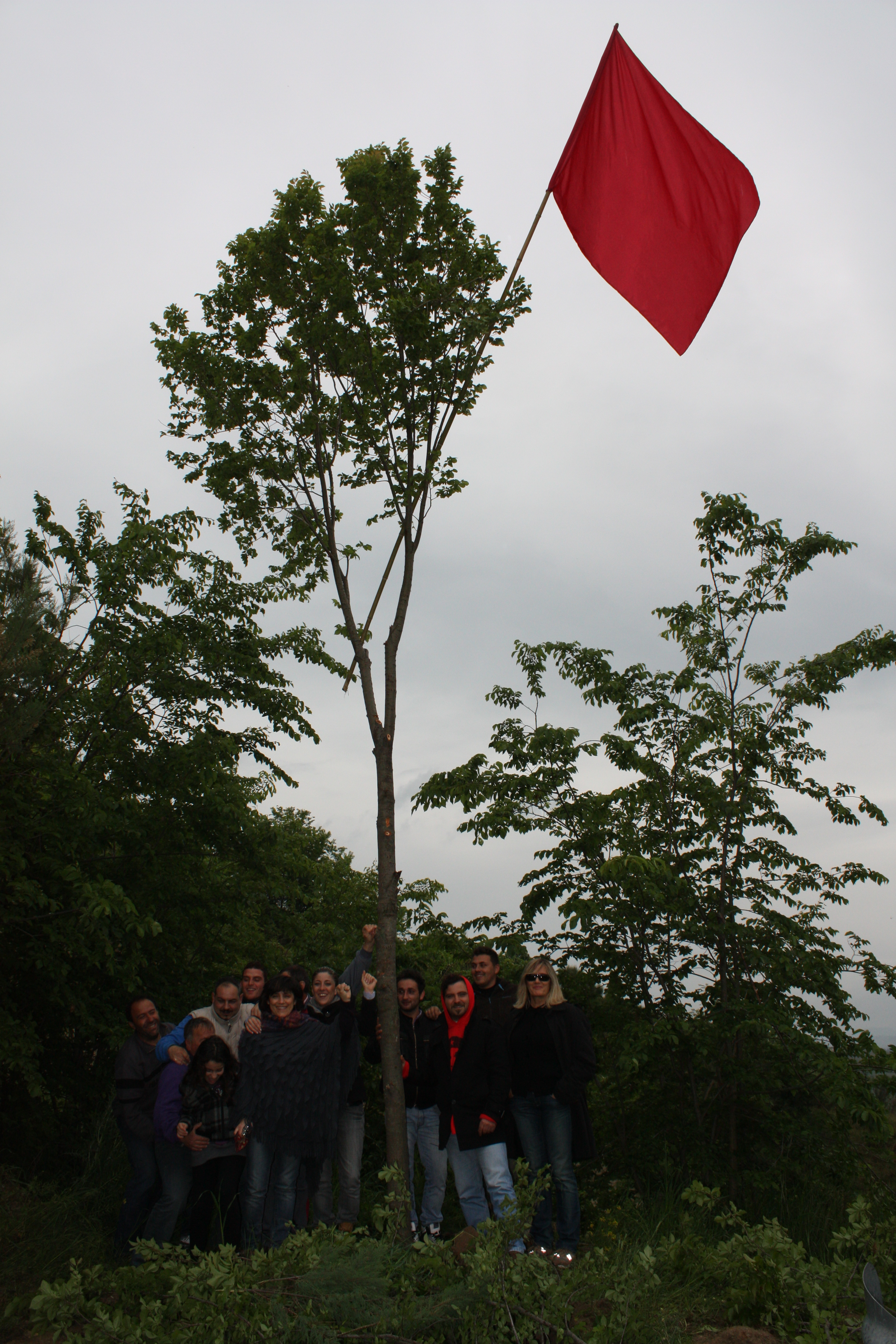
A traditional 'red' maypole in Ascoli Piceno, Italy

Maypole traditions can be found in some parts of Italy, such as in Veneto, Friuli, Umbria, and Marche. In the last of these regions, the tradition dates back to the Napoleonic campaigns, when the arbre de la liberté (Liberty tree), the symbol of the French Revolution, arrived in Italy. Liberty trees were erected in the southern part of the region in Ripatransone and Ascoli Piceno. In 1889, the first congress of the Second International, met in Paris for the centennial of the French Revolution and the Exposition Universelle. A proposal by Raymond Lavigne called for international demonstrations on the 1890 anniversary of the Chicago protests. After the institution of the International Workers' Day the maypole rite in the southern part of the March became a socialist ritual. At the top of the tree (poplar) appeared the red flag. In the second half of the 20th century, the rite of the maypole around Ascoli remained a rite of celebration of spring but it became also a political symbol of the peasant movement (mezzadri) that struggled against the landowners to have decent living conditions. Every year, even today, on the night of 30 April, in many villages of the zone like Appignano del Tronto, Arquata del Tronto, Ascoli Piceno, Castorano, Castignano, Castel di Lama, Colli del Tronto, Grottammare, Monsampolo del Tronto, Porchia (Montalto Marche), Monteprandone, Offida, Rotella, Spinetoli, San Benedetto del Tronto, citizens cut a poplar on which they put-up a red flag and the tree is erected in village squares or at crossroads.

After we've gone to get the pole in thirty or forty people, we placed it like a six-month child. We walked in procession with this tree and not even a single leaf had to touch the ground. We had to raise it without making it touch the ground, holding it in our arms like a child. For us it was the saint of the 1st of May

— Quirino Marchetti (ancient peasant of San Benedetto del Tronto),

The same ritual is known from Lamon, a village in the Dolomites in Veneto, which likely predates the Napoleonic period. Here, a number of quarters and hamlets erect a maypole in the form of a larch whose branches and bark are almost completely removed. Only the top branches are left. A red flag is normally attached, although Italian flags or flags of other countries (Colombia, Bolivia for example) or artists (Bob Marley) are also attested. Around the maypole, quarters and hamlets give feasts with music, food, and alcohol which usually last until the dawn of 1 May. The Maypole is locally called 'Majo' (May in the local dialect).

==== Malta ====
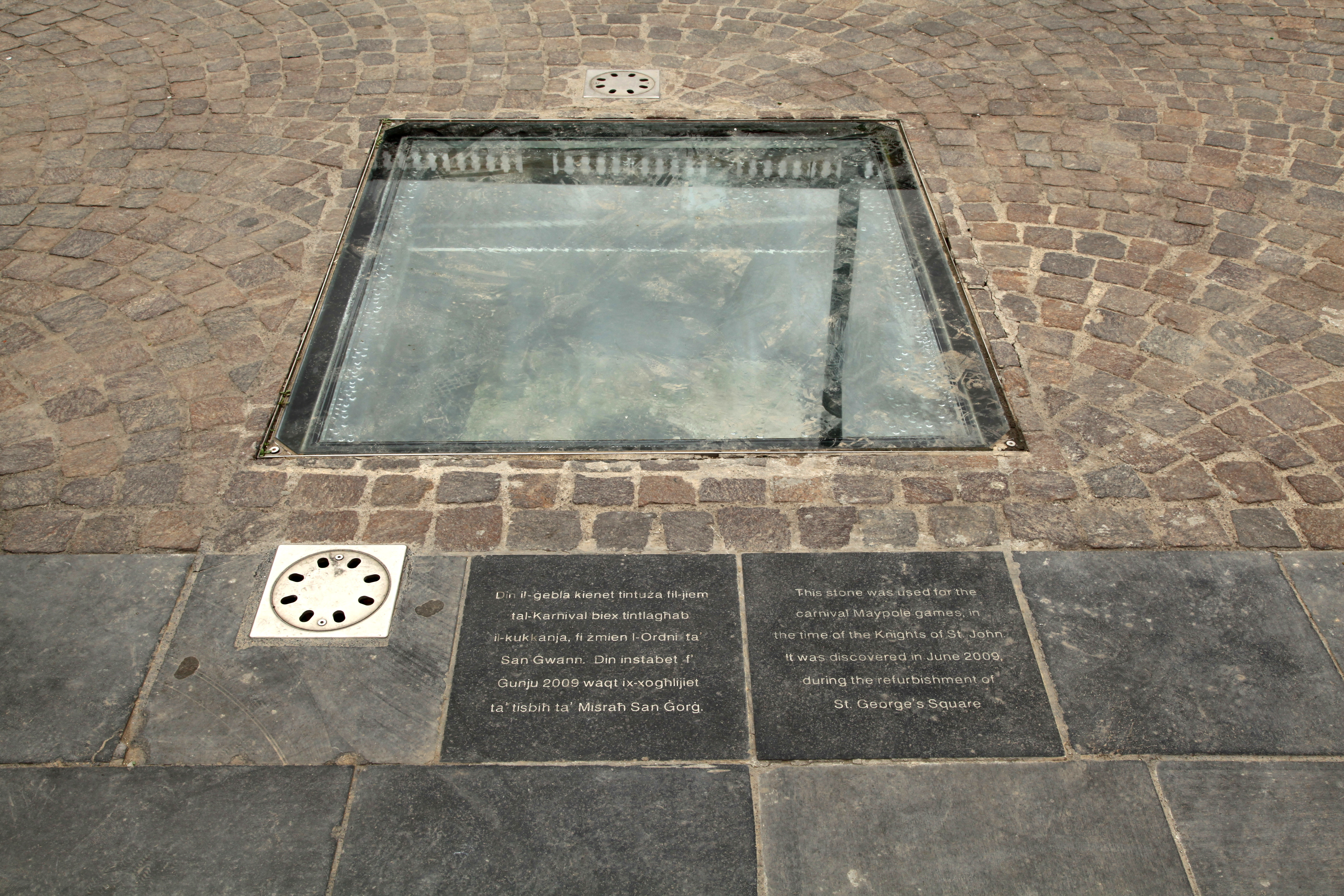
Remains of the kukkanja in situ in Valletta, Malta, in which the maypole was inserted

Grand Master Marc'Antonio Zondadari introduced the game of cockaigne (with the use of the maypole) to Maltese Carnival in 1721: on a given signal, the crowd assembled in Palace Square and converged on a collection of hams, sausages and live animals hidden beneath leafy branches outside the Main Guard. The provisions became the property of those who, having seized them, were able to carry them off.

==== Nordic countries ====
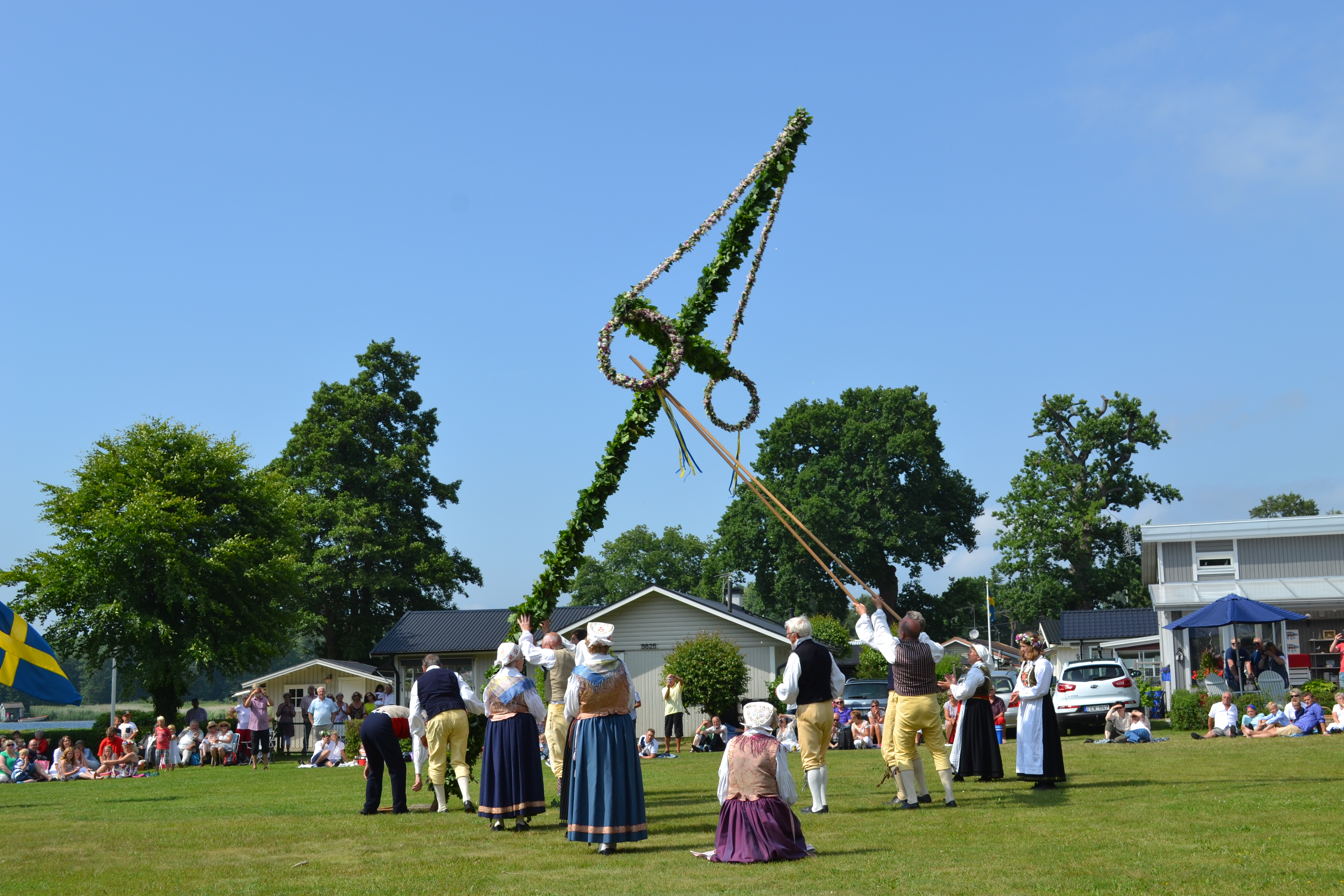
Erection of midsommarstång, Sölvesborg, Sweden

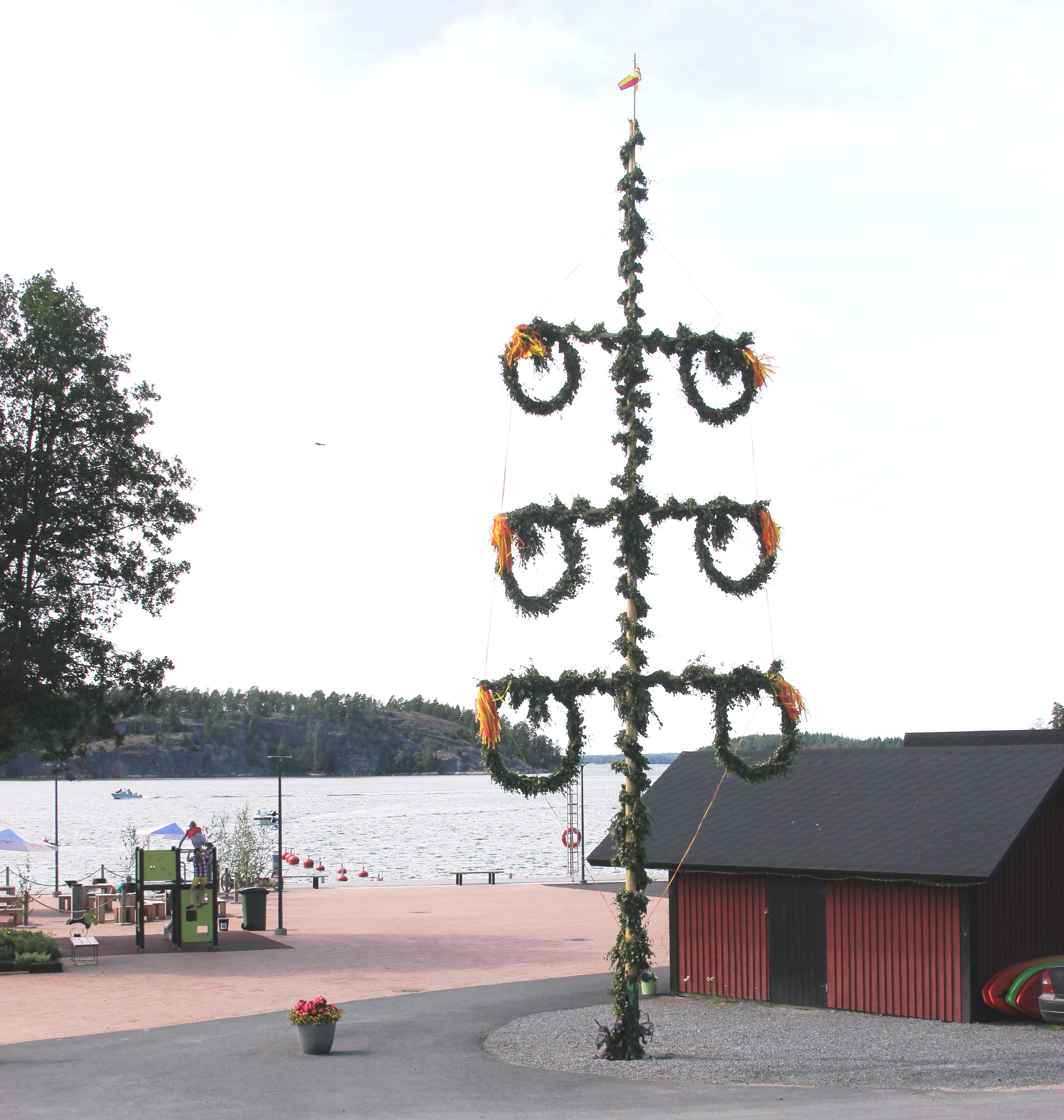
A midsummer pole at harbour in Bromarv, Finland

In Denmark, the maypole tradition is almost extinct but is still observed on the islands of Avernakø and Strynø south of Funen and in a few villages in southern Himmerland in eastern Jutland. The Maypole is generally referred to as a majtræ, meaning "May tree".

In Sweden and Swedish-speaking parts of Finland, the maypole is usually called a midsummer pole, (midsommarstång), as it appears at the Midsummer celebrations, although the literal translation majstång also occurs, where the word maj refers to the Old Swedish word maja which means dress, and not the month of May, but originally does also the Swedish word Maj come from the month of May. The traditions surrounding the maypoles vary locally, as does the design of the poles, although the design featuring a cross and two rings is most common in Sweden nowadays. A perhaps more original incarnation is the one still in use in the Swedish region of Småland, where the pole carries a large horizontally suspended ring around it, hanging from ropes attached at the top of the pole. A widespread misconception is that the maypole represents a phallic symbol and a remnant of ancient fertility worship. Instead it's related to the harsh conditions of peasant society where magic was more a way to master the unpredictability of existence. Nowadays Midsummer traditions are joyful family events to celebrate the summer and the long bright days, and less about deeper meanings or religion. The pole is raised in many public places in cities and towns, where everyone is welcome to participate in the events.

Common in all of Sweden are traditional ring dances, mostly in the form of dances where participants alternate dancing and making movements and gestures based on the songs, such as pretending to scrub laundry while singing about washing, or jumping as frogs during the song Små grodorna ("The little frogs"). Often led by a live orchestra and singers. Ring dancing is mostly popular with small children. The central part played by young children in the celebration emphasizes the procreation aspect of the celebration. Yet another pointer in this direction is the custom that young maidens expect to dream of their future mate if they pick seven different flowers and place them under their pillow when they go to bed on this day only, according to folklore.

==== United Kingdom ====
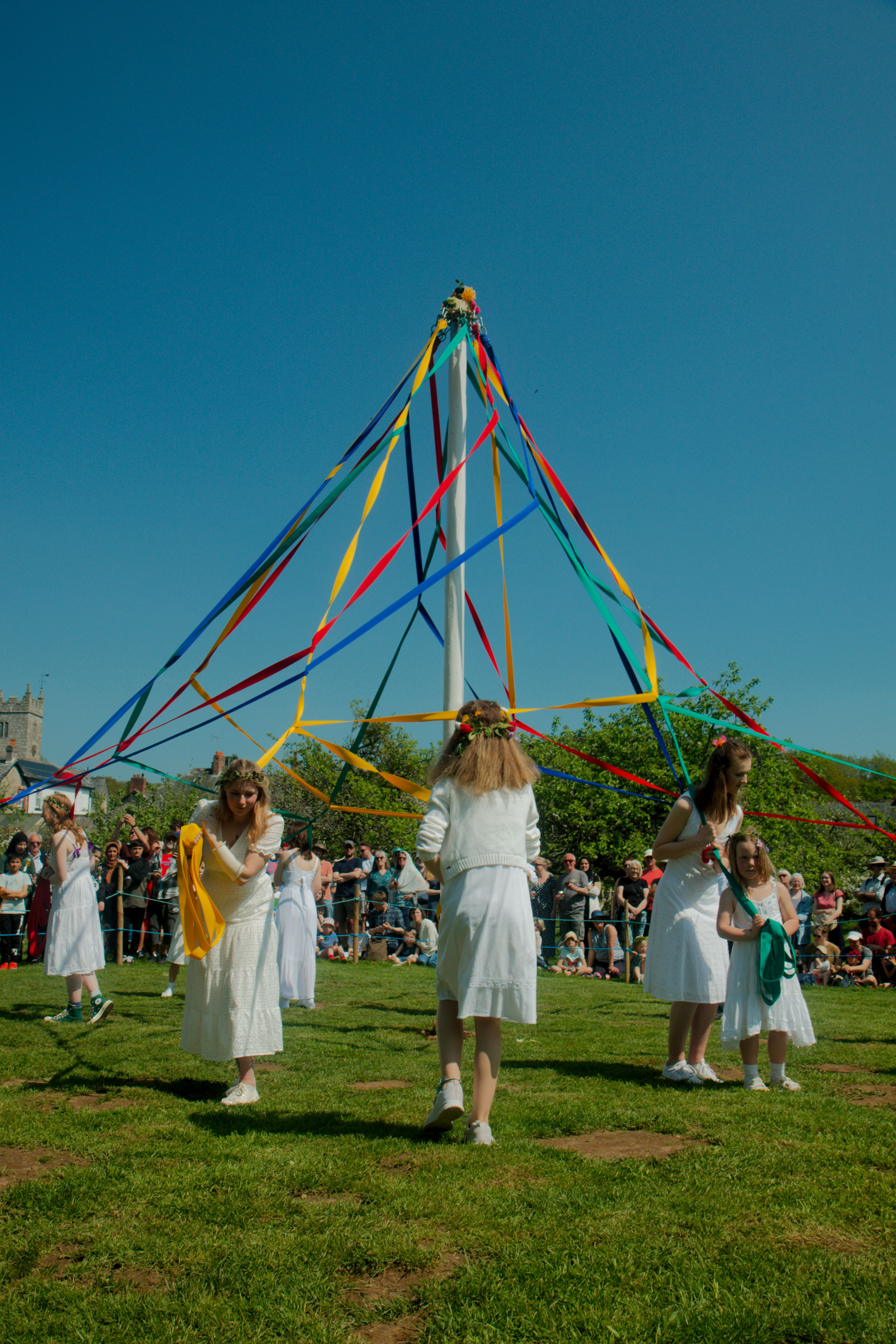
Maypole in Lustleigh, Devon, United Kingdom, in "spider's web" pattern

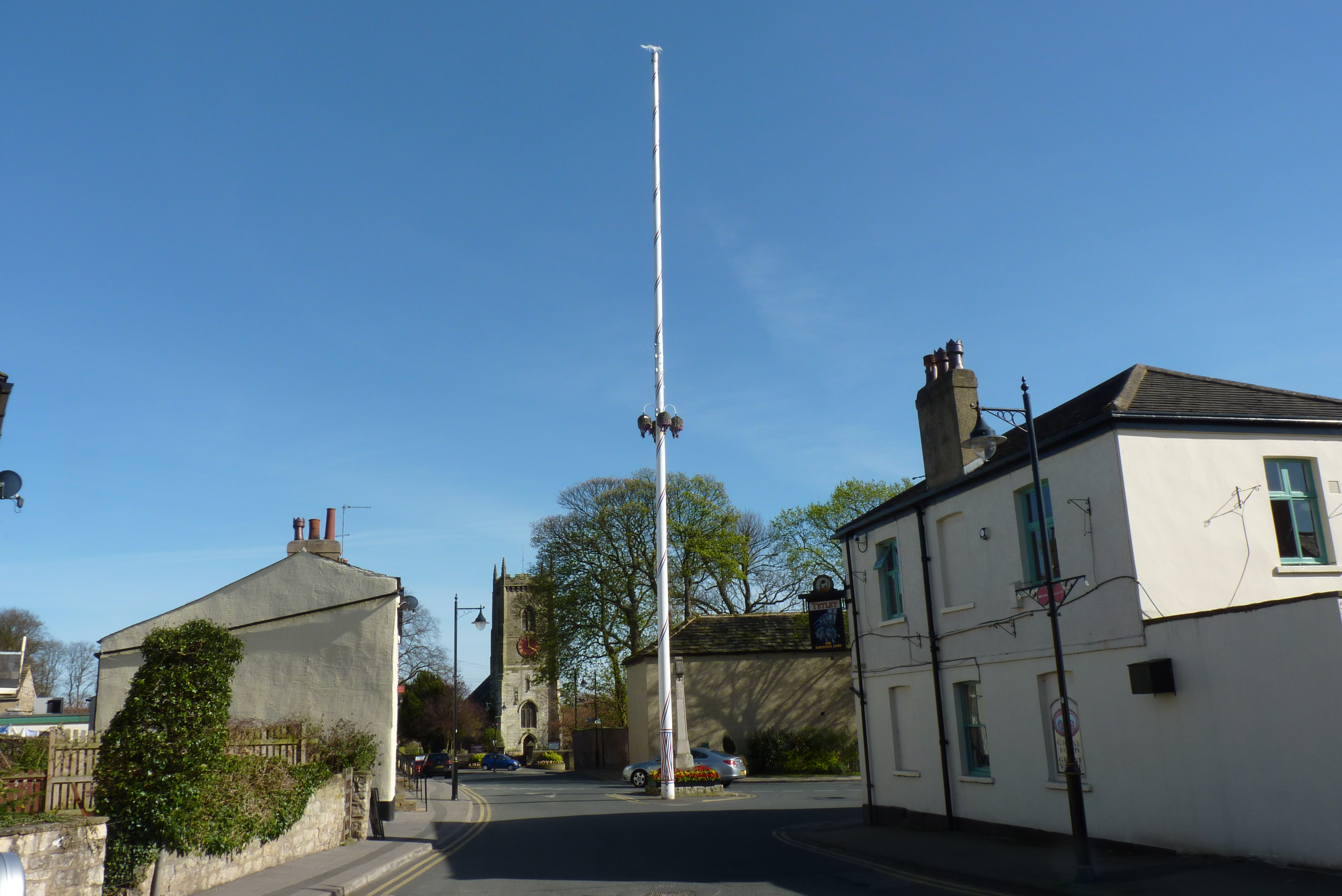
The maypole at Barwick-in-Elmet, Yorkshire, United Kingdom, which is lowered, refurbished, and raised every three years

In the United Kingdom, the maypole was found primarily in England and the Scottish Lowlands and Wales. However, the earliest recorded evidence comes from a Welsh poem written by Gryffydd ap Adda ap Dafydd in the mid-14th century, in which he described how people used a tall birch pole at Llanidloes, central Wales. Literary evidence for maypole use across much of Britain increases in later decades, and "by the period 1350–1400 the custom was well established across southern Britain, in town and country and in both Welsh-speaking and English-speaking areas."

The practice became increasingly popular throughout the ensuing centuries, with the maypoles becoming "communal symbols" that brought the local community together – in some cases, poorer parishes would join up with neighboring ones in order to obtain and erect one, whilst in other cases, such as in Hertfordshire in 1602 and Warwickshire in 1639, people stole the poles of neighboring communities, leading to violence. In some cases the wood for the pole was obtained illegally, for instance in 1603, the earl of Huntingdon was angered when trees were removed from his estates for use as maypoles without his permission.

The rise of Protestantism in the 16th century led to increasing disapproval of maypoles and other May Day practices from various Protestants who viewed them as idolatry and therefore immoral. Under the reign of Edward VI in England and Wales, Protestant Anglicanism was declared to be the state religion, and under the Reformation many maypoles, such as the famous Cornhill maypole of London, were destroyed; however when Mary I ascended the throne after Edward's death, she reinstated Roman Catholicism as the state faith, and the practice of maypoles was reinstated. Under later English monarchs, the practice was sporadic, being banned in certain areas, such as Doncaster, Canterbury, and Bristol, but continuing in many others, according to the wishes of the local governors. In Scotland meanwhile, which at this time was still an independent state, Protestantism, in the form of Presbyterianism, had taken a more powerful hold, and largely wiped out the practice of maypoles across the country.

Royal support contributed to the outlawing of maypole displays and dancing during the English Interregnum. The Long Parliament's ordinance of 1644 described maypoles as "a Heathenish vanity, generally abused to superstition and wickedness." The only recorded breach of the Long Parliament's prohibition was in 1655 in Henley-in-Arden, where local officials stopped the erection of maypoles for traditional games. Scholars suspect but have no way to prove, that the lack of such records indicates official connivance in the flouting of the prohibition. However, they are certain that the prohibition turned maypole dancing into a symbol of resistance to the Long Parliament and to the republic that followed it.

The church of St Andrew Undershaft in the City of London is named after the maypole that was kept under its eaves and set up each spring until 1517 when student riots put an end to the custom. The maypole itself survived until 1547 when a Puritan mob seized and destroyed it as a "pagan idol".

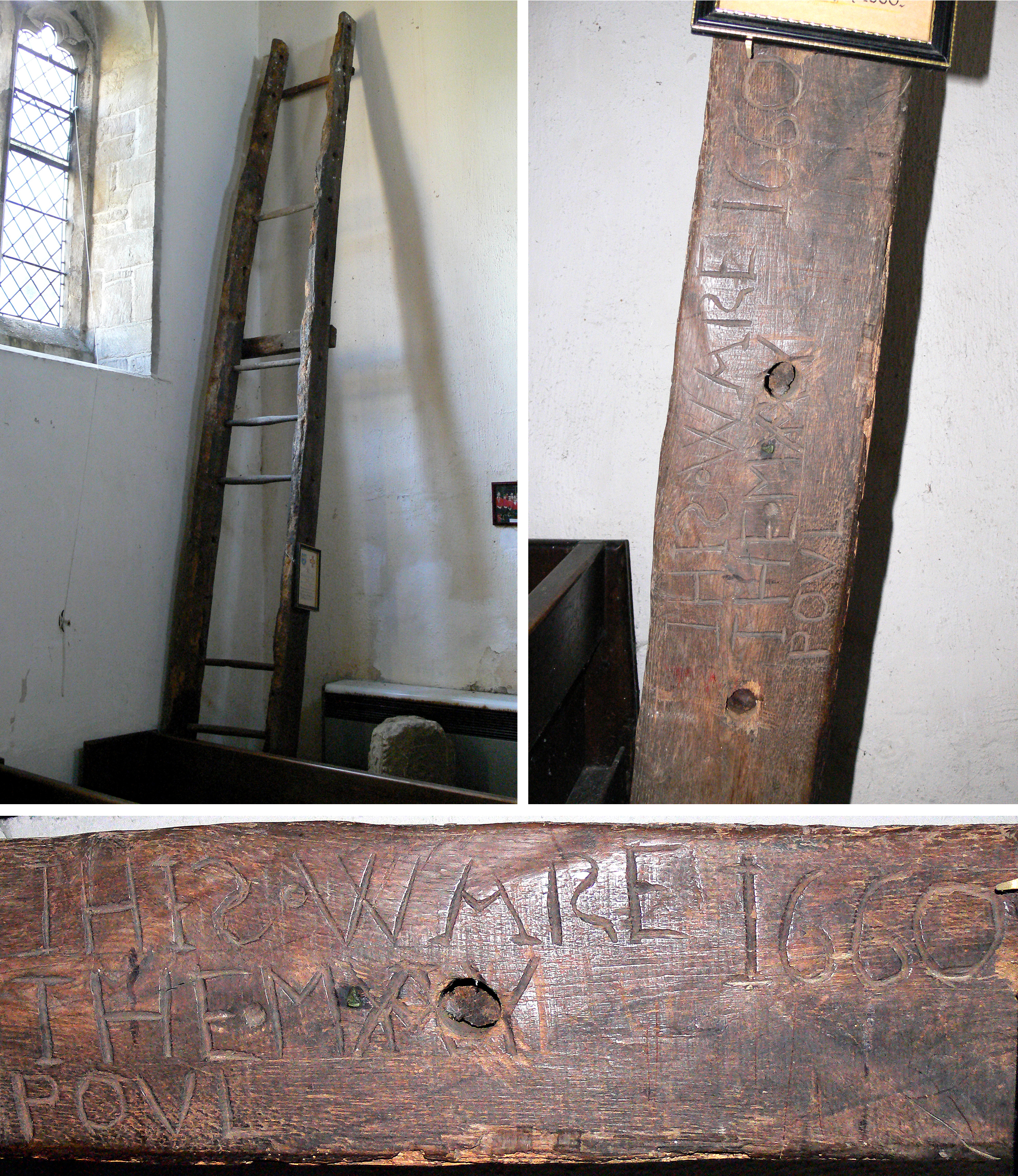
May Day celebrations, banned under the Commonwealth, were revived in 1660. The maypole at Castle Bytham, Lincolnshire, was inscribed to commemorate the date when it was later cut in half for use as a ladder.

When the Restoration occurred in 1660, common people in London, in particular, put up maypoles "at every crossway", according to John Aubrey. The largest was the Maypole in the Strand, near the current St Mary-le-Strand church. The maypole there was the tallest by far, reaching over 130 feet (40 m), and it stood until being blown over by a high wind in 1672 when it was moved to Wanstead in Essex and served as a mount for the telescope of Sir Isaac Newton.

In the countryside, may dances and maypoles appeared sporadically even during the Interregnum, but the practice was revived substantially after the Restoration. By the 19th century, the maypole had been subsumed into the symbology of "Merry England". The addition of intertwining ribbons seems to have been influenced by a combination of 19th-century theatrical fashion (Note: Folklorist D. R. Rowe refers to the practice as starting on 28 November 1836 at the Victoria Theatre, London. A contemporary theatre review refers to the performance on that night, in a melodrama, of 'a novel and excellent dance around the maypole'.) and visionary individuals such as John Ruskin in the 19th century. However, the maypole remained an anti-religious symbol to some theologians, as shown by "The Two Babylons", an anti-Catholic conspiracist pamphlet that first appeared in 1853.

As revived, the dance is performed by pairs of boys and girls (or men and women) who stand alternately around the base of the pole, each holding the end of a ribbon. They weave in and around each other, boys going one way and girls going the other and the ribbons are woven together around the pole until they meet at the base. There are also more complex dances for set numbers of (practiced) dancers (the May Queen dancing troupes) involving complicated weaves and unweaves, but they are not well known today. However, such dances are performed every Mayday around the permanent Maypole at Offenham, in Worcestershire. Temporary Maypoles are usually erected on village greens and events are often supervised by local Morris dancing groups.

In some regions, a somewhat different Maypole tradition existed: the carrying of highly decorated sticks. The sticks had hoops or cross-sticks or swags attached, covered with flowers, greenery, or artificial materials such as crepe paper. Children would take these hand-held poles to school on May Day morning and prizes may be awarded for the most impressive. This tradition is known as garlanding and was a central feature of Mayday celebrations in central and southern England until the mid-19th century. After that time, it began to be replaced by formally organized school-centered celebrations. It still occurs from place to place but is invariably a reinstatement of a local custom that had lapsed decades earlier.

In 1780, Kilmarnock Council, now in East Ayrshire, paid Robert Fraser 2s. 6d. for "dressing a Maypole", one of the last recorded examples of the rural festival of the first of May in Scotland, having been put down by Act of Parliament immediately after the Reformation in 1560.

The tallest maypoles in Britain may be found in the villages of Nun Monkton, North Yorkshire (27 metres or 88 feet 5 1/4 inches), Barwick-in-Elmet, West Yorkshire (26 metres or 86 feet), Welford-on-Avon, Warwickshire (20 metres or 65 feet) and Paganhill, Gloucestershire (18 metres or 60 feet; although a taller, post-WWI 'Memorial Pole' of 29.5 m or 97 ft was previously erected in 1919, making it one of the tallest on record).

Holywood in County Down, Northern Ireland has a maypole situated at the crossroads of Main Street and Shore Road/Church Road in the center of the town. It is the only Maypole in Ireland. Although the origin is uncertain, it is thought that the original maypole dates from the 18th century, when a Dutch ship ran aground offshore. The latest maypole was damaged and removed after a storm in February 2021. The remains were removed by Ards and North Down Borough Council and a replacement pole was ordered.

=== America ===
==== Canada ====
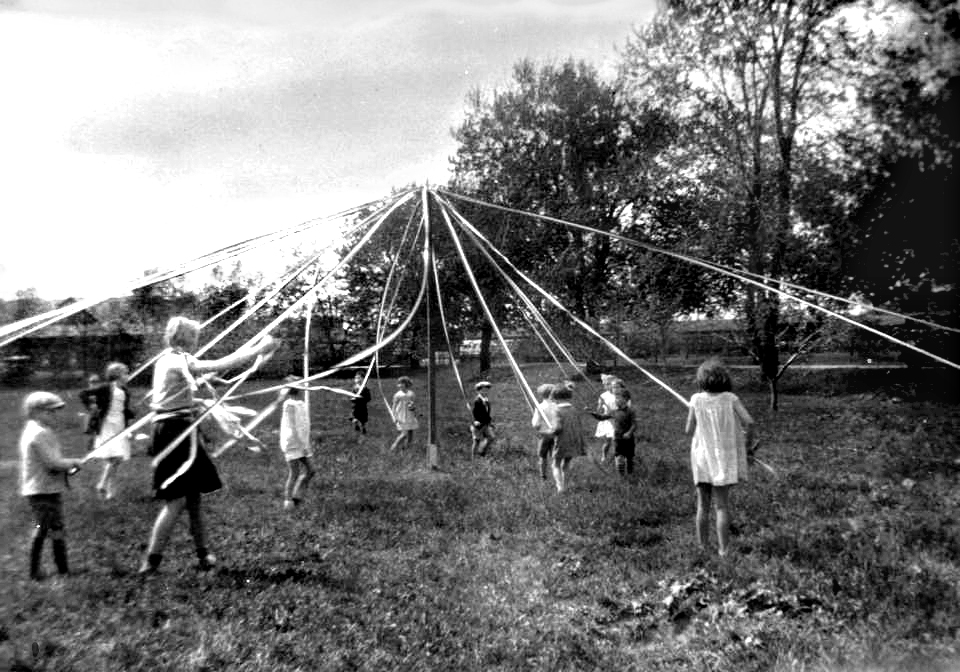
Maypole dance during Victoria Day in Quebec, Canada, 24 May 1934

In Canada, maypole dances are sometimes done as part of Victoria Day celebrations which occur in May. In New Westminster, British Columbia, dancing around the maypole and May Day celebrations have been held for 149 years.

==== United States ====
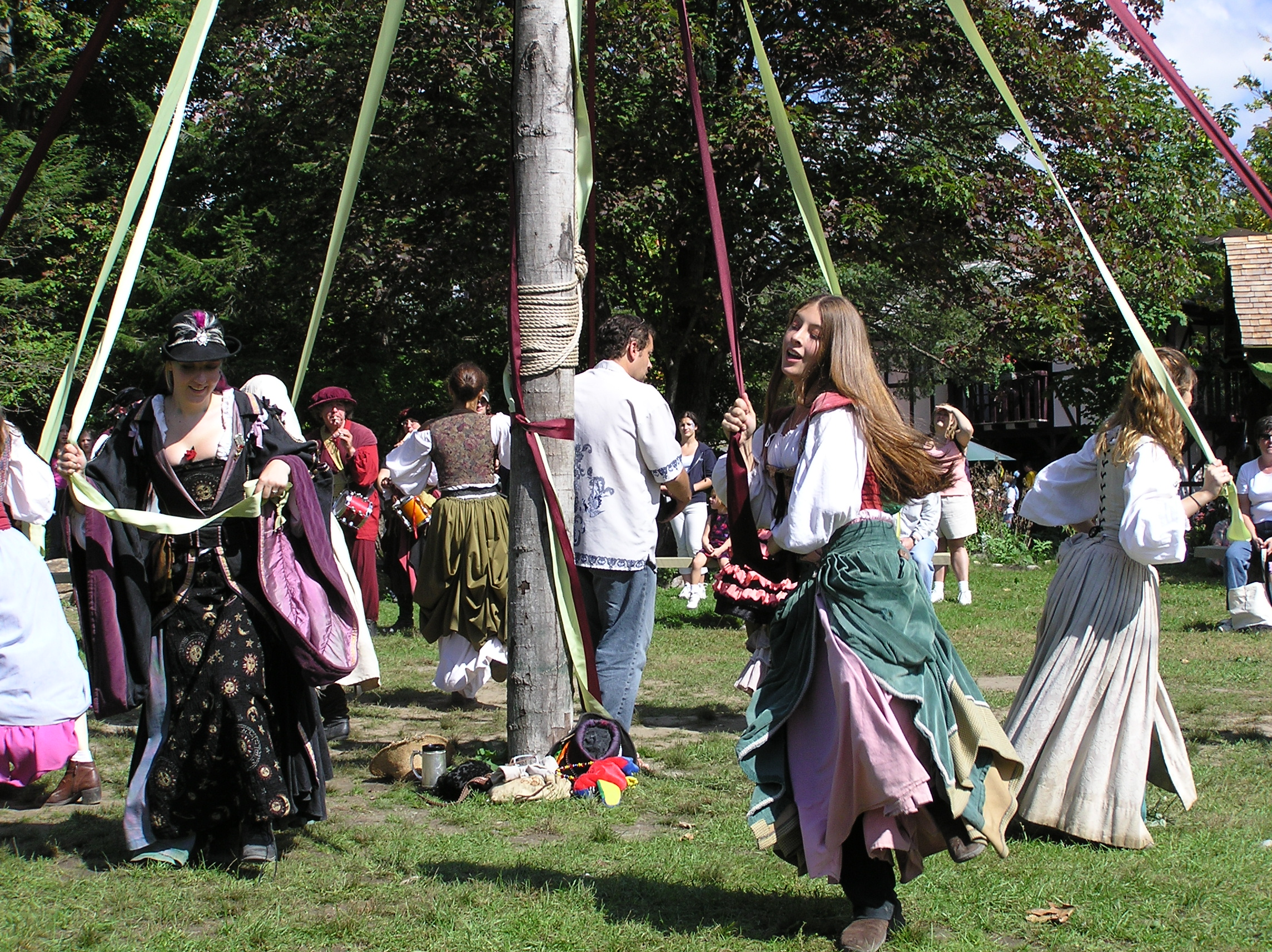
A maypole at a Renaissance faire in Tuxedo Park, United States

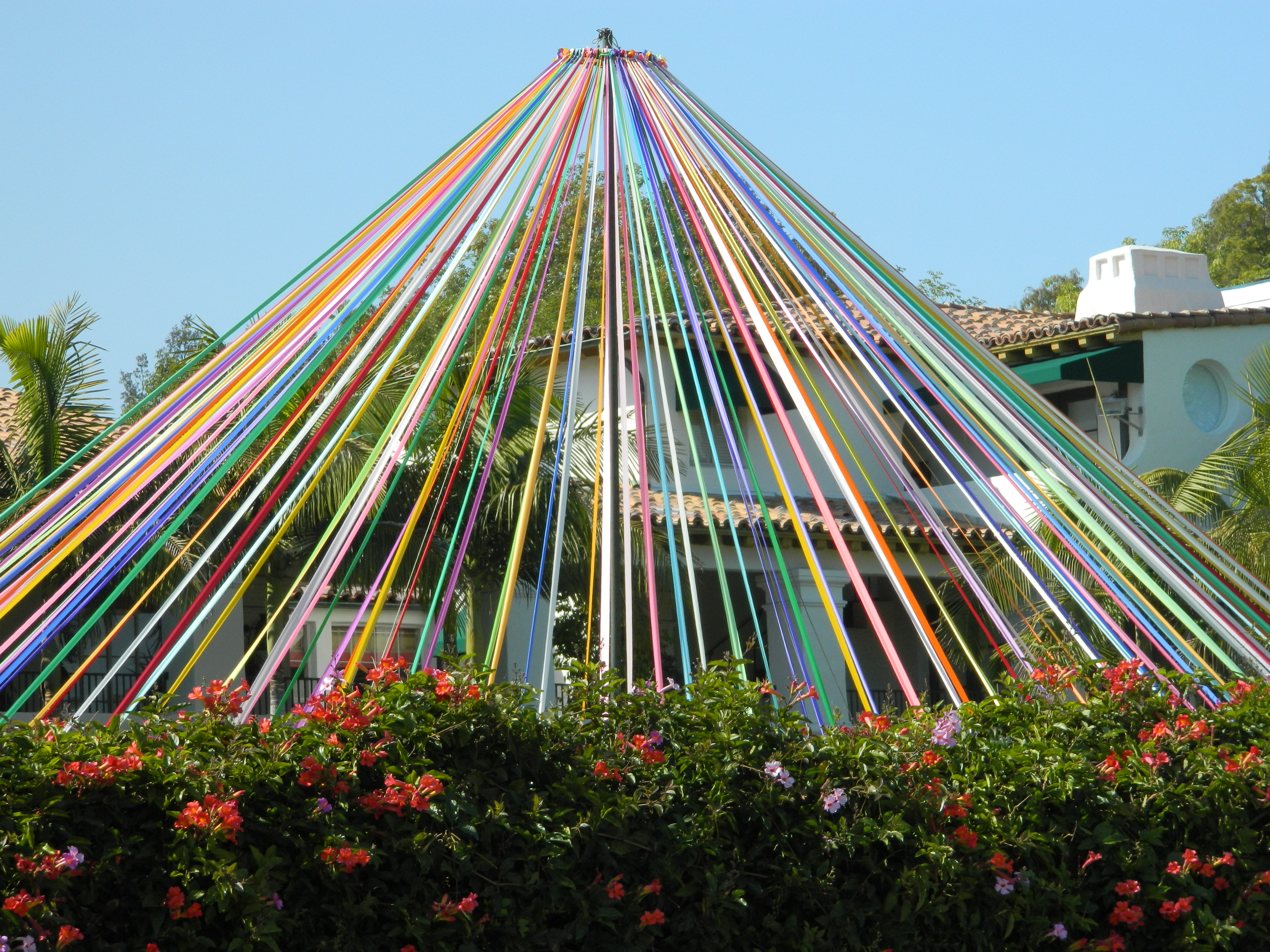
The Brentwood Maypole tradition originated when Archer School for Girls was still the Eastern Star Home.

While not celebrated among the general public in the United States today, a Maypole dance nearly identical to that celebrated in the United Kingdom is an important part of May Day celebrations in local schools and communities. Often the Maypole dance will be accompanied by other dances as part of a presentation to the public.

The earliest use of the Maypole in America occurred in 1628, when a number of indentured servants, led by Thomas Morton, broke free from their indentured service to create their own colony, setting up a maypole in the center of the settlement, and behaving in such a way as to receive the scorn and disapproval of the nearby colonies, as well as an officer of the king, bearing patent for the state of Massachusetts. William Bradford, governor of New Plymouth, described the event:

They also set up a May-pole, drinking and dancing about it many days together, inviting the Indian women, for their consorts, dancing and frisking together, (like so many fairies, or furies rather,) and worse practices. As if they had a new revived & celebrated the feasts of the Roman Goddess Flora, or the beastly practices of the madd Bacchinalians. Morton likewise (to shew his poetry) composed sundry rimes & verses, some tending to lasciviousness, and others to the detraction & scandal of some persons, which he affixed to this idle or idol May-pole. They changed also the name of their place, and instead of calling it Mount Wollaston, they call it Merie-mounted, as if this jollity would have lasted ever. But this continued not long, for after Morton was sent for England, shortly after came over that worthy gentleman, Mr. John Indecott, who brought a patent under the broad seal, for the government of Massachusetts, who visiting those parts caused the May-pole to be cutt downe, and rebuked them for their profanes, and admonished them to look there should be better walking; so they now, or others, changed the name of their place again, and called it Mount-Dagon.

Governor Bradford's censure of the Maypole tradition played a central role in Nathaniel Hawthorne's fictional story "The Maypole of Merry Mount", published in 1837.

New York City's Central Park also has a history of the Maypole, with the practice being particularly popular in the early 20th century. Photographs from the early to mid 1900s depict children participating in Maypole dances, which suggest that dances and tradition like these were common in the park at that time. Maypoles can also be seen in artwork from this time. Artist Maurice Prendergast depicted children dancing around the Maypole in his 1901 watercolor painting "May Day, Central Park." However, by the mid-20th century the popularity of May Day celebrations in Central Park had declined and the focus of May Day shifted towards political demonstrations. It has become an annual tradition for workers from different backgrounds and occupations to march from Washington Square Park to Foley Square on May 1 to protest in support of workers' rights.

== Educational and cultural preservation efforts ==
In Colonial Williamsburg, Virginia, Maypole dancing is featured during spring events to teach children and tourists about European settlers' customs.

Cornland School in Chesapeake, Virginia transformed the old schoolhouse structure to be a historic museum, into an African American history museum. The museum's opening was marked by a Maypole celebration, a traditional festivity symbolizing community unity and cultural heritage. This event highlighted the museum's dedication to preserving and celebrating African American history and traditions.

== Pagan and Wiccan traditions ==
In Modern Paganism and Wicca, Maypoles are central to Beltane celebrations (April 30- May 1). Contemporary Wiccan and Pagan communities still continue to celebrate the Maypole as a central part of their Beltane celebration, as it symbolizes fertility, unity, and the energy of spring. It is a significant celebration in the community, as it marks the midpoint between the spring equinox and the summer solstice. It symbolizes the fertility of the land, the blossoming of life, and participants dance around the Maypole to symbolize the intertwining between masculine and feminine energy.

Many modern Pagan communities who follow the Celtic calendar organize public Beltane events featuring Maypole dances, bonfires, and feasting. These gatherings provide an opportunity for communal celebration, education, and the preservation of Pagan traditions.

In Wiccan traditions, the Maypole is often viewed as a phallic symbol, representing the God, while the ribbons and the circular dance represent the Goddess. The weaving of ribbons signifies the union of these divine aspects, embodying fertility and the creative forces of nature. This ritual not only honors deities but also serves as a communal activity that strengthens bonds among participants.

== In literature ==
Poet Jonathan Swift in his poem "A Maypole" describes a maypole as:

Deprived of root, and branch, and rind,
Yet flowers I bear of every kind:
And such is my prolific power,
They bloom in less than half an hour;

"The May-Pole of Merry Mount" is a short story by Nathaniel Hawthorne. It first appeared in The Token and Atlantic Souvenir in 1836. The story revolves around a young couple feeling the influence of nature who get betrothed in the presence of a Maypole and face Puritan ire. Hawthorne based his story on events in colonial New England history, borrowing from a story of Thomas Mortan whose settlement opposed the rigid cultural and religious standards of the Plymouth colony Puritans.

== In film ==
The Maypole is depicted in the film Midsommar, which sparked cultural discussions about European folk traditions and their symbolism. Despite the film's dark tone, it renewed mainstream interest in Maypole dancing and folk rituals. In this horror film, the Maypole is central to the plot, with a significant scene depicting a traditional Maypole dance set to the Swedish folk song "Hårgalåten."

The 1973 British horror film The Wicker Man features a scene where villagers perform a Maypole dance, singing "The Maypole Song," which underscores the film's exploration of pagan rituals.

== In art ==
The maypole has also been featured in various cultural depictions, including magazine covers. For instance, the May 1, 1923, cover of Vanity Fair, illustrated by Rockwell Kent, showcases a couple dancing around a maypole at a carnival. Similarly, The New Yorker has featured maypole imagery on its covers. The May 3, 1941, issue, with artwork by Ilonka Karasz, depicts a floral maypole scene, reflecting the seasonal celebration.

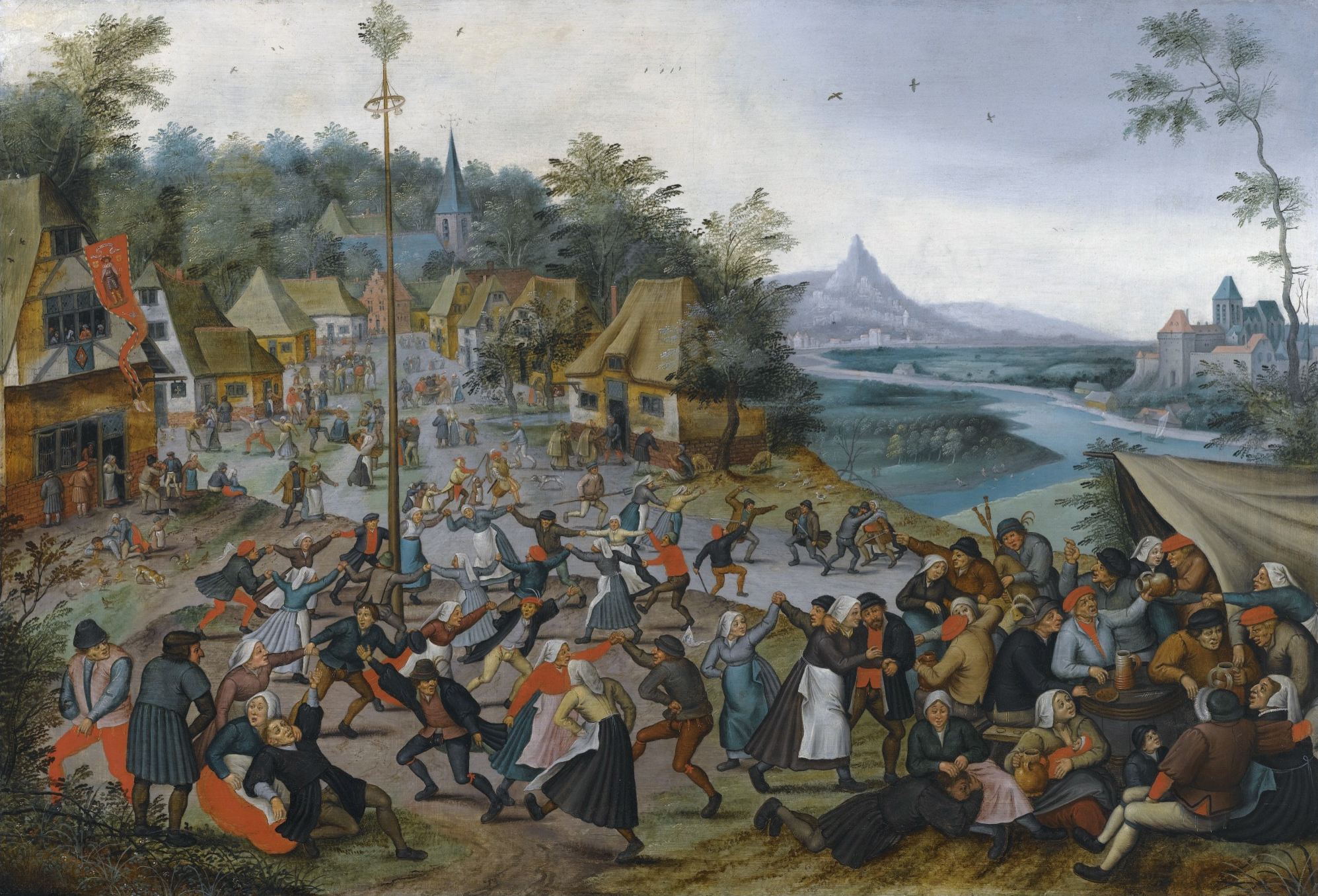
Dance around the Maypole, by Pieter Brueghel the Younger, 16th century

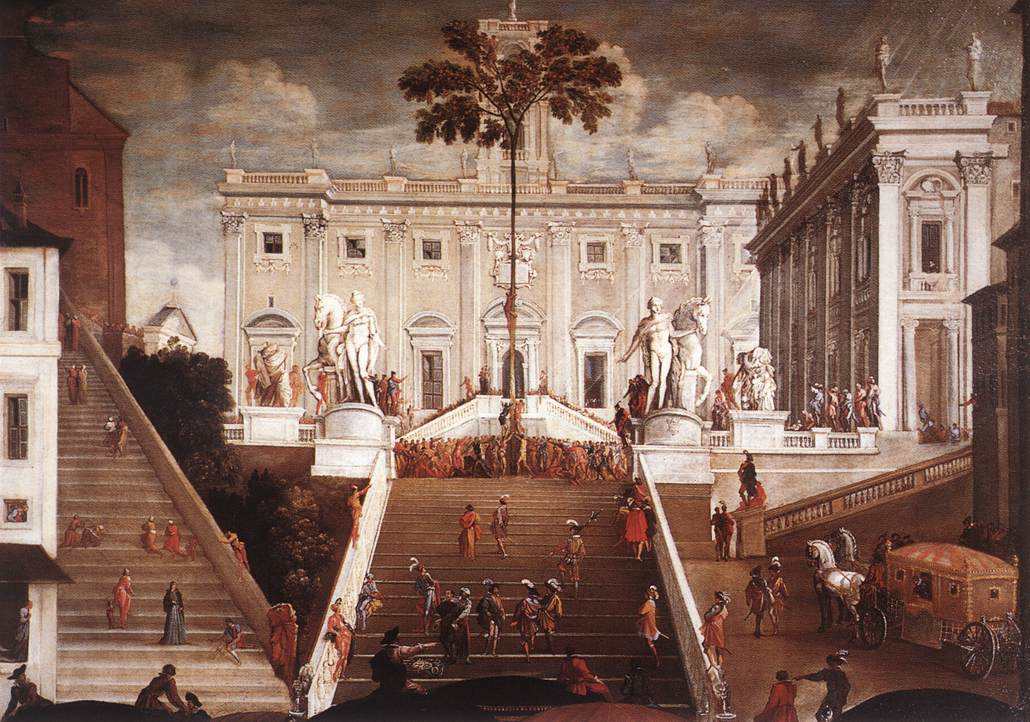
Maypole on the Capitoline Hill in Rome, Agostino Tassi, 1630

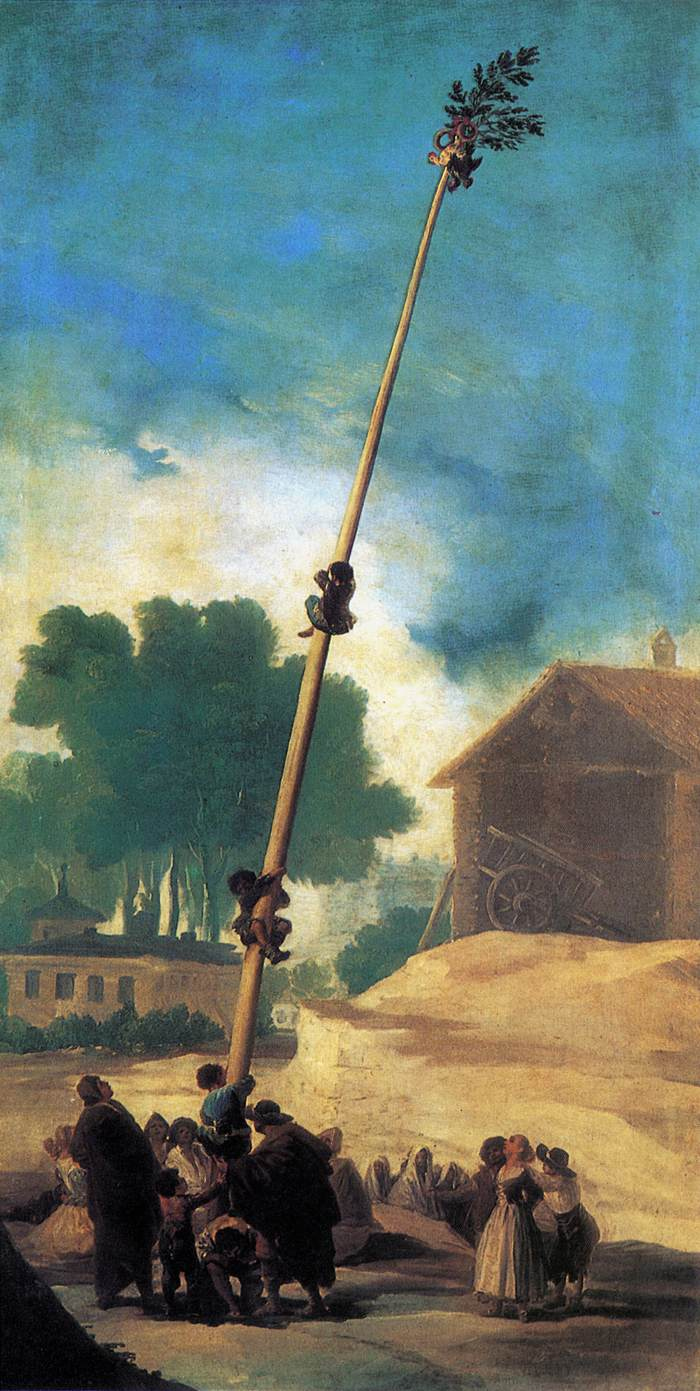
La Cucaña (The Tree of Cockaigne or The Greased Climbing Pole), Francisco Goya, 1786–87

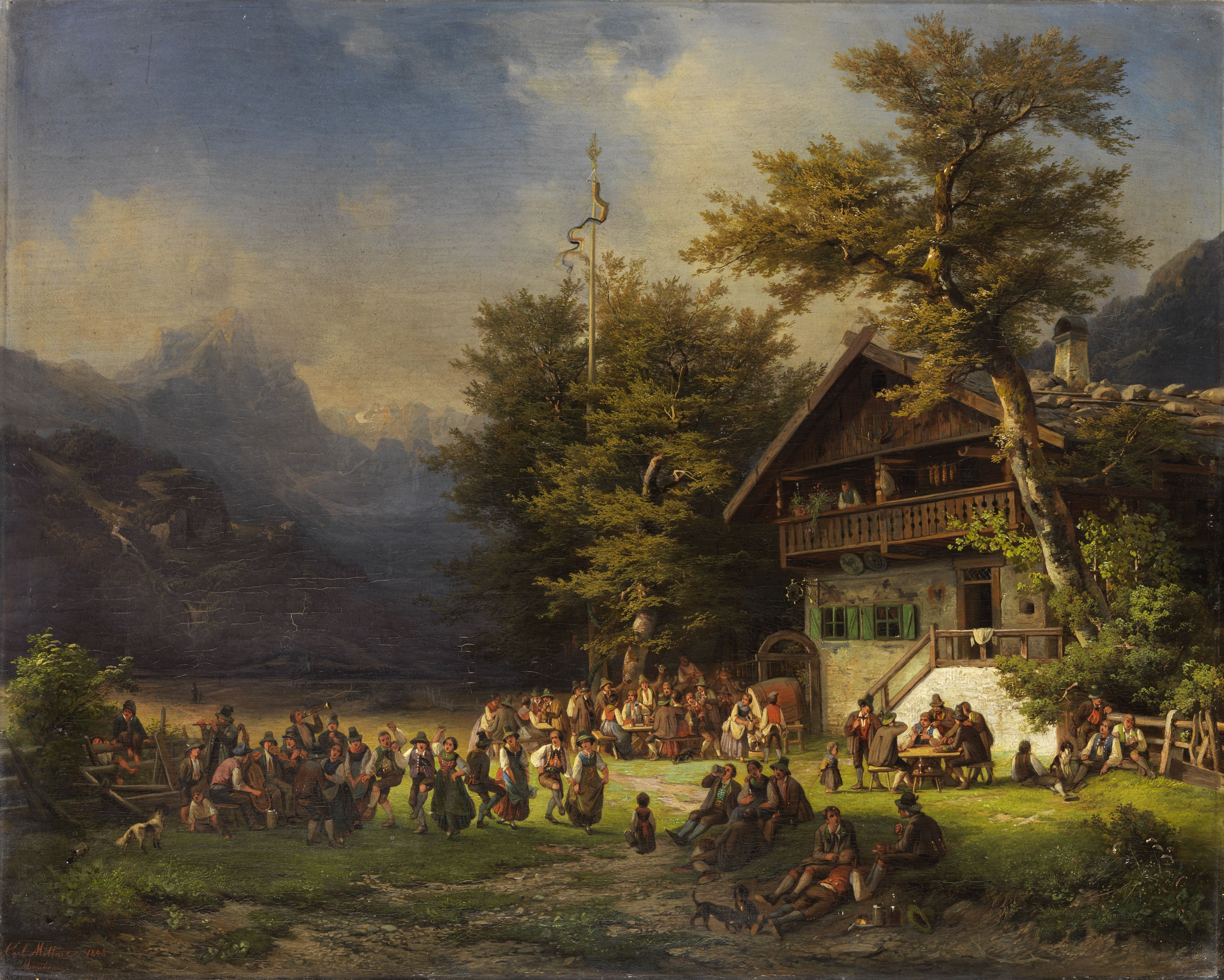
Maypole in Bavaria, 1848

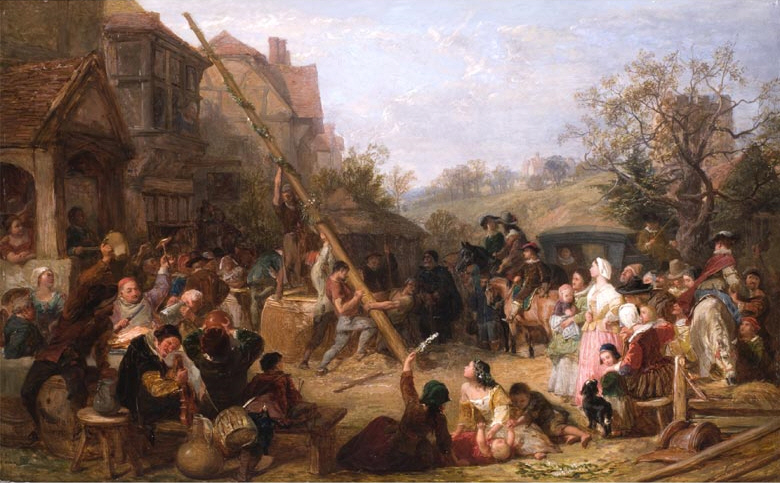
Raising the maypole, Frederick Goodall, 1855

== See also ==
- Axis Mundi
- Beltane
- Ceremonial pole
- Festivus § Festivus pole
- Sacred trees and groves in Germanic paganism and mythology
- Walpurgis night
