= Små grodorna =

Swedish dance and song

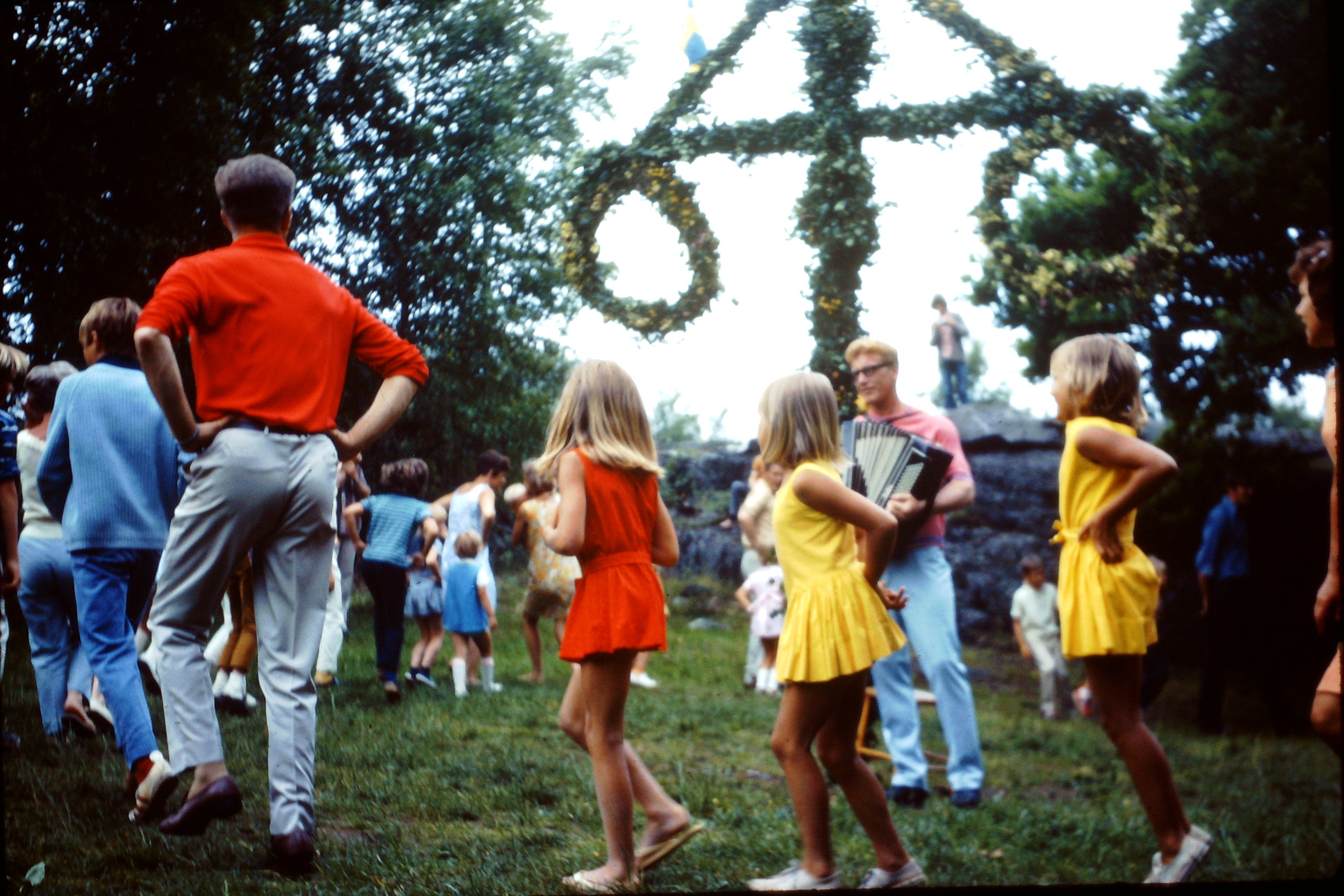
- "Små grodorna" being danced at midsummer, 1969, Årsnäs, Sweden

Song
- Language: Swedish
- English title: The Little Frogs
- Published: 1922
- Genre: Traditional
- Songwriter: Traditional

Små grodorna (Swedish for "The Little Frogs") is a traditional Swedish dance and song traditionally performed at midsummer, where the participants dance around the maypole. The dance involves movements that illustrate body parts that frogs lack, namely "ears" (öron) and "tails" (svansar). Occasionally, Små grodorna is also sung at Christmas, but instead of dancing around the maypole, Swedes dance around the Christmas tree.

The melody originates from the refrain of a military march from the French Revolution, "La Chanson de l'Oignon" ("The Onion Song"), with the text "Au pas, camarade, au pas camarade / au pas, au pas, au pas!" ("In step, comrade"). The enemies of the French at the time, the British, changed the text with condescending irony to "Au pas, grenouilles!" ("In step, little frogs"). The melody is still in use in a French children's song with the original lyrics "Au pas camarades", and is also used on military occasions. It is not known how the melody ended up in Sweden, but the Swedish lyrics are clearly inspired by the English version.

== In popular culture ==
Although the song is not often performed outside Sweden, hundreds of examples of people singing and dancing "Små grodorna" have been uploaded to YouTube, and the performance groups range in size from backyard family parties to multiple thousands gathered in fields and public parks. It has also been sung by Swedish YouTuber PewDiePie during an episode of the game Prop Hunt. The actress Caroline Lagerfelt can be heard singing the song in Steven Spielberg's Minority Report. In the film Peter Stormare plays an eye doctor and Lagerfelt plays his nurse. She subsequently replaces the "ears" (öron) mentioned in the song with "eyes" (ögon). It is thought that Küçük Kurbağa, a popular Turkish nursery rhyme with similar lyrics and almost the same melody, may have its origins in this song

== Lyrics ==
Traditional lyrics in Swedish:

Små grodorna, små grodorna är lustiga att se.
Små grodorna, små grodorna är lustiga att se.
Ej öron, ej öron, ej svansar hava de.
Ej öron, ej öron, ej svansar hava de.

Kou ack ack ack, kou ack ack ack,
kou ack ack ack ack kaa.
Kou ack ack ack, kou ack ack ack,
kou ack ack ack ack kaa.

English translation:

The little frogs, the little frogs are funny to observe.
The little frogs, the little frogs are funny to observe.
No ears, no ears, no tails do they possess.
No ears, no ears, no tails do they possess.

Kou ack ack ack, kou ack ack ack,
kou ack ack ack ack kaa.
Kou ack ack ack, kou ack ack ack,
kou ack ack ack ack kaa.

A more literal English translation:

The small frogs, the small frogs are funny to see.
The small frogs, the small frogs are funny to see.
No ears, no ears, no tails have they.
No ears, no ears, no tails have they.

Croak croak croak, croak croak croak,
Croak croak croak croak a.
Croak croak croak, croak croak croak,
Croak croak croak croak a.

There is also a second verse featuring pigs, sung in a contrast to the first part:

Små grisarna, små grisarna är lustiga att se.
Små grisarna, små grisarna är lustiga att se.
Båd öron, båd öron, och svansar hava de.
Båd öron, båd öron, och svansar hava de.

Å nöff nöff nöff, å nöff nöff nöff,
å nöff nöff nöff nöff nöff.
Å nöff nöff nöff, å nöff nöff nöff,
å nöff nöff nöff nöff nöff.

English translation:

The little pigs, the little pigs are funny to observe.
The little pigs, the little pigs are funny to observe.
Both ears, both ears and tails do they possess.
Both ears, both ears and tails do they possess.

Oh oink oink oink, oh oink oink oink,
oh oink oink oink oink oink
Oh oink oink oink, oh oink oink oink,
oh oink oink oink oink oink

== See also ==
- Midsummer in Sweden
- Jul (Sweden)
