= Chanson de l'Oignon =

French military marching song

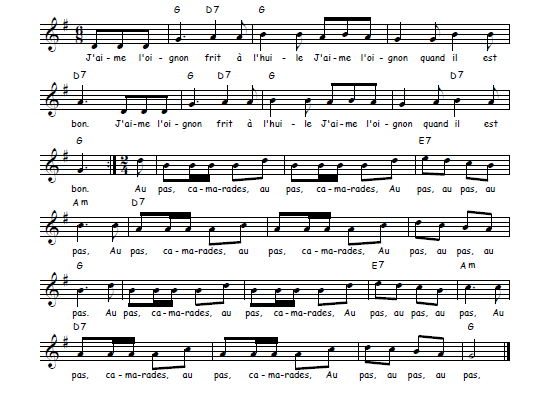
Sheet music

The Chanson de l'Oignon (French pronunciation: [ʃɑ̃sɔ̃ də lɔɲɔ̃]; "Song of the Onion") is a French marching song from around 1800 but the melody can be found earlier in Étienne Méhul’s overture to La chasse de Jeune Henri in 1797.

According to legend, it originated among the Old Guard Grenadiers of Napoleon Bonaparte's Consular Guard. Before the Battle of Marengo, Bonaparte found some grenadiers rubbing an onion on their bread. "Very good," he said, "there is nothing better than an onion for marching on the road to glory."

== Music ==
The verses of the Chanson de l'Oignon are in 6/8, while the refrain is in 2/4. This has the effect of rendering the verses more lyrical and the refrain more military, though both remain the same tempo as befits a marching song.

== Lyrics ==
The lyrics of the original song in French are:

[Verse 1]

J'aime l'oignon frit à l'huile

J'aime l'oignon car il est bon

J'aime l'oignon frit à l'huile

J'aime l'oignon, j'aime l'oignon

[Chorus]

Au pas camarades, au pas camarades

Au pas, au pas, au pas

Au pas camarades, au pas camarades

Au pas, au pas, au pas

[Verse 2]

Un seul oignon frit à l'huile

Un seul oignon nous change en Lion

Un seul oignon frit à l'huile

Un seul oignon un seul oignon

[Chorus]

Au pas camarades, au pas camarades

Au pas, au pas, au pas

Au pas camarades, au pas camarades

Au pas, au pas, au pas

[Verse 3]

Mais pas d'oignons aux Autrichiens

Non pas d'oignons à tous ces chiens

Mais pas d'oignons aux Autrichiens

Non pas d'oignons, non pas d'oignons

[Chorus]

Au pas camarades, au pas camarades

Au pas, au pas, au pas

Au pas camarades, au pas camarades

Au pas, au pas, au pas

[Verse 4]

Aimons l'oignon frit à l'huile

Aimons l'oignon car il est bon

Aimons l'oignon frit à l'huile

Aimons l'oignon, aimons l'oignon

[Chorus]

Au pas camarades, au pas camarades

Au pas, au pas, au pas

Au pas camarades, au pas camarades

Au pas, au pas, au pas

== In popular culture ==
- The refrain was borrowed for the children's song "J'ai perdu le do de ma clarinette" ("I've lost the C on my clarinet"), and for the Swedish song "Små grodorna" ("The Little Frogs"). (The former is best known today in the English-speaking world as "Down on Grandpa's Farm".)
- An arrangement of "Chanson de l'Oignon" by Shirō Hamaguchi is featured in Girls und Panzer das Finale as the song for the French-based school BC Freedom Academy.
