= Monteprandone =

Monteprandone Munneprannù
- Comune
- Comune di Monteprandone
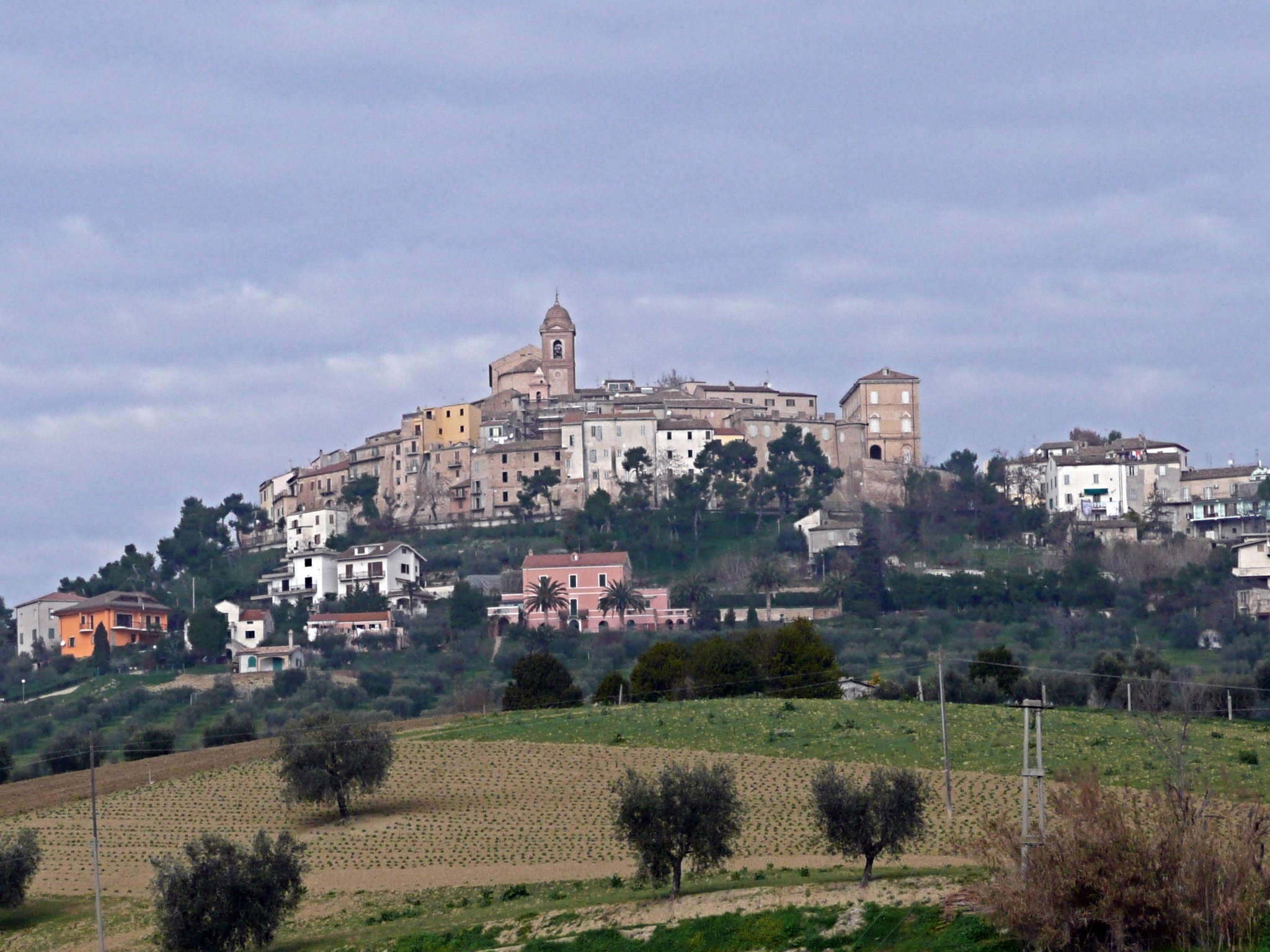

- Location within Italy Location within Marche
- Coordinates: 42°55′N 13°50′E
- Country: Italy
- Region: Marche
- Province: Ascoli Piceno (AP)
- Frazioni: Centobuchi

Government
  - Mayor: Sergio Loggi

Area
  - Total: 26.38 km^{2} (10.19 sq mi)
- Elevation: 280 m (920 ft)

Population (31 October 2017)
  - Total: 12,680
  - Density: 480.7/km^{2} (1,245/sq mi)
- Demonym: Monteprandonesi
- Time zone: UTC+1 (CET)
  - Summer (DST): UTC+2 (CEST)
- Postal code: 63076
- Dialing code: 0735
- Patron saint: St. James of the Marches
- Saint day: November 28
- Website: Official website

Monteprandone (Neapolitan: Munneprannù) is a comune (municipality) in the Province of Ascoli Piceno in the Italian region Marche, located about 80 kilometres (50 mi) southeast of Ancona and about 20 kilometres (12 mi) northeast of Ascoli Piceno. It is the birthplace of James of the Marches.

Monteprandone borders the following municipalities: Acquaviva Picena, Colonnella, Controguerra, Martinsicuro, Monsampolo del Tronto, San Benedetto del Tronto. It is one of I Borghi più belli d'Italia ("The most beautiful villages of Italy").

== See also ==
- Porto d'Ascoli
