= Monsampolo del Tronto =

- Comune
- Comune di Monsampolo del Tronto
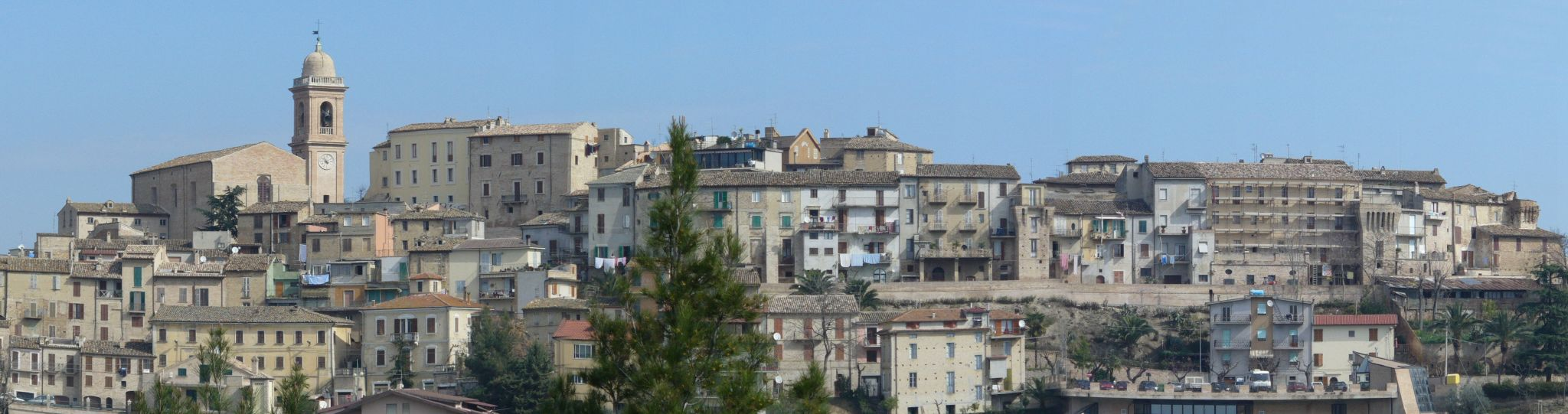
- Skyline

- Location within Italy Location within Marche
- Coordinates: 42°53′N 13°47′E
- Country: Italy
- Region: Marche
- Province: Ascoli Piceno (AP)

Government
  - Mayor: Pierluigi Caioni

Area
  - Total: 15.43 km^{2} (5.96 sq mi)
- Elevation: 184 m (604 ft)

Population (31 October 2017)
  - Total: 4,530
  - Density: 294/km^{2} (760/sq mi)
- Demonym: Monsampolesi
- Time zone: UTC+1 (CET)
  - Summer (DST): UTC+2 (CEST)
- Postal code: 63030
- Dialing code: 0735
- Website: Official website

Monsampolo del Tronto is a comune (municipality) in the Province of Ascoli Piceno in the Italian region Marche, located about 80 kilometres (50 mi) south of Ancona and about 18 kilometres (11 mi) southwest of Ascoli Piceno.

Monsampolo del Tronto borders the following municipalities: Acquaviva Picena, Castorano, Controguerra, Monteprandone, Offida, Spinetoli.
