= Colli del Tronto =

- Comune
- Comune di Colli del Tronto
- Location within Italy Location within Marche
- Coordinates: 42°53′N 13°45′E
- Country: Italy
- Region: Marche
- Province: Province of Ascoli Piceno (AP)

Area
  - Total: 5.9 km^{2} (2.3 sq mi)

Population (Dec. 2004)
  - Total: 3,290
  - Density: 560/km^{2} (1,400/sq mi)
- Demonym: Collesi
- Time zone: UTC+1 (CET)
  - Summer (DST): UTC+2 (CEST)
- Postal code: 63030
- Dialing code: 0736
- Website: Official website

Colli del Tronto ("Tronto's hills") is a comune (municipality) in the Province of Ascoli Piceno in the Italian region Marche, located about 80 kilometres (50 mi) south of Ancona and about 14 kilometres (9 mi) northeast of Ascoli Piceno. As of 31 December 2004, it had a population of 3,290 and an area of 5.9 square kilometres (2.3 mi^{2}).

Colli del Tronto borders the following municipalities: Ancarano, Ascoli Piceno, Castorano, Spinetoli.

== Demographic evolution ==
Historical population

Year	Pop.	±%
1861	992	—
1871	1,211	+22.1%
1881	1,289	+6.4%
1901	1,564	+21.3%
1911	1,676	+7.2%

Year	Pop.	±%
1921	1,809	+7.9%
1931	1,964	+8.6%
1936	1,967	+0.2%
1951	2,003	+1.8%
1961	2,197	+9.7%

Year	Pop.	±%
1971	2,249	+2.4%
1981	2,394	+6.4%
1991	2,721	+13.7%
2001	3,152	+15.8%

Source: Data from ISTAT
