= Spinetoli =

- Comune
- Comune di Spinetoli
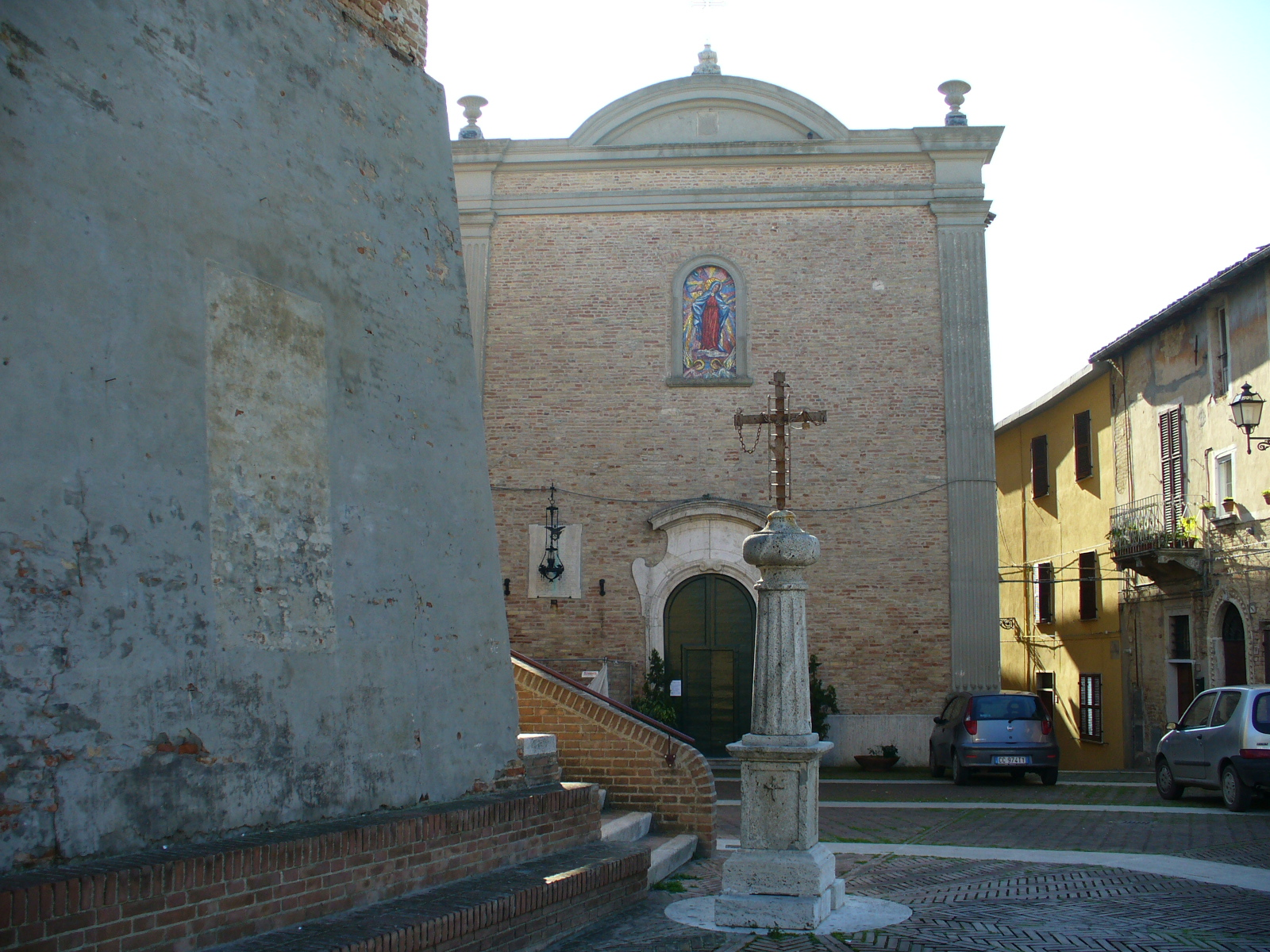
- Madonna delle Grazie Church

- Location within Italy Location within Marche
- Coordinates: 42°53′N 13°46′E
- Country: Italy
- Region: Marche
- Province: Province of Ascoli Piceno (AP)
- Frazioni: Pagliare

Government
  - Mayor: Angelo Canala

Area
  - Total: 12.41 km^{2} (4.79 sq mi)
- Elevation: 176 m (577 ft)

Population (Jan. 2008)
  - Total: 6,848
  - Density: 551.8/km^{2} (1,429/sq mi)
- Demonym: Spinetolesi
- Time zone: UTC+1 (CET)
  - Summer (DST): UTC+2 (CEST)
- Postal code: 63030
- Dialing code: 0736
- Patron saint: Pope Pius X
- Saint day: January 25
- Website: Official website

Spinetoli is a comune (municipality) in the Province of Ascoli Piceno in the Italian region Marche, located about 80 kilometres (50 mi) south of Ancona and about 15 kilometres (9 mi) east of Ascoli Piceno. As of 31 December 2004, it had a population of 6,351 and an area of 12.4 square kilometres (4.8 mi^{2}).

Spinetoli borders the following municipalities: Ancarano, Castorano, Colli del Tronto, Controguerra, Monsampolo del Tronto, Offida.

== Demographic evolution ==
Historical population

Year	Pop.	±%
1861	2,040	—
1871	2,107	+3.3%
1881	2,144	+1.8%
1901	2,725	+27.1%
1911	3,028	+11.1%

Year	Pop.	±%
1921	3,009	−0.6%
1931	3,359	+11.6%
1936	3,555	+5.8%
1951	4,025	+13.2%
1961	4,273	+6.2%

Year	Pop.	±%
1971	4,245	−0.7%
1981	4,693	+10.6%
1991	5,120	+9.1%
2001	5,874	+14.7%

Source: Data from ISTAT
