= Castorano =

- Comune
- Comune di Castorano
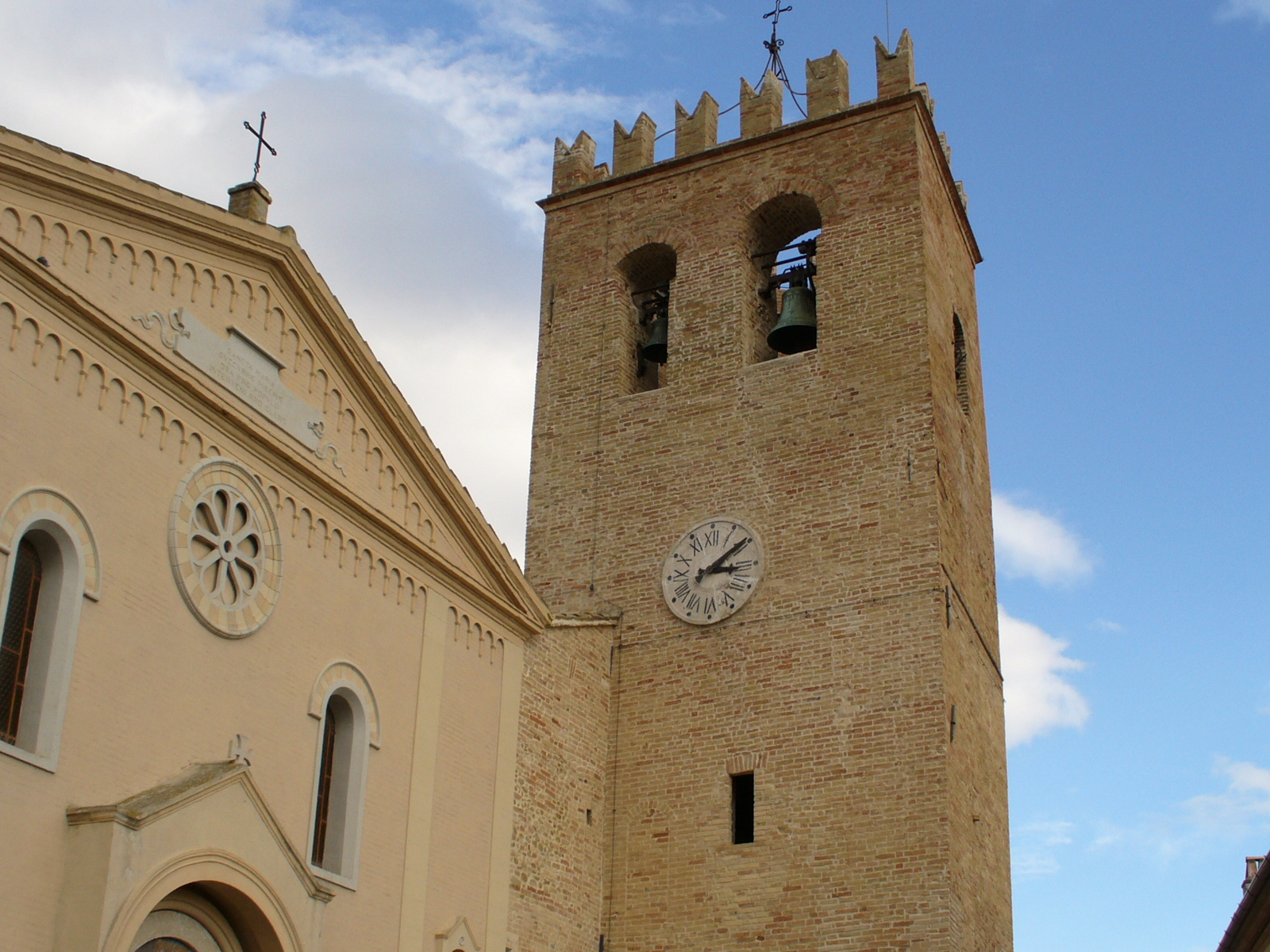
- Church and tower

- Location within Italy Location within Marche
- Coordinates: 42°54′N 13°44′E
- Country: Italy
- Region: Marche
- Province: Ascoli Piceno (AP)

Government
  - Mayor: Daniel Claudio Ficcadenti

Area
  - Total: 14.1 km^{2} (5.4 sq mi)
- Elevation: 279 m (915 ft)

Population (30 June 2017)
  - Total: 2,333
  - Density: 165/km^{2} (429/sq mi)
- Demonym: Castoranesi
- Time zone: UTC+1 (CET)
  - Summer (DST): UTC+2 (CEST)
- Postal code: 63030
- Dialing code: 0736
- Website: Official website

Castorano is a comune (municipality) in the Province of Ascoli Piceno in the Italian region Marche, located about 80 kilometres (50 mi) south of Ancona and about 13 kilometres (8 mi) northeast of Ascoli Piceno.

Castorano borders the following municipalities: Ascoli Piceno, Castel di Lama, Colli del Tronto, Monsampolo del Tronto, Offida, Spinetoli.

== Twin towns ==
- Dobrcz, Poland
- Noisy-sur-École, France
