= Ancarano =

- Comune
- Comune di Ancarano
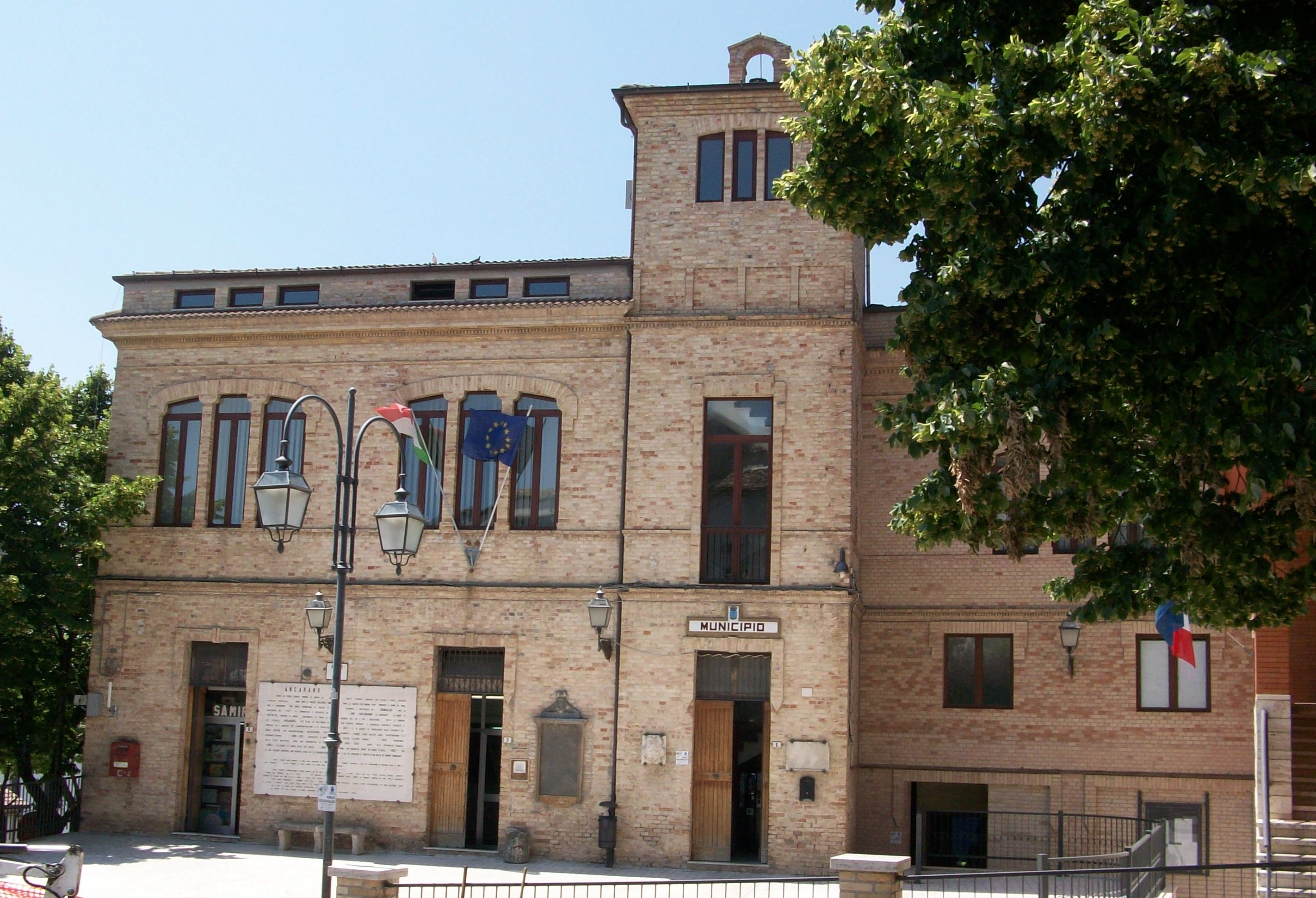

- Location within Italy Location within Abruzzo
- Coordinates: 42°50′N 13°44′E
- Country: Italy
- Region: Abruzzo
- Province: Teramo (TE)
- Frazioni: Casette, Madonna della Carità

Area
  - Total: 14 km^{2} (5.4 sq mi)
- Elevation: 294 m (965 ft)

Population (31 May 2008)
  - Total: 1,897
  - Density: 140/km^{2} (350/sq mi)
- Demonym: Ancaranesi
- Time zone: UTC+1 (CET)
  - Summer (DST): UTC+2 (CEST)
- Postal code: 64010
- Dialing code: 0861
- ISTAT code: 067002
- Patron saint: San Simplicio
- Saint day: 29 July

Ancarano (Marchigiano: 'Ngarà) is a town and comune in Teramo province in the Abruzzo region of eastern Italy. It is located south of the border with Marche.
