= Acquaviva Picena =

- Comune
- Comune di Acquaviva Picena
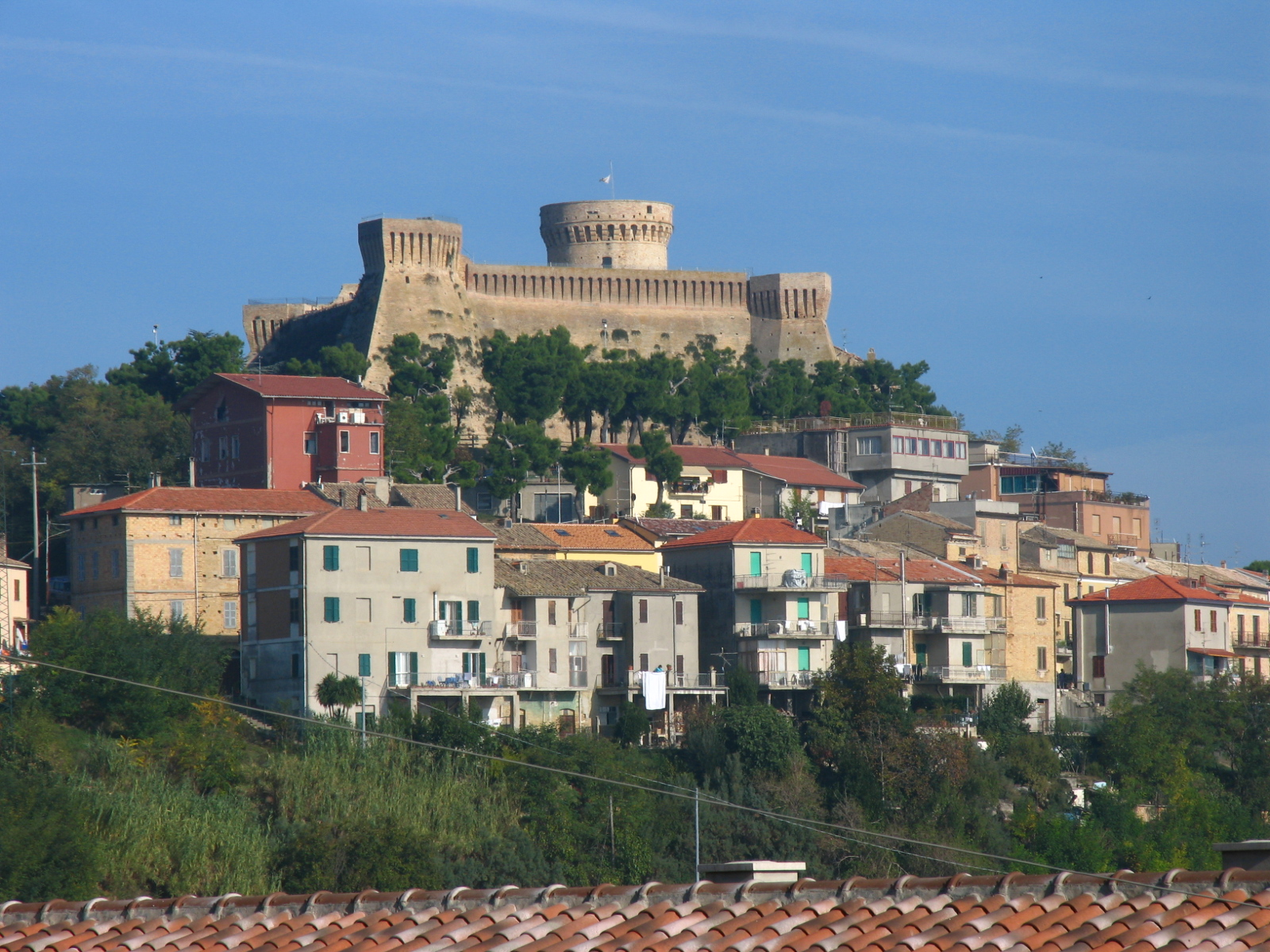
- The fortress of Acquaviva

- Location within Italy Location within Marche
- Coordinates: 42°57′N 13°49′E
- Country: Italy
- Region: Marche
- Province: Ascoli Piceno (AP)
- Frazioni: Abbadetta, Casaricca, Forola, Madonna delle Piane, Quercia, Sant'Angelo

Government
  - Mayor: Pierpaolo Rosetti

Area
  - Total: 20.9 km^{2} (8.1 sq mi)
- Elevation: 365 m (1,198 ft)

Population (2008)
  - Total: 3,690
  - Density: 177/km^{2} (457/sq mi)
- Demonym: Acquavivani
- Time zone: UTC+1 (CET)
  - Summer (DST): UTC+2 (CEST)
- Postal code: 63075
- Dialing code: 0735
- Patron saint: Saint Nicholas
- Saint day: December 6
- Website: Official website

Acquaviva Picena is a comune (municipality) in the Province of Ascoli Piceno in the Italian region Marche. The village lies on a hill overlooking the Valley of Tronto, just a few kilometres from the Adriatic Sea and San Benedetto del Tronto. From the top of the hill (365 m.s.l.), it is possible to see the Sibillini Mountains (Monte Vettore), and even further away Gran Sasso and Majella.

== History ==
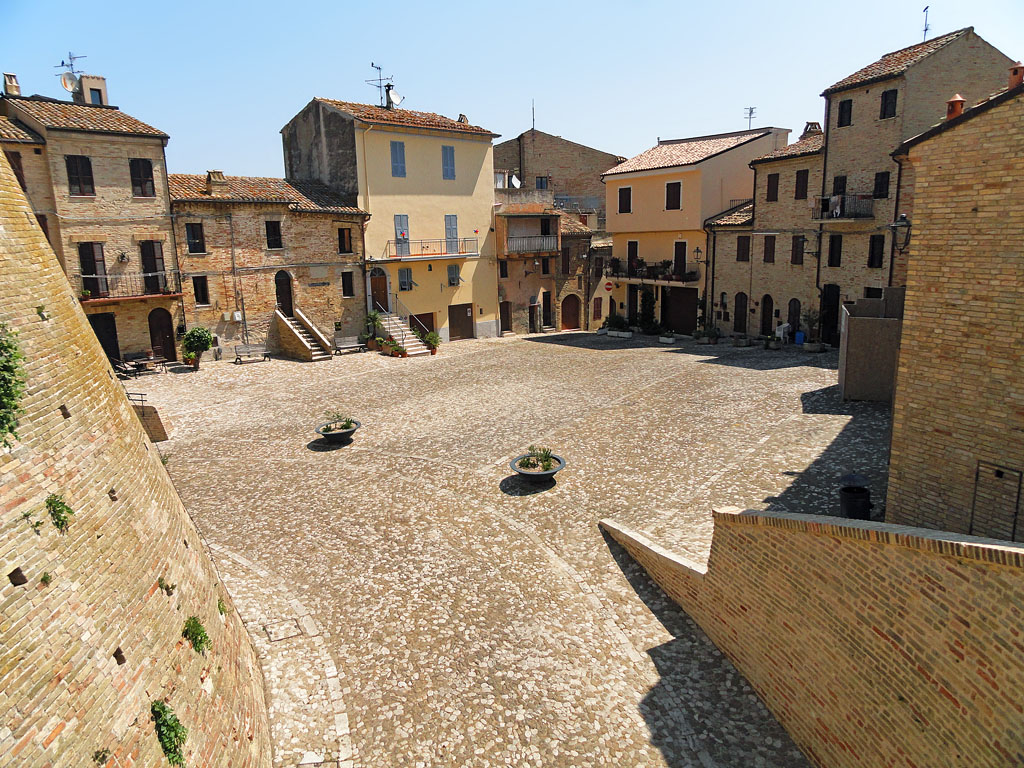
Piazza del Forte

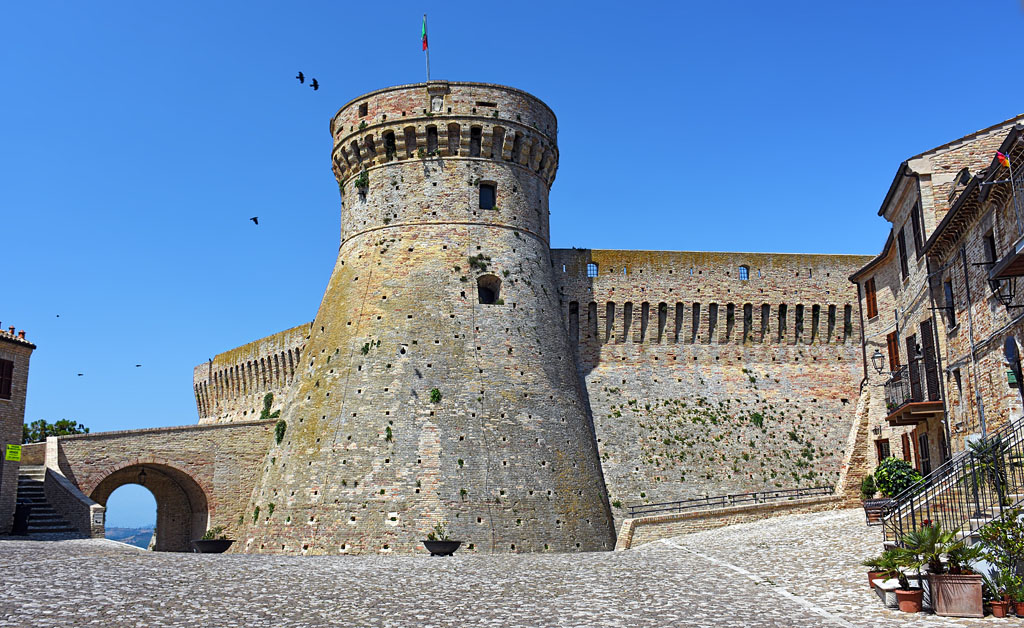
Acquaviva Picena, Fortezza

The Acquaviva area has been inhabited since prehistory. Proof of that are many archaeological finds, most of which are from the Piceno age, but also from the Roman Age. When the Picentes (or Piceni, Italian), who settled here during the 6th century B.C., were subdued by Roman forces, the village of Acquaviva survived due to the closeness to Castrum Truentinum.

During the Barbarian Invasions, the village grew into an urban settlement. The coming of Lombards and Saracens forced the coastal population to move inland. The village was originally owned by the Farfa Abbey (947), then became a feudal holding of the Acquaviva family, who built the fortress during the 13th century.

In 1341, Acquaviva fell under control of the city of Fermo and became a garrison against enemy territory, keeping coastal villages (San Benedetto in Albula) out of the reach of Ascoli. In the 15th century, the village's population grew, bringing its numbers to twice its original size. The eastern section of the village was built and named "Terra nuova" to distinguish it from "Terra vecchia", the original settlement. This made it necessary to build another section of the fortress on the same side, to its east.

As part of the Papal States, Acquaviva was annexed with a plebiscite vote to the Kingdom of Italy in 1860.

== Main sights ==
- Fortress of Acquaviva (13th-14th century). A medieval fortress, among the largest and better preserved in the Marche region, restored in the 15th century by Baccio Pontelli.
- Clock tower
- Church of San Nicolò. Built in the 16th century and restored during the 19th century. The horizontal cornice facade with tympanum hosts the main door, sculpted by craftsmen of the school of Ascoli. The interior has a Latin cross shape with a central nave and holds several works of art, mostly paintings and statues.
- Church of San Rocco (13th century). Built by the Augustinians in 1613, with a cloister.
- Church of San Giuseppe
- Church of Madonna della Pietà
- Church of San Francesco. A Franciscan convent with cloister, the oldest in the Marca Fermana, founded by San Francesco d'Assisi.
- Country church of Santa Maria delle Palme
- Country church of Santa Maria in Accubitu

== Culture ==
Events in the town include:

- Acquaviva Comics Academy, started in 1996 as Acquaviva nei Fumetti and abolished in 2006.
- The historical reenactment Sponsalia, that stages the wedding between Forasteria d'Acquaviva and Rainaldo di Brunforte (1234). Started in 1988 between the months of July and August, two city districts, Aquila and Civetta, compete in the Palio del Duca, a series of trials of medieval sports. A four district (Aquila, Civetta, Falco, Picchio) Palio for elementary and middle school children takes place every year during the month of June.
