= United States–Italy Fulbright Commission =

Bi-national executor of Fulbright grants since 1948

The United States–Italy Fulbright Commission is a bi-national, non-profit organization promoting opportunities for study, research, and teaching in Italy and the United States through competitive, merit-based grants. Since 1948, the commission acts as executor of the Fulbright Program to and from Italy.

== History ==
Created in 1948, the U.S.-Italy Fulbright Commission is one of 50 bi-national organizations responsible for overseeing the international collaboration of the Fulbright Program, one of the most well-known and prestigious scholarship programs in the world.

The commission is governed by a Board of twelve members: six US members, nominated by the United States Ambassador to Italy, and six Italian members, nominated by the Italian Minister of Foreign Affairs.

The Italian Minister of Foreign Affairs and the United States Ambassador to Italy are honorary presidents of the commission.

The United States Department of State, the Bureau of Educational and Cultural Affairs, and the Italian Ministry of Foreign Affairs, General Directorate for Cultural Promotion and Cooperation and General Directorate for the Americas, ensure financial coverage and jointly manage the program.

The commission promotes study, research and lectureship opportunities in Italy and in the United States through Fulbright scholarships for Italian and American citizens (approximately 100 scholarships a year). It organizes and sponsors cultural and educational activities with both a national and international outreach and offers an Information Service on the Fulbright Program and on study and research opportunities in both the United States and Italy.

== Fulbright Program ==
Currently, the Fulbright Program is the largest program of international cultural exchanges in the United States. It was proposed by Senator J. William Fulbright of Arkansas. The program operates in more than 155 countries worldwide, with approximately 294,000 participants awarded over the course of 60 years. Awards vary between study programs, research or teaching in the United States and other participating countries. Each year, approximately 7,500 Fulbright scholarships are awarded.

== Alumni ==
According to the Fulbright website, notable alumni of the U.S.-Italy program include:

=== Italian alumni ===
- Giorgio Abetti †
- Elena Aga Rossi
- Simonetta Agnello Hornby
- Mario Alessi †
- Edoardo Amaldi †
- Giuliano Amato
- Franco Amatori
- Luigi Amerio †
- Roberto Antonelli
- Francesco Antonioni
- Antonio Armellini
- Alberto Asor Rosa †
- Emilio Bajada †
- Sergio Balanzino †
- Laura Balbo
- Piero Bassetti
- Martin Benedikter †
- Paolo Bernardini
- Irene Bignardi
- Lorenzo Bini Smaghi
- Dario Biocca
- Giovanni Boato †
- Remo Bodei †
- Luigi Boitani
- Piero Boitani
- Liana Borghi †
- Gaetano Borriello †
- Michele Bugliesi
- Liana Burgess †
- Francesco Bruni †
- Elisabetta Brusa
- Sandro Calvani
- Maurizio Calvesi †
- Mario Calvo Platero
- Marcello Carapezza †
- Giorgio Careri †
- Franco Carpanelli †
- Antonio Cassese †
- Sabino Cassese
- Lamberto Cesari †
- Massimo Cimino †
- Carlo M. Cipolla †
- Patrizio Civili
- Umberto Colombo †
- Sofia Corradi †
- Enrico Tommaso Cucchiani
- Luigi Dallapiccola †
- Amedeo Dalla Volta †
- Nicola Damiani †
- Mario De Caro
- Fernanda de' Maffei †
- Paola Del Din
- Giovanni De Micheli
- Furio Diaz †
- Lamberto Dini
- Francesco D'Onofrio (politician)
- Umberto Eco †
- Maria Luisa Fagioli †
- Francesco Fedi
- Franco Ferracuti †
- Franco Ferrarotti †
- Alessandro Figà Talamanca †
- Bruno Finzi †
- Christian Filippella
- Luciano Fonda †
- Luigi Fontanella
- Simona Forti
- Carlo Forlivesi
- Francesco Paolo Fulci †
- Luigi Gatteschi †
- Roberto Gervaso †
- Anna Giacalone Ramat
- Riccardo Giacconi †
- Roberto Giammanco †
- Tommaso Giartosio
- Gian Luigi Gigli
- Aldo Giorgini †
- Paolo Giubellino
- Fabrizia Giuliani
- Gino Giugni †
- Carlo Ginzburg †
- Dario Graffi †
- Francesco Grillo
- Patrizia Guarnieri
- Margherita Hack †
- Francesco Iachello
- Piero Ignazi
- Emilio Insolera
- Humberto Insolera
- Stefano Jossa
- Antonio Mario La Pergola †
- Carlo Alessandro Landini
- Paolo Leonardi
- Laura Lilli †
- Alfonso Maria Liquori †
- Massimo Livi Bacci
- Luca Lombardi
- Agostino Lombardo †
- Giuseppe Longo
- Empedocle Maffia †
- Angelo Majorana †
- Lamberto Malatesta †
- Giuseppe Martinoli (botanico) †
- Ugo Mattei
- Viviana Mazza
- Francesco Mei †
- Gian Giacomo Migone
- Daniela Minerva
- Carlo Minnaja
- David Monacchi
- Alberto Monroy †
- Franco Moretti
- Andrea Moro
- Simonetta Moro
- Loretta Napoleoni
- Luigi Gerardo Napolitano †
- Pietro Navarra
- Guglielmo Negri †
- Guido Neppi Modona
- Manfredi Nicoletti †
- Michele Nicoletti
- Alberto Nones
- Annina Nosei
- Mario Oriani-Ambrosini †
- Luigi Pasinetti †
- Gianfranco Pasquino
- Corrado Passera
- Katia Passerini
- Marcello Pera
- Sergio Perosa
- Pierluigi Petrobelli †
- Giandomenico Picco †
- Mario Prosperi †
- Michele Provinciali †
- Giuseppe Quatriglio †
- Carlo Ratti
- Tullio Regge †
- Lucrezia Reichlin
- Manlio Resta †
- Gianni Riotta
- Cecilia Robustelli
- Stefano Rodotà †
- Virginio Rognoni †
- Cesare P.R. Romano
- Lucia Ronchetti
- Silvia Ronchey
- Anna Rossi-Doria †
- Bernardo Rossi-Doria
- Manlio Rossi-Doria †
- Mimmo Rotella †
- Carlo Rubbia
- Giuseppe Sacco
- Antonino Saggio
- Luigi Salerno †
- Giorgio Salvini †
- Alberto Sangiovanni-Vincentelli
- Giovanni Sartori †
- Giuseppe Scortecci †
- Salvatore Settis
- Mario Sica
- Flavia Sparacino
- Giorgio Spini †
- Luigi Squarzina †
- Maria Luisa Stringa †
- Marco Stroppa
- Paolo Sylos Labini †
- Biancamaria Tedeschini Lalli †
- Tullio Tentori †
- Massimo Teodori
- Enzo Tiezzi †
- Irene Tinagli
- Fabrizio Tonello
- Edoardo Tortarolo
- Piero Treves †
- Vanni Treves †
- Pasquale Tridico
- Alessandro Triulzi
- Domenicangela Lina Unali
- Paolo Valore
- Gian Berto Vanni †
- Christian Vassallo
- Umberto Vattani
- Lionello Venturi †
- Massimiliano Versace
- Itala Vivan
- Vito Zagarrio
- Vladimiro Zagrebelsky
- Michele Zappella †
- Federico Zeri †

=== U.S. alumni ===
- Alfred C. Aman, Jr.
- Bumpei Akaji †
- Douglas Allanbrook †
- Putnam Aldrich †
- Herbert L. Anderson †
- Dominick Argento †
- Leonard J. Arrington †
- Kenneth Arrow †
- Darius Arya
- Jerome A. Barron
- Khadra Bashir Ali †
- Pranab Bardhan
- Denver Michelle Beattie
- Robert Beauchamp †
- J. Bowyer Bell †
- Ruth Ben-Ghiat
- Arthur Asa Berger
- Lisa Biagiotti
- Steve Bickerstaff †
- Norman Birnbaum †
- Lee Bontecou †
- Daniel J. Boorstin †
- Samuel Bowles (economist)
- Theodore V. Buttrey Jr. †
- David Brion Davis †
- Eric Britton †
- James M. Buchanan †
- Noel DaCosta †
- Edmond Casarella †
- Nicolas Carone †
- Diana Cavallo †
- Francesco Cesareo
- Debra Cheverino
- Dale Chihuly
- Jerry Cooper
- William J. Connell (historian)
- Aaron Copland †
- Domenic Cretara †
- Frederick Crews †
- Dan Dailey (glass artist)
- James Dashow
- Stephen De Staebler †
- Peter Diamond
- David DiChiera †
- Niels Diffrient †
- Spencer M. Di Scala
- Lois Dodd
- Grant Drumheller
- Norman Dyhrenfurth †
- John Eaton (composer) †
- Shirlee Emmons †
- Nader Engheta
- Megan Euker
- Richard Faith †
- Daniel Ferro †
- Leslie Fiedler †
- Robert O. Fink †
- Marshall Fishwick †
- Nicolas Flagello †
- John Freccero †
- Maryellen Fullerton
- Bianca Garcia
- Angelo Garzio †
- Milton Gendel †
- Joseph Giardina †
- Gregory Gillespie †
- Milton Glaser †
- Myron Goldsmith †
- James Green (educator) †
- Eugene P. Gross †
- Elaine Hamilton-O'Neal †
- Susan Harbage Page
- James Higginbotham †
- Theodore Holmes Bullock †
- Raymond F. Hopkins
- L. Thomas Hopkins †
- Peter Hujar †
- Edgar Hull †
- Ada Louise Huxtable †
- Wolf Kahn †
- Richard Karpen
- James E. Katz
- John Kearney (artist) †
- Murray Kempton †
- David Kertzer
- William King (artist) †
- George Kish †
- Karl Klare
- Barbara Knowles Debs
- Karl Korte †
- Herbert Kubly †
- Allen Kurzweil
- Frank Judge †
- Gabriel Laderman †
- Joseph La Palombara †
- Linda Lappin
- Irving Lavin †
- Lynne Lawner
- Stanford Lehmberg †
- Alan Lelchuk
- Richard S. Levy †
- Lewis Lockwood
- Pamela O. Long
- Alvin Lucier †
- Lorin Maazel †
- Sabina Magliocco
- Jules Maidoff
- Judith Malafronte
- Radenka Maric
- Richard Marquis
- Donald Martino †
- Berthe Marti †
- Emily Mason †
- Garrett Mattingly †
- Bob McMath
- Howard McParlin Davis †
- Maaza Mengiste
- Richard Miller (singer) †
- Henry A. Millon †
- Andrea Modica
- Franco Modigliani †
- Anna Moffo †
- William Morgan (architect) †
- Ann Morning
- Mark Musa †
- Anna Nagurney
- Robert Neffson
- Louis J. Nigro, Jr. †
- Louis Owens †
- Revilo P. Oliver †
- Robert Pack (poet and critic) †
- Anne Paolucci †
- Alan John Pascuzzi
- Philip Pearlstein †
- Michael J. Piore
- David Pingree †
- Sylvia Poggioli
- Daniel Pollack
- Andreas Poulimenos
- Larry Pressler
- Robert Putnam
- Joseph Raffael †
- Francis J. Ricciardone, Jr.
- Theodore Roethke †
- Kait Rhoads
- David Rosand †
- Richard Rosecrance
- Robert A. Rosenstone †
- Robert Royal (author)
- Frederic Rzewski †
- Frederick P. Salvucci
- Ellis Sandoz †
- Alberto Sbacchi †
- Emilio Segrè †
- Richard Serra †
- Salvatore Scibona
- Thomas Robert Shannon Broughton †
- Sarai Sherman †
- Taije Silverman
- Larry R. Smith
- Frank M. Snowden_Jr. †
- Richard E. Spear
- Dominic J. Squatrito †
- Teresa Stich-Randall †
- Thaddeus Strassberger
- Jack Stauffacher †
- Michael Steinberg (music critic) †
- Jeffrey C. Stewart
- Mark Strand †
- Gregory Sumner
- Nina Tandon
- Webster Tarpley
- Richard Teitelbaum †
- Paul Thek †
- John Thow †
- Rudolph Edward Torrini †
- Gene Tsudik
- Garner Tullis †
- Peter Vaghi
- Hal Varian
- Peter Viereck †
- Octavia Waldo †
- William Weaver †
- Arnold Weinstein †
- William Westney
- Oliver Williamson †
- Betty Woodman †
- L. Randall Wray
- Charles Wright (poet)
- Peyton Young
- Arlene Zallman †
- Astra Zarina †
