= Gian Berto Vanni =

Italian painter (1927–2017)

Gian Berto Vanni (Rome, June 30, 1927 − Kythira, September 8, 2017) was an Italian painter. He studied with Alberto Bragaglia, Friedrich Vordemberge-Gildewart, and Josef Albers. He lived and worked in Rome, Paris, New York City, and Kythira.

== Biography ==
Vanni had his first solo exhibition in 1948, at the Galleria Margherita in Rome. In 1949 he won a scholarship awarded by the Dutch government to study in Amsterdam under the neo-plastic painter Friedrich Vordemberge-Gildewart. In 1952 Vanni won a Fulbright Scholarship to study at Yale University, under the guidance of Josef Albers.

From 1953 to 1960 Vanni lived in Paris, painting and illustrating children's books. In 1954 he worked as a color consultant for a documentary on Pablo Picasso by Luciano Emmer.

In 1955 he began a twenty-five-year collaboration with the Schneider Gallery in Rome, alongside such artists as Corrado Cagli, with whom he has been frequently associated.

From 1960 to 1979 Vanni lived in Rome, exhibiting also at the Rizzoli Gallery and the Galleria Nuovo Carpine. In 1979 he left Rome to settle in New York City, where he taught at the Cooper Union School of Art from 1984 to 2014.

== The work ==
In Vanni's early works, vivid colors interact with crystalline formations, which several art critics have associated with the work of Paul Klee.

In the early 1960s, after his return to Rome, Vanni was briefly influenced by the Informale movement.

In the mid-1960s Vanni juxtaposed those two approaches. Dino Buzzati wrote in 1968 that “just as on the same wall paintings by different artists can, perhaps through violent contrasts and contradictions, merge in a fortunate harmony, so Vanni gathers in the same canvas two, three, four sections which, considered in isolation, may seem to be by different authors.”

Thereafter, transposing this approach from space to time, Vanni projected his abstract films on translucent bas-reliefs, then returned to painting on canvas with works that stressed the contrast between texture, color, and drawing until his departure for New York in 1979. In the works produced in New York all the elements of his previous periods coexist.

Art critic Giorgio di Genova writes about Vanni's American paintings: “Everything is something else, every substance is appearance, and appearance is painting, a sumptuously bejeweled art of formal and technical inventions.”

Vanni also illustrated several books, including Agostino by Alberto Moravia, Love by Lowell A. Siff, and The Magic Chalk by Zinken Hopp, for which he won in 1958 the “Oscar de l'Album”, awarded by the Club des Lecteurs, Paris. He has been recognized as a pioneer of Italian animation for a short film that he created in 1943. Between 2021 and 2022, a major anthological exhibition dedicated to his work was held in New York with a selection of over 50 works.

== Bibliography ==
- Cynthia Maris Dantzic, 100 New York Painters, Atglen, PA, Schiffer Publishing, ISBN 978-0764325434.
- Valentina Puccioni, Gian Berto Vanni − Itinerari Pittorici − Catalogue Raisonné – Catalogo Completo, Masters Thesis, Supervisor Prof. Enrico Crispolti, University of Siena, Siena, Italy
- Gian Berto Vanni, Love, Edinburgh, Canongate Books, ISBN 978-0862418199.
- Stephanie Buhmann, The Inner Life of Dreamscapes, The Villager, volume 78, number 40, New York, NY. March 11−17 2009
- Giorgio Di Genova, History of Italian Art of the Twentieth Century, Bologna, Bora, 1981, IT \ ICCU \ CFI \ 0039104 pp. 133, 135, 190−191
