= Stelman =

Italian painter

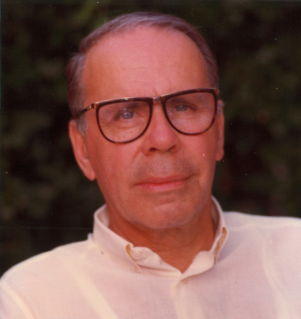
A photo of Stelman

Stelman, pseudonym of Stelio Manneschi (Talla, Arezzo, November 10, 1927 – Arezzo, October 20, 1998), was an Italian painter.

Stelman has been described as the most representative artist of the fragmentation of artistic language characteristic of the 20th century.

== Early life and education ==
Stelman was born in Talla on November 10, 1927. His mother, Lina, a painter and miniaturist, died when he was just over a year old.

From a young age, driven by a longing for his mother, he loved to paint. He began to experiment with oil painting at the age of 19, portraying glimpses of Arezzo, forgotten corners, and evocative and symbolist night scenes.

He graduated from the "Redi" Scientific High School in Arezzo, and he earned a degree in Political Science from the University of Florence.

== Career ==
In the 1960s, he engaged with Informal art, and later, having absorbed the poetics of fragmentation, he began to blend oil and collage.

In the early 1970s, he embarked on a journey that lead him to inaugurate a personal and original style: he retrieved cuttings from newspapers and magazines, excerpts from the media of the era, rearranged them into a sketch according to a "vision", and based on the sketch, he created the painting. Always oil on canvas, these works exhibit expansive chromatic effects and intricate spatial solutions.

Following an exchange of correspondence with Giulio Carlo Argan, he refined his style by traversing various creative phases.

After some initial exhibitions in Tuscany (Borgo San Lorenzo, Municipal Hall, 1973; Florence, "L'incontro" Gallery, 1973; Arezzo, Civic Hall, 1974), on January 8, 1976, Stelman exhibited in Rome at the "Astrolabio Arte" gallery, with an introduction by Sandra Giannattasio.

In 1983, he exhibited in Florence at the "Inquadrature" Gallery with an introduction by Giuliano Serafini, and in 1984, he once again exhibited in Arezzo at the Circolo Artistico with an introduction by Mariano Apa. In 1986, the municipality of Arezzo invited him to exhibit at the Municipal Halls of the Loggia del Vasari. In the same year, he was invited to the Sette di Quadri Gallery in Arezzo and to the "Internationale Kunstbiennale" in Seetal, Zurich.

In 1988, upon the invitation of master Franco Farina, he exhibited at the Palazzo dei Diamanti in Ferrara, with an introduction by Giorgio di Genova. In 1989, he was invited to the International Art Fair in Stuttgart. In 1990, invited by the municipality of Perugia, he held a solo exhibition at the Palazzo dei Priori. In both 1990 and 1991, he participated in the Arte Fiera in Bologna.

In total, he exhibited 27 times, including 16 solo exhibitions and 11 group exhibitions, between 1973 and 1994. However, in 1994 he started experiencing issues with his vision, which he ultimately lost completely in 1995.

== Death and legacy ==
He died in Arezzo on October 20, 1998.

In September 2018, at the initiative of his family, a commemorative exhibition of his paintings was held at the exhibition halls of the MAEC in Cortona. The event was endorsed by the Tuscany Region, the Municipality of Cortona, and the Accademia Etrusca. The exhibition was inaugurated by a lecture by the critic Giorgio di Genova. This marked a revival of critical interest, leading to several of Stelman's paintings being featured in various group exhibitions (BiCC 2018; "La diversità del femminile, MitreoIside" at Il Corviale in 2019; XLVI Premio Sulmona 2019).

== Sources ==
- Giorgio Di Genova, Stelman, Gangemi Editore, 2020, ISBN 9788849237917
- Giorgio Di Genova, Enzo Le Pera and Maurizio Vitiello, Panorama dell'Arte Contemporanea in Italia 2019, Rubbettino, 2019, ISBN 8849860463
- Giorgio Di Genova, Carlo Franza and Enzo Le Pera, Percorsi d'Arte in Italia, Rubbettino, 2018, ISBN 978-88-498-5632-3
- XLVI Premio Sulmona "Gaetano Pallozzi" Rassegna Internazionale d'Arte Contemporanea, Verdone Editore, 2019, ISBN 9788896868782
- Mario Rotta, Stelman, Universo della memoria, in TerzoOcchio, n. 55, 1990
