= Enzo Carnebianca =

Italian painter

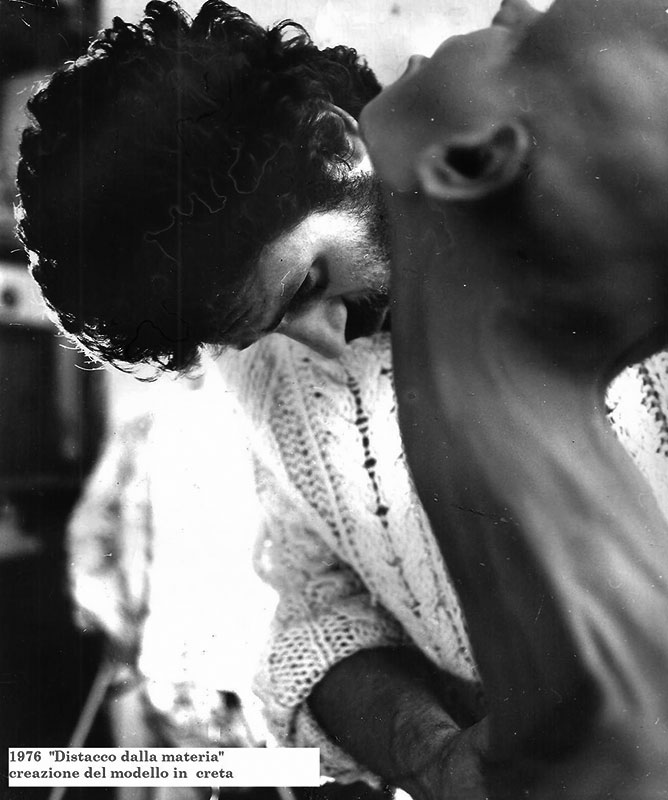
1976 - M° Enzo Carnebianca creating the clay model of “Detachment from matter”

Enzo Carnebianca, is a sculptor and painter born in Rome, Italy (March 18, 1948).

== Biography ==
His father was Alfonso dei Carnebianca di Sezze, his mother Clelia Pelliccione. He is considered by art critics to be the most coherent and brilliant follower of fantastic surrealism, which had in its highest expression in Alberto Savino in Italy and in Salvator Dalì at European level. From 1969 he took part to more than 100 international - solo and collective – exhibitions.

He won prestigious prizes and awards, his artworks are present in many prestigious public and private collections both in Europe and in the rest of the world. Four of his first works, as young artist, are located in the Central Hall of the Historic Artistic Museum, “The Treasure of Saint Peter in Vatican” inside Saint Peter's Basilica in Vatican City – Rome.

Since 1966, he has worked as a painter and in the field of Italian Theatre Design, with Camillo Parravicini and from 1968 in Dino De Laurentiis's Cinema Studios. He has also worked in Cinecittà, on the film sets of director Fred Tuch, accompanying his uncle Vincenzo Pelliccione, stage name Eugene DeVerdi. In the 1980s he worked in Caracas for Italcambio at the same time as Salvador Dali and Pietro Annigoni.

== Prizes and awards ==
During the years he received prizes and awards, among others:

- 1995 the International award "La Plejade" Silver Plate for Sculpture, in the Chamber of Deputies of the Italian Parliament;
- 1998 the prize "La cultura del mare" in San Felice Circeo (Latina - Lazio) and the golden medal for sculpture;
- 2002 was awarded the title of "Honorary Academic of the Pontificia Accademia Tiberina";
- 2007 was awarded the special prize Silver Plate of the Presidency of the Italian Republic for his artistic career;
- 2010 was awarded the title of "Honorary Academic of G.G.Belli Academy of Rome” and is entitled freeman of Rome by the deputy mayor of Rome.
- 2011 was awarded the International award Kouros for Sculpture,
- many participations and prizes at the “Sulmona Award”, last but not least in 2014 awarded by Vittorio Sgarbi.

He is registered in S.I.A.E. since 1986 within which he has been representative of Sculptors to S.I.A.E. figurative Arts Committee of the O.L.A.F. Section (Literary Works and Figurative Arts). In 1975 he has been member founder of the U.L.A. In 2005 he has been the promoter of the "Committee for the constitution of the category of Teachers and Artists of Visual Arts" and for the reduction of V.A.T. share to 4%, by the legislative office of the Ministry of Culture. He is the proposer of the “S.I.A.E. stamp for Figurative Arts" that is a particular S.I.A.E. labeling issued by the O.L.A.F. Section only to living artists. It confers an added value to the work of art avoiding market mystifications and guaranteeing the authenticity of the circulations of the works of art. Carnebianca begun to use this special stamp in 2003 as certification of guarantee of one of his work-prize, and he is the first one in the world who conceived, proposed, and applied it.

== Critics ==
Many art critics and art historians have written about him. Among others: Dario Bellezza, Carlo Fabrizio Carli, Marco Gallo, Giorgio Di Genova, Domenico Guzzi, Salvatore Italia, Elio Mercuri, Guido Mazzotta, Dario Rezza, Vito Riviello, Giuseppe Selvaggi, Carlo Savini, Claudio Strinati, Luigi Tallarico, Cesare Vivaldi.

== Poets ==
Many poets have written for him. Among others: "Per Enzo Carnebianca" (1993) by Dario Bellezza, "Il Tempo" (1994) by Elisabetta Granzotto, "Scultura del Tempo" (1994) by Antonio Lo Iacono, "Cera Persa Cleopatra"(1994) by Mario Lunetta, "Bronzo Cosmico"(1994) by Vito Riviello.

== Musicians ==
M° Nicola Colabianchi former artistic director of Teatro dell’Opera di Roma composed and played for him the symphonic opera "Time without Time" (1994).

== Solo exhibitions among others ==
In 1980 in Caracas at the Venezuelan Institute of Italian Culture,

in 1983 in Rome at the Cinema Capranica for Fantafestival - Cinema Review of Science Fiction

in 1987 in Rome at the Galleria Tartaruga curator Domenico Guzzi

In 1988 in L'Aquila at the National Museum of Abruzzo curator Cesare Vivaldi and Valletta (Malta) retrospective exhibition at the National Museum of Archeology, curator Cesare Vivaldi

In 1994 in Rome Galleria Ca' d'Oro text and presentation of Dario Bellezza curator Tony Porcella,

Celano (AQ) Museum Castello Piccolomini, exhibition titled "BEYOND THAT 'YOU SEE" curator Giorgio Di Genova

Rome cultural operation at the Oak of Tasso, intervention by Ferruccio Ulivi and Carlo Savini,

in L'Aquila in the Abruzzo National Museum exhibition entitled "TIME WITHOUT TIME",

in 1995 in Pescara displays at the birthplace of Gabriele D'Annunzio, entitled" LOST WAX CLEOPATRA "catalog presentation by Mario Lunetta,

In 1997 in Rome View at the CASC room the Bank of Italy, presented by Claudio Strinati and Maurizio Berri,

Milano City "VITRUM 2005"

"The Key of Life" 2012,

"Thime Wihouth Time" Art Basel Miami (USA) curator Gloria Porcella,

"2013 Year of the Italian Culture" Coral Gables (USA) curator Gloria Porcella,

== Collective exhibitions among others ==
In 1983 in New York Expo New York'83, in 1985 in Bari Expo Bari'85, in 1990 and 1991 in Rome at the Monumental Complex of San Michele, in 1991 in Tokyo at the Open Air Museum, 1991-2007 Sulmona (AQ) Sulmona Prize, in 1992 in Rome at the Rondanini Gallery, "art trails in Lazio", in 1995 in Deruta (PG) Moretti Gallery "Comoditas", in 1996 in L'Aquila Abruzzo National Museum, in 1997 in Rome Palazzo delle Esposizioni in Rome curator Giorgio Di Genova, Rome Palazzo delle Esposizioni participates with the work "Dance in Time - the Key of Life" the exhibition "the great female characters of Italian literature in the interpretation of contemporary art" curated by Ferruccio Ulivi in Rome: "Arteroma'97 Expo" at the Fiera di Roma, in 2000 in Berlin shows "No Soap No Hope "at Galerie Weisser Elefant curator Gloria Porcella in 2001 to Monterosso Calabro (VV) National Exhibition of Contemporary Art Biennal, presented by Luigi Tallarico, in 2003 in Milan on the occasion of the 8th International Exhibition of Modern and Contemporary Art, in Rome Gallery "Soligo," in Rome International Exhibition of Contemporary Sculpture, in Ostia at the Port of Rome "La Bellezza came from the Sea" scientific direction of Francesco Sisinni, in 2007 in Rome at the Chamber of Deputies, "in White Works" presentation A. Natale Rossi, in 2008 the Sanctuary of San Gabriele Isola del Gran Sasso (TE) Thirteenth Biennial of Contemporary Sacred Art, Stauròs Foundation curated by Mons.Carlo Chenis, in 2011 Rome - Ostia at the Sports Museum of the Olympic Center FIJLKAM, participates in the 1st Biennale di scultura International Festival of Rome, Casina Valadier curators Gloria Porcella and Lamberto Petrecca, 2012 Rome-Ostia Sport and Myth in the Museum of Olympic Sports Center FIJLKAM, 2013 Artist Exhibiting Artist ArtCenter South Florida Miami (USA), "Timeless Time" with "Beyond time" works by Salvador Dalí Ca 'd'Oro Gallery in Coral Gables (USA) presented by Gloria Porcella. 2013 Roma in The First Luxury Hotel “Art Carpet” curator Gianluca Marziani e Giulia Abate for Galleria Mucciaccia, 2014 Castles (AQ) "For Love of Ceramics" curator Giuseppe Bacci. 2014 41st Prize Sulmona curator Carlo Fabrizio Carli.

== Bibliography ==
- L'Arte Italiana nel XX° Secolo, Giuseppe Neri, Roma, Edizioni Due Torri, 1977
- Enzo Carnebianca: mostra personale : Museo nazionale d'Abruzzo, Castello cinquecentesco Sala Elephas - 8/31 luglio 1988 [presentazione di Cesare Vivaldi] Roma Arti grafiche Pedanesi, 1988
- Enzo Carnebianca: Mostra Antologica National Museum of Archeology : La Valletta-Malta : dal 29 aprile al 15 maggio 1989 Roma : Arti grafiche Pedanesi 1988
- Quelli che contano, Ferdinando Anselmetti, Marsilio Editori, 1991
- Enzo Carnebianca: opere presentate da Michele Calabrese : testo di Vito Riviello; foto di Aldo Matiddi Roma - Parigi: Edizioni d'arte Poliedro Nuovo, 1992
- Enzo Carnebianca: I sentieri dell'arte: Lazio: 15 luglio - 15 settembre, Roma Palazzo Rondanini alla Rotonda - Edizioni Roma, 1992
- Catalogo Internazionale d'Arte Moderna n°6, Editrice d'Arte CIDA, Roma, 1993
- Enzo Carnebianca: oltre ciò che si vede, Giorgio Di Genova, Edizioni Sottotraccia, Roma, 1994
- Enzo Carnebianca: mostra personale: bronzi - ori, tecniche miste: dal 27 aprile al 15 maggio 1994 / testo di Dario Bellezza Roma: Galleria Ca' D'Oro, c1994
- Enzo Carnebianca: Cera persa Cleopatra / Mario Lunetta; catalogo a cura di Egidio Maria Eleuteri Ed. Impressioni d'arte, 1994
- Enzo Carnebianca: Oltre cio che si vede: Museo Nazionale della Marsica Castello Piccolomini di Celano, L'Aquila: retrospettiva 1970-1994 / [mostra a cura di Giorgio Di Genova] Edizioni Sottotraccia, 1994
- Enzo Carnebianca: il tempo senza tempo: Forte spagnolo, Museo nazionale L'Aquila, 7 dicembre 1994-15 gennaio 1995 : mostra e catalogo a cura di Domenico Guzzi Ed Messere Giordana Roma, 1994
- Enzo Carnebianca: Oltre cio che si vede: Museo Nazionale della Marsica Castello Piccolomini di Celano, L'Aquila : retrospettiva 1970-1994 mostra a cura di Giorgio Di Genova] Edizioni Sottotraccia Roma, 1994
- Arte Moderna, l'Arte Contemporanea dal 2° dopoguerra ad oggi, Ed. Giorgio Mondadori, Milano, 1996
- Quintetto d'arte: Vittorio Amadio, Enzo Carnebianca, Antonio Cremonese, Marisa Marconi, Clodoveo Masciarelli : Roma, 12 dicembre 1996-6 gennaio 1997 a cura di Giorgio Di Genova Ascoli Piceno La Sfinge Malaspina, 1996
- Enzo Carnebianca: La chiave della vita : C.A.S.C. della Banca d'Italia, 21-25 ottobre 1997 catalogo a cura di Claudio Strinati e Maurizio Berri Tipografia Messere Ed Roma, 1997
- Annuario d'Arte Moderna Italiana, artisti contemporanei 1997, Ed.ACCA, Roma, 1997
- Albo dei pittori e degli scultori 2001, ENAP, Editori Laterza, Bari, 2001
- Doppio fantasma, Mario Lunetta, Fermenti Ed., Roma, 2003
- Artisti del Novecento a Roma, Renato Civiello, Rendina Editori, Roma, 2003
- La Bellezza venuta dal mare, Francesco Sisinni, Roma, De Luca Editori d'Arte, 2003
- XIII Biennale Staurós d’Arte Sacra Contemporanea, Carlo Chenis, Teramo, Fondazione Staurós Italiana, 2008
- Guida al Museo Storico-artistico del Tesoro di San Pietro in Vaticano Ed ATS Italia Editrice-Edizioni Capitolo Vaticano Roma 2009
- Biennale di scultura Rassegna Internazionale di Scultura di Roma 2011, Gloria Porcella e Lamberto Petrecca, Maretti Editore 2011
- Art Carpet Catalogo della Mostra collettiva 2013, Gianluca Marziani e Giulia Abate Galleria Mucciaccia Editore,
- 41^ Premio Sulmona 2014 Catalogo della mostra collettiva Ed. Il Quadrivio Sulmona 2014
