= Valore =

Valore may refer to:

== Places ==
- Vlorë, city in Albania

== People ==
- Danielle Valore Evans, American fiction writer
- Paolo Valore (born 1972), Italian philosopher and academic
- Stefano Valore di Villanueva de Castellòn (born 1970), Italian entrepreneur
- Valore Casini (1590–1660), Italian painter

== Other uses ==
- Valore (company), online textbook marketplace

== See also ==
- Valori, Italian surname
