= Renzo Eusebi =

Italian painter and sculptor

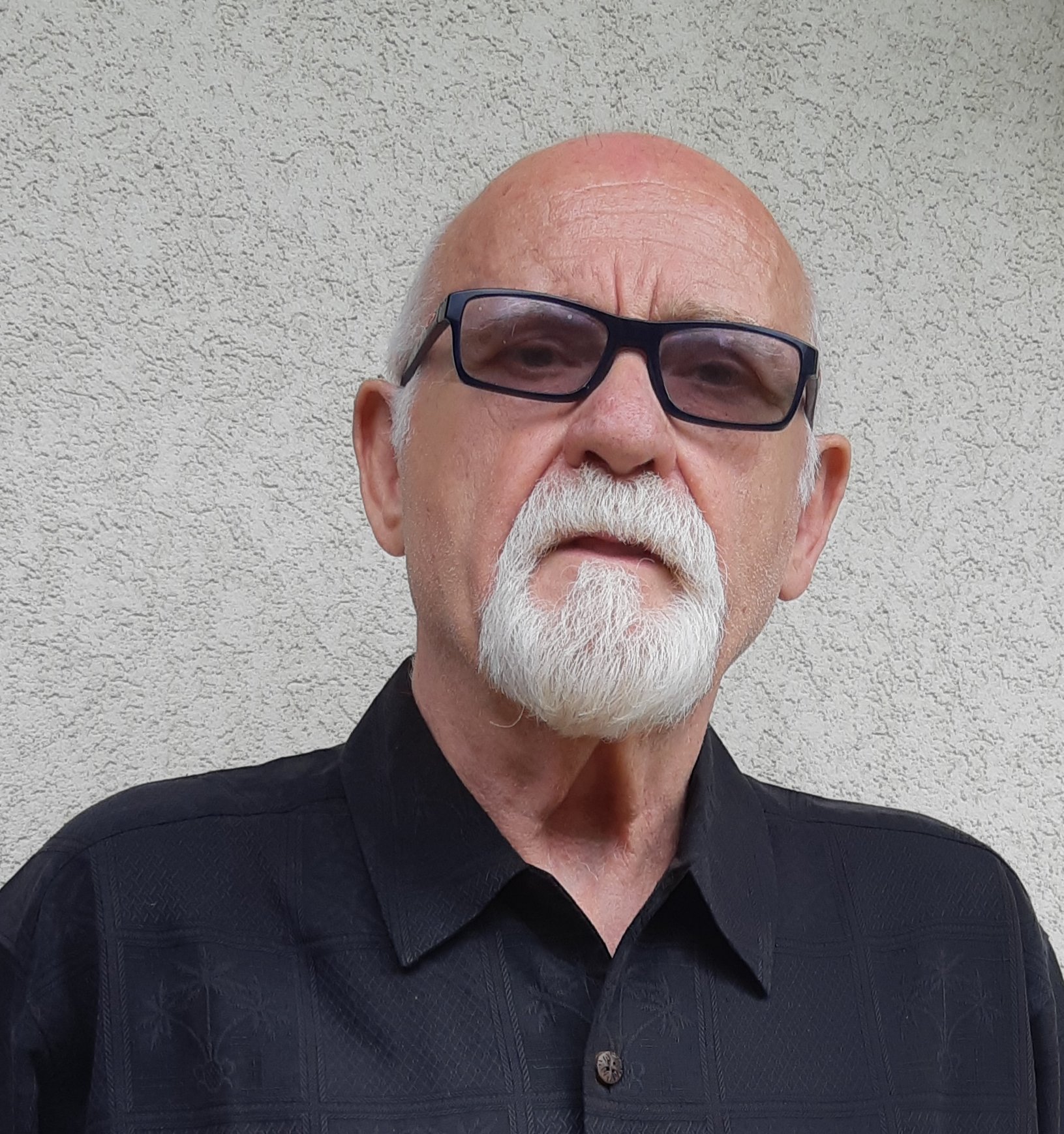
- Born: 18 April 1946 (age 80); Montalto delle Marche, Marche, Italy
- Occupation: Painter sculptor
- Website: http://www.renzoeusebi.it/

Renzo Eusebi (born 18 April 1946 in Montalto delle Marche) is an Italian painter and sculptor of contemporary art. He is co-founder of the artistic movements of Transvisionismo (1995) and GAD (Dialectical Aniconism Group-1997).

== Biography ==
He was born in Patrignone, a hamlet of Montalto Marche on 18 April 1946. In 1962 he attended the artistic high school in Rome and became friends with Sante Monachesi. He engages in the bas-relief in plaster, uses the spatula, creates a series of paintings obtaining a crushed painting. From the 70s to today, he has been present with his works in numerous personal and collective exhibitions and his artistic itineraries. In the 80s, he devoted himself to the search for an abstract surrealist painting, where they intertwine spirals from which geometric shapes of red, black, yellow and blue colors emerge, images and primary colors. In the 90s, he is a founding member of "transvisionism", an artistic movement born in Castell'Arquato (PC) and G.A.D. Dialectical Anicinismo Group, founded in Rome by the critic and art historian Giorgio Di Genova.

== Bibliography ==
- Monograph, Eusebi 1964–1996, Italia: Tieffe, 1996.
- Monograph, 1964 Eusebi '96, scritti di Lino Lazzari, by Lino Lazzari.
- Monograph, Eusebi : 1964–1996, by Lino Lazzari, by Giorgio Segato.
- Monograph, Renzo Eusebi: ritorno alle origini / by Giorgio Di Genova.ISBN 88-85345-05-0.
- Monograph, Renzo Eusebi: opere uniche, dal 18 marzo all'1 aprile 2000.
- Catalog. Bolaffi n° 13, volume 4, Milano, 1978, p. 74.
- Catalog. of Modern Art No. 54, in Giovanni Faccenda, "The Italian Astist from the early twentieth century to today"( Gli Artisti Italiani dal Primo Novecento ad Oggi) Giorgio Mondadori, Milan, 2018, pp. 400. ISBN 978-88-6052-924-4.
- Catalog. of Modern Art No. 55, in Giovanni Faccenda, "The Italian Astist from the early twentieth century to today"( Gli Artisti Italiani dal Primo Novecento ad Oggi) Giorgio Mondadori, Milan, 2019, pp. 322. ISBN 978-88-374-1877-9.
- Catalog. Storia dell'arte italiana del '900 per generazioni. Generazione anni Quaranta, tav. 1697, second volume, by Giorgio Di Genova.
- Exhibition catalog, Colori & Geometrie, SpazioArte 57, critical curating by Marta Lock, Lamezia Terme, 2021. ISBN 978-88-94998-76-4

== Paintings in museums ==
- Museo MAGI 900, Pieve di Cento. Renzo Eusebi, list of museum artists.
- Museo Limen, Renzo Eusebi, OP. N. 08, Vibo Valentia.
- Museo d'Arte Contemporanea Castel di Lama, "ART ON", Renzo Eusebi.
- MAAG Museo Abruzzese Arti Grafiche, Renzo Eusebi, Castel di Ieri.
