= Andreas Poulimenos =

American opera singer

Andreas Poulimenos is a professor of music at Indiana University at the Jacobs School of Music. He has a B.A. and a M.A. from the Boston Conservatory of Music. He sang for years as a bass, but became a baritone following his appointment as a voice teacher at Bowling Green State University. He has made operatic and concert appearances throughout the United States, Canada, Germany, and Switzerland. Poulimenos was the recipient of a Fulbright Scholarship for study in Rome, Italy.
