= Diana Cavallo =

American novelist, educator, playwright, and performer (1931–2017)

- Born: November 3, 1931; Philadelphia, Pennsylvania, U.S.
- Died: June 17, 2017 (aged 85); Springfield, Pennsylvania, U.S.
- Education: University of Pennsylvania
- Spouse: Karl Hagedorn (1922–2005)

Diana Cavallo (1931-2017) was an American novelist, educator, playwright, and performer.

== Biography ==
=== Early life and education ===
Cavallo was born in Philadelphia in 1931, the daughter of Genuino and Josephine (Petraca) Cavallo. She grew up in an Italian neighborhood of South Philadelphia, where she attended public schools. Her grandparents, who lived with the family, spoke the Abruzzese dialect; Cavallo learned Italian from them, and later based two characters in her first novel on them. As a teenager, she moved with her family to Upper Darby Township, Pennsylvania. She attended the University of Pennsylvania and spent time in Florence, Italy, as a Fulbright scholar. She was a member of Phi Beta Kappa society.

=== Career ===
After graduation, Cavallo worked for a year at the Philadelphia State Hospital as a psychiatric social worker; this experience provided the background for her first novel, A Bridge of Leaves (1961). Written in New Hampshire on a MacDowell Colony fellowship, the novel depicts a young man's rite of passage to adulthood. She published a nonfiction book, The Lower East Side: A Portrait in Time, in 1971. Her short stories and other writings have appeared in a variety of journals and anthologies, including Helen Barolini's The Dream Book: An Anthology of Writings by Italian American Women (1985).

After teaching in public schools in Philadelphia and Clifton, New Jersey, and at a private school in Brooklyn, New York, Cavallo taught creative writing at Drexel University and Queens College. From 1969 to 1973, she taught literature and creative writing at the University of Pisa as a Fulbright teaching fellow. Starting in 1980, she taught creative writing at the University of Pennsylvania.

Cavallo wrote fictionalized essays about the neighborhood where she grew up, and performed them as monologues on stages in South Philadelphia. Her one-act play, Family Album, won a competition held by the Ethical Humanist Society of Philadelphia in 2011 and was performed there to a large audience; the play is about two sisters who become involved in controversy after one of them writes a book about their father's suicide.

=== Personal life ===
Cavallo was married to the German-American artist Karl Hagedorn (1922–2005). She died in Springfield, Pennsylvania, on June 17, 2017.
