= Valori =

Valori is an Italian surname. Notable people with the surname include:

- Bice Valori (1927–1980), Italian actress and comedian
- Gino Valori (1890–1961), Italian screenwriter and film director
- Linda Valori (born 1978), Italian singer
- Louis Guy Henri de Valori (1692–1774), French diplomat and aristocrat
- Michele Valori (1923–1979), Italian urban designer and architect
- Valori family, Italian family from Florence

== See also ==
- Valori plastici, Italian magazine
- Valoris, French-Irish racehorse
- Valore (disambiguation)
