= Debra Cheverino =

American conductor, musician and composer

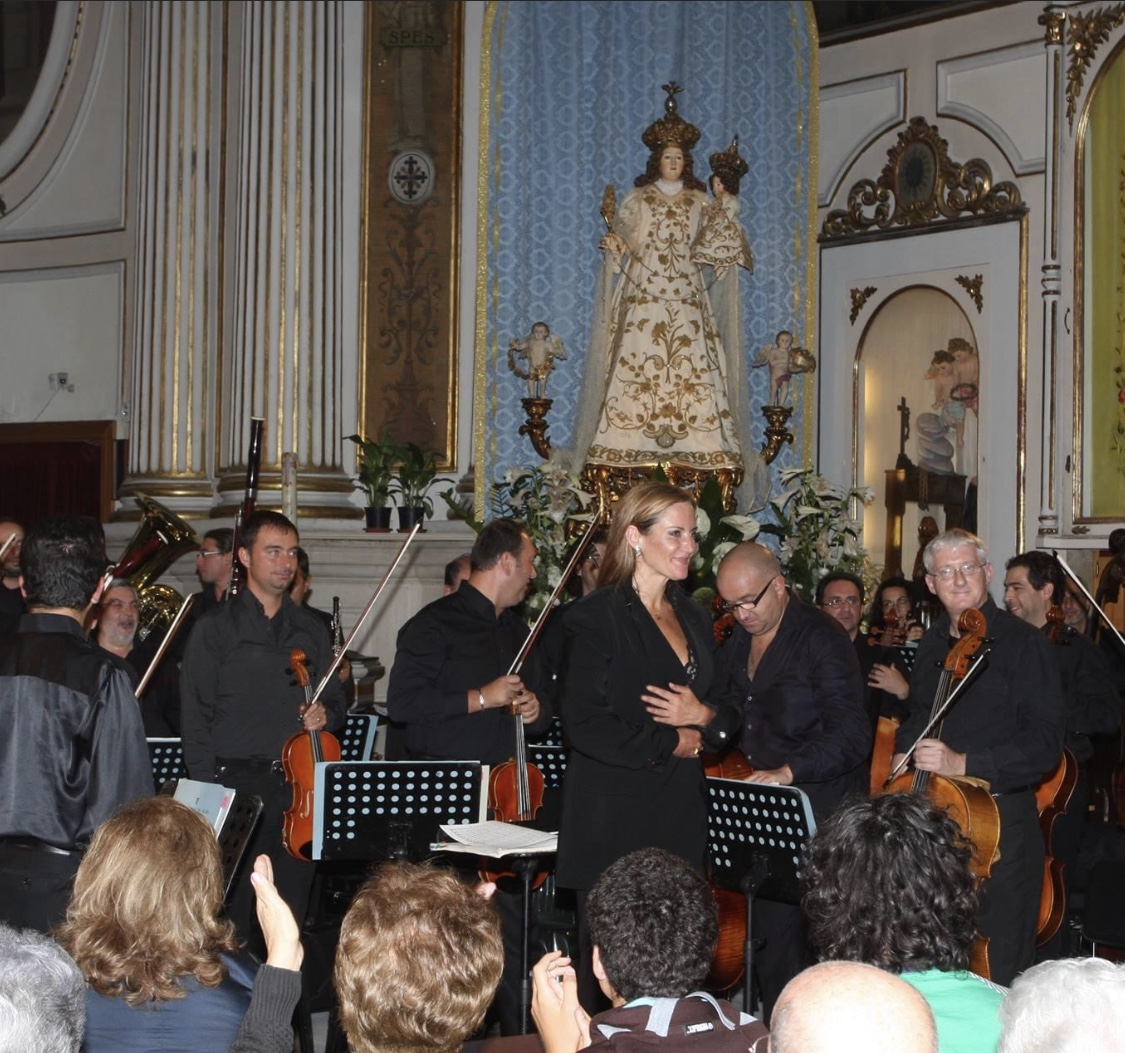
- Cheverino with Orchestra Sinfonica di Bari in 2010
- Born: 22 December 1976 (age 49); Johannesburg, South Africa
- Education: University of Southern California, University of Hartford, Università di Firenze
- Occupation: Conductor
- Years active: 1992–present
- Awards: Fulbright Scholarship

Debra Cheverino (Italian: [devorah ʃɛvɛʀino]; born 22 December 1976) is an international conductor based in Florence, Italy. She is one of only a handful of women conductors in Europe.

== Early career ==
Cheverino was born in Johannesburg, South Africa. By her own account, Cheverino cites her great-grandfather, Richard Arbus, an English pianist and composer based in South Africa and her Italian-American grandmother Maria Grazia Cheverino, a singer and choral conductor in New York as her earliest musical influences.

Cheverino studied piano, voice and composition at conservatory in the greater Los Angeles area. Her first public performance as a conductor was at age 15 in a California state competition where she conducted one of her own compositions. In 1992, Cheverino received a Pavarotti Scholarship from the National Italian American Foundation to finish her studies at conservatory.

In Los Angeles, she was the first woman conductor to study under Mehli Mehta with the American Youth Orchestra, John Barnett at the University of Southern California, and Erwin Acel at the Vienna Musikhochschule. In 1996, she became the assistant conductor of the USC Community Orchestra.

Cheverino went on to receive her music degree with an emphasis in conducting at the University of Southern California. She attended the Conductor's Institute in Connecticut from 1997 to 1999. In 1998, she received a presidential scholarship to pursue a master's in conducting at the University of Hartford under composer Harold Farberman. She also taught music history and music theory as an adjunct professor at the University of Hartford from 1998 to 2000.

In 1998, she initiated the Hartford Community Orchestra and was broadcast on National Public Radio throughout 1998–2000 with monthly concerts offered free to the community of Hartford. During this time, Cheverino began giving concerts abroad with orchestras such as the Varna Philharmonic in Bulgaria.

After finishing her first two degree's, Cheverino returned to Los Angeles in 2000, where she became a Corwin Fellow under conductor Esa-Peka Solonen, with the Los Angeles Philharmonic Honors Orchestra. Contemporarily from 2000 to 2004, she initiated the Pacific Symphony Youth Orchestra in Southern California, an educational outreach program of the Pacific Symphony Orchestra and became its assistant conductor. In 2000, Cheverino became the assistant conductor and then associate conductor of the Los Angeles Mozart Orchestra based in Los Angeles, California under music director Lucinda Carver. In the fall of 2001, Cheverino became the associate conductor of the Asia America Symphony under music director and jazz pianist David Benoit.

== Career and honors ==
In 2001, Cheverino became the first woman ever to win a first prize in an international conducting competition when she won the gold medal in the Florence International Conducting Competition in Florence, Italy. As the main prize for her gold medal, a year's worth of concerts were organized by the competition, whereby Cheverino worked with various orchestras all around Italy. During one of these concerts, Cheverino was noticed by conductor Claudio Abbado, who asked her to come and assist for one year with his youth orchestra the Mozart Orchestra. In 2005–2007, she received a second Fulbright grant to assist Zubin Mehta at the Maggio Musicale Fiorentina. In 2007, Cheverino conducted the "Donne in Musica" concert in honor of Zubin Mehta with the Solisti Fiorentini di Maggio Musicale Fiorentina recreating the "orchestra di donne" tradition of late Renaissance opera in Florence in homage to the Camerata di Bardi and Francesca Caccini.

In 2013, Cheverino received the AIDDA Toscana Women's Leader Award and in 2014 became an honorary member of the Associazione Donne nelle Professioni di Ordini e Collegi.

In 2018 for the 70th anniversary of the Fulbright program in Italy, Cheverino was honored by Ambassador of the United States to Italy Lewis M. Eisenberg for her contributions and accomplishments as a musician.
