= Susan Harbage Page =

American photographer and visual artist (born 1959)

Susan Harbage Page (born 1959) is an American photographer and visual artist who explores issues of race, gender, and immigration through photography, site-specific Installation Art, painting, and drawing. She is the recipient of numerous awards and fellowships and is assistant professor in the Department of Women's and Gender Studies at the University of North Carolina at Chapel Hill.

== Biography ==
Page was born in 1959 in Greenville, Ohio. She grew up in North Carolina and lives in Durham, North Carolina.

Page received her B.M. and M.M. (saxophone performance) from Michigan State University and an M.F.A. (photography) from the San Francisco Art Institutein 2002 as well as a Certificate of Knowledge of the Italian language from the University for Foreigners Perugia in Perugia, Italy. In 1992, Page was awarded a Fulbright Scholarship to study in Italy.

Page has exhibited in Bulgaria, China, England France, Germany, Italy, Israel, and the United States.

== Border Project ==
In 2007, Page created "Objects from the Borderlands: The U.S.–Mexico 'Anti–Archive.". It is a series of photographic, site-specific, and performance-based works about immigration into the United States from Mexico.

Many photographs in "Objects" depict possessions that migrants left behind as they have crossed the border at Rio Grande River near the Matamoros–Brownsville Metropolitan Area. These abandoned items include deflated inner tubes, wallets, bullet casings, personal identification cards, and articles of clothing. Page photographs the found objects in their original context, then gathers the items to photograph them later in a studio setting before tagging and storing the objects. For Page, they became "ordinary things possessed with extraordinary associations of flight, hope, panic, determination, and fear."

Other photographs in "Objects" depict the natural landscape along the border, with some images documenting physical traces left behind by people who crossed the border. This project has been exhibited at the FedEx Global Education Center at the University of North Carolina at Chapel Hill (2011) and was selected for was selected for the journal Southern Spaces 2010 series "Migration, Mobility, Exchange, and the US South."

== Postcards from Home ==
"Postcards from Home" is a series of photographs that Page created to explore racism.

Page created Ku Klux Klan-style garments using contemporary fabrics which are worn by her sitters. Photographs from "Postcards" appeared in a solo exhibit at the XIT Gallery at the American InterContinental University, School of Visual Communications (August 27 – September 21, 2007).

== Publications ==
- Susan Harbage Page : lingering portraits, Gettysburg College Pennsylvania, 2008.
- Postcards from home, Sumter County Gallery of Art, South Carolina, 2007.
- Involuntary Memories: Blanden Memorial Museum of Art, Iowa 2006.
- The Ties that Bind, Greenville County Museum of Art and the Emrys Foundation, 2003.
- Standing Still, ATA Center for Contemporary Art, Sofia, Bulgaria, 2001.
