= Spencer M. Di Scala =

American historian

Spencer M. Di Scala is an American historian who specializes in the history of modern Europe, particularly the history of Italian socialism.

== Biography ==
Di Scala was born in Manhattan, New York and grew up in both Manhattan and Queens. He received his B.A. from Queens College and his M.A. and Ph.D. from Columbia University. As a graduate student he was awarded two Fulbright grants to Milan, Italy to do research on his dissertation, which later became his first book. As a professor he won a Fulbright fellowship to Rome to perform research for his second book. Di Scala started teaching at the University of Kentucky and came to UMass Boston in 1970. He has been a full professor since 1986, and in 1997 the university named him research professor.

He has taught courses in Western Civilization to Italian and European history of the nineteenth and twentieth centuries, as well as graduate courses on a variety of specialized topics. He introduced online courses to the history department, teaches regularly online, and won the 2007 University Continuing Education Association's Award for Excellence in Teaching; in 2006 he won the same association's regional award for innovation in teaching.
