= Montalto Cathedral =

Church in Montalto delle Marche, Italy

Coordinates: 43°13′07″N 13°27′33″E

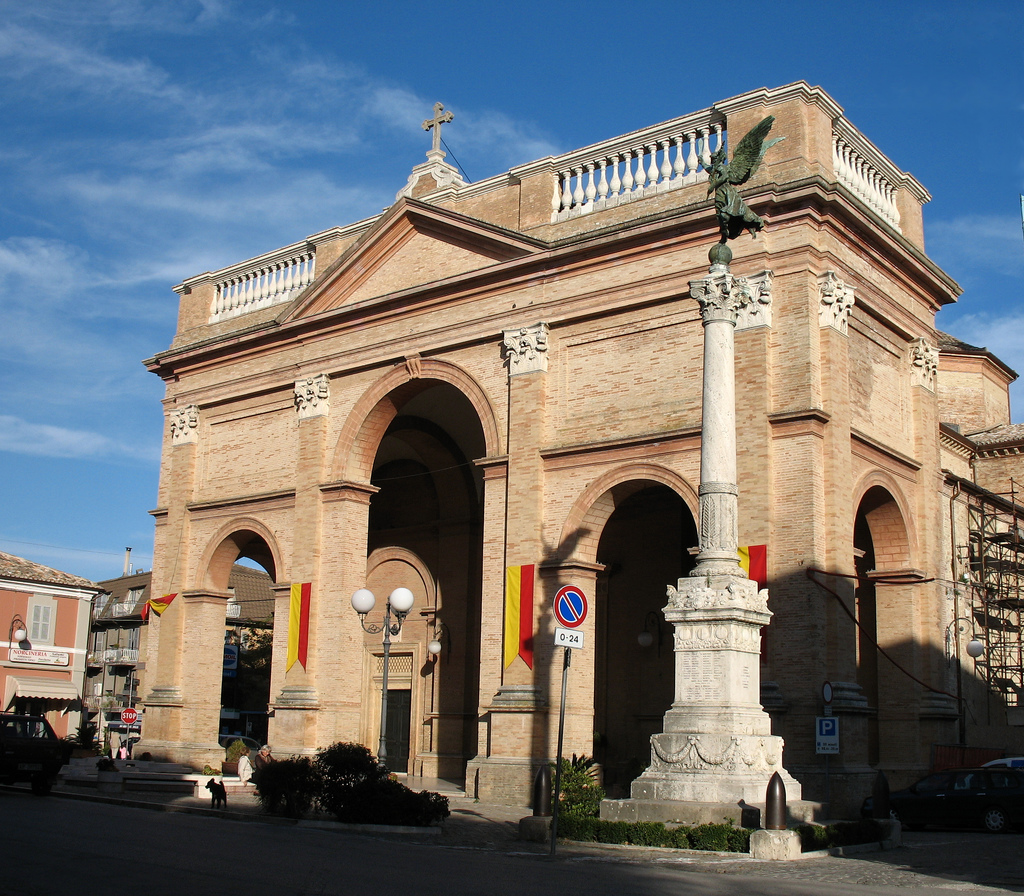
Katedral ng Montalto.

Montalto Cathedral, otherwise the Basilica of Santa Maria Assunta e San Vito (Italian: Concattedrale di Santa Maria Assunta di Montalto delle Marche), is the principal Roman Catholic church of the town of Montalto delle Marche, province of Ascoli Piceno in the region of Le Marche, Italy. It is dedicated to the Assumption of the Virgin Mary (and to Saint Vitus). The church was formerly, from 1586, the episcopal seat of the Diocese of Montalto. When the diocese was subsumed into the present Diocese of San Benedetto del Tronto–Ripatransone–Montalto in 1986, Montalto Cathedral became a co-cathedral in the new diocese. It was created a basilica minor by Pope Paul VI in 1965.

== History ==
The diocese of Montalto was founded in 1586 by Pope Sixtus V, who erected the present crypt of the church. The pope had received his religious training in the convent of San Francesco in the town. Some authors state the Pope intended to create a pilgrimage route starting with the Basilica of Loreto, which contained the putative site of the Incarnation of Jesus, and add to this church of Montalto the structures from the Holy Sepulchre in Jerusalem, the putative site of the Burial of Jesus, purchased via a new crusade, and arcing west to Rome, where Christ's posthumous vicars reign. However, no such crusade ever materialized. The crypt was completed early and intended to house the structures from the Holy Sepulchre. It now houses a sculptural group of the Deposition by Giorgio Paci. Construction of the church continued for centuries. Mass was only carried out by the end of the 17th century. The final Neoclassical style portico-facade and the octagonal bell tower at the rear of the church were designed by Luigi Poletti in the 19th century. It was made a minor basilica in 1965, with a baptistry in 1967, and had stained glass added in 1990s. In front of the church is a small piazza with two hemicircle fountain pools and to the side a column topped by a winged figure, dedicated to the fallen in the wars. The episcopal palace across the street also holds a diocesan museum.

The painting called the Madonna di Montalto was commissioned by Cardinal Alessandro Peretti from the painter Annibale Carracci but the painting never was reached the town and remains in Bologna. The baptismal font was sculpted in 1652.

The tall brick façade has an eclectic Neoclassical design with three round arches almost suggesting a triumphal arch, flanked by pilasters with Corinthian capitals, but for the small triangular tympanum, nestled underneath a balustrade. The interior reflects the façade with a taller barrel vaulted central nave and two lower aisles separated by heavy columns and a total of 12 lateral chapels. The vault of the nave was frescoed in panels by the 19th-century painter Luigi Fontana. To the right of the entrance, the first chapel serves as the baptistry. It has a canvas depicting the Baptism of Christ (1967) painted by Michelangelo Bedini in baroque fashion. The chapel closest to the altar on the left has a canvas depicting the Virgin with the Town of Montalto and Saints Vito and Venanzo (1691) by Pietro Lucatelli. Two other altarpieces and nave frescoes are painted by Fontana.
