= Richard Karpen =

Richard Karpen (born April 23, 1957) is an American composer of electronic and acoustic music. He is also known for developing computer applications for music and composition.

== Biography ==
Born in New York City, Karpen studied composition with Georghe Costinescu and Charles Dodge. He received his doctorate in composition from Stanford University, where he also worked at the Center for Computer Research in Music and Acoustics (CCRMA). He joined the Composition faculty of the School of Music at the University of Washington in 1989. In 1994 he founded CARTAH, a center for computer-based research in the arts and humanities and the Center for Digital Arts and Experimental Media (DXARTS) at the University of Washington, serving as its initial Director from 2001– 2006. He has also served as Divisional Dean for Research in the College of Arts and Sciences at the University of Washington. From 2009 to 2020 he served as Director of the School of Music.

While he is primarily known for his work in electronic media, Karpen has also composed symphonic and chamber works for a wide variety of ensembles. He has composed works for many leading international soloists such as soprano Judith Bettina, violist Garth Knox, trombonist Stuart Dempster, flutists Laura Chislett and Jos Zwaanenberg, oboist Alex Klein, and guitarist Stefan Ostersjo. Along with numerous concert and radio performances, his works have been set to dance by groups such as the Royal Danish Ballet and the Guandong Dance Company of China.

Karpen has been the recipient of grants and awards from the National Endowment for the Arts, the ASCAP Foundation, the Bourges Competition in France, and the Luigi Russolo Foundation in Italy. Fellowships and grants for work outside of the U.S. include a Fulbright to Italy, a residency at IRCAM in Paris, and a Leverhulme Visiting Fellowship to the United Kingdom.

== Selected works ==
- Mu Song (1983)
- The Vision (1985)
- Eclipse (1986)
- Exchange (1987)
- Il Nome (1987)
- Pour la Terre (1989)
- Saxonomy (1990)
- Terra Infirma (1992)
- The Other (1992)
- The Silence of Time (1993)
- Life-Study #1 (1993)
- Life-Studies 3–5 (1995–1996)
- No Man's Land (1998)
- Sotto/Sopra (1999)
- Pericolose, un giorno bellezze (2000)
- Camera Cantorum (2000)
- Anterior View of an Interior with Reclining Trombonist: The Conservation of Energy (2003)
- Solo/Tutti: Variations on an Irrational Number for amplified viola and real-time computer processing (2002)
- Aperture for amplified viola and interactive electronics (2006)
- Strandlines (2007)

== Discography ==
Il Nome. Judith Bettina, soprano. Le Chant du Monde, CD, LDC 278049/50 and Wergo Schallplatten, CD, WER 2027-2.
Denouement. Centaur Records, CD, CRC 2144, 1992.
Saxonomy. Michael Brockman, saxophones. Centaur CD, CRC 2144, 1992.
Terra infirma. Neuma CD, Electroacoustic Music III, 1994.
Mass. empreintes DIGITALes, CD, IMED 9837, 1998.
Sotto/Sopra. Eric Rynes, violin. Centaur CD, CDCM, Vol. 31, 2001.
Camera Cantorum. Mnemnosyne Musique, CD, 2002.
Solo/Tutti; Exchange; Life Studies #1 and #5; Anterior View of an Interior with Reclining Trombonist: The Conservation of Energy. Garth Knox, viola, Stuart Dempster, trombone, Jos Zwaanenberg, flute, William O. Smith, clarinet. Centaur CD, CRC 2716, 2005.
The Other and Camera Cantorum. Capstone DVD CPS-8769, 2007.
Aperture. Melia Watras, viola. Fleur de Son, CD FDS-57992, 2008. Strandlines, for guitar and live electronics. Stefan Ostersjo, guitar. Caprice CD dbCD140, 2011.
Indigo Mist. Vu/Karpen Project. Rarenoise Records, CD and LP, 2014.
Aperture II and Elliptic. Live recordings of two works with the JACK Quartet and the Six Tones. Neuma Records CD NSR-1000423, 2016.
Impulsive Illumiunations (as pianist). Origin Records CD 82725, 2016.
Bicinium for violin and viola. Lim and Watras. Sono Luminus CD, 2016.
Tertium Quid, for violin, viola, piano. Lim, Watras, Choi. Planet M Records, 2019.
Nam Mai, Vietnamese instruments and string orchestra. The Six Tones and the Seattle Symphony, Orchestra. NEUMA CD 450-119,. 2019.,
Strandlines, for guitar and live electronics. Stefan Ostersjo, guitar. NEUMA CD 450-119.

== Bibliography ==
- Barrière, Françoise. 1997. "Réflexions libres sur l'analyse en musique électroacoustique/Thoughts on analysis in electroacoustic music", translated by Gerald Bennett. In Analyse en musique electroacoustique: Actes II des travaux 1996 de l'Académie Internationale de Musique Electroacoustique, Bourges/Analysis in electroacoustic music: Proceedings volume II of the works of the International Academy of Electroacoustic music, Bourges 1996, edited by Gerald Bennett, 12–19. Bourges: Mnémosyne. ISBN 2-9511363-0-7.
- Karpen, Richard. 2000. "Csound's Phase Vocoder and Extensions". In The Csound Book, edited by Richard Boulanger, 541–60. Boston: MIT PRess. ISBN 0-262-52261-6.
- Karpen, Richard. 2003. "An Interview with James Dashow". Computer Music Journal 27: no.2.
- Winkler, Todd. 1991. "Summer Computer Music Festival, Frost Amphitheatre, Stanford University, Palo Alto, California, USA". Computer Music Journal 15, no. 3 (Autumn): 105–107.
