= Eugene DeVerdi =

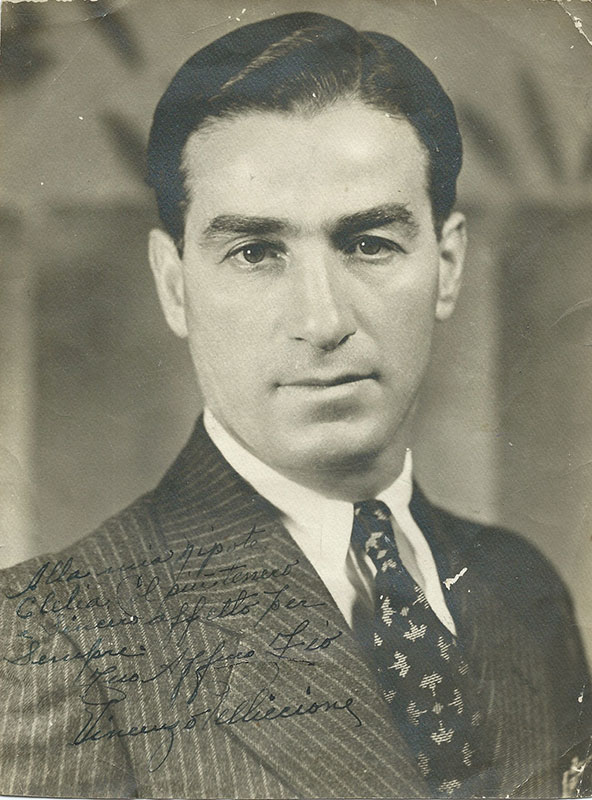
- Photo of Vincenzo Pelliccione with a dedication to his niece Mrs. Clelia; Pelliccione Carnebianca
- Born: 21 June 1893; Magliano de' Marsi, Abruzzo, Italy
- Died: 20 June 1978 (aged 84); Rome, Lazio, Italy

Vincenzo Pelliccione, a.k.a. Eugene DeVerdi (Rosciolo dei Marsi, Italy June 21, 1893 - Rome June 20, 1978) was the historic and famous Charlie Chaplin Official double.

== Career ==
In 1915 he emigrated to the US; in 1929 he went to Hollywood, where he worked as painter and poet; after that, he worked in theatre with Mae West and on the sets of Buster Keaton and Charlie Chaplin.

He took part in the film It Happened in Hollywood (1937) along with the other officers of famous actors stunt historical. Vincenzo Pelliccione was known inventor of lights and machines for special effects for Hollywood movies (Los Angeles USA) and Cinecittà and Dino De Laurentiis's Studios (Rome, ITALY) making a significant contribution to remain memorable films including Teresa (film 1951), Twenty Thousand leagues under the sea (1954) for which the Disney won the 1955 Oscar for Best Special effects, Ben Hur (1959), Cleopatra (1963). From 1968 to 1978 he collaborated with his nephew, the artist Enzo Carnebianca, and worked in Cinecittà studios and in the Studios of Dino De Laurentiis. It rests in the cemetery Rosciolo dei Marsi.

== Book ==
- The Film of Fay Wray of Roy Kinnard and Tony Crnkovich, page 152
