= William Westney =

William Frank Westney (born 1947) is an American classical pianist and retired professor of music. Westney was the top piano prize-winner of the Geneva International Music Competition, and he appeared thereafter as soloist with such major orchestras as l'Orchestre de la Suisse Romande and the Houston, San Antonio and New Haven Symphonies. Westney holds a Bachelor of Arts degree from Queens College in New York and a Masters and Doctorate in performance from Yale University, all with highest honors. During his study in Italy under a Fulbright grant he was the only American winner in auditions held by Radiotelevisione Italiana. Solo recital appearances included New York's Lincoln Center, the National Gallery and Phillips Collection in Washington, D.C., St. John's, Smith Square in London, National Public Radio ("Performance Today"), and a U.S. State Department tour of Italy. His pianism has been described as “formidable” (New York Times), “rich and distinctive” (Avanti, Milan) and “glorious” (Straits Times, Singapore). Critics have praised his recordings of solo and chamber works for CRI and Musical Heritage Society, and Newsweek.

An internationally noted educator until his retirement in May 2020, William Westney held two endowed positions at Texas Tech University – Paul Whitfield Horn Distinguished Professor and Browning Artist-in-Residence – and has received the university's highest honor for education, the Chancellor's Council Distinguished Teaching Award. He received a grant from the U.S. State Department's Fulbright "Senior Specialist" program (Council for International Exchange of Scholars), to teach throughout Korea and China in 2006.

== Publications ==
- Westney, William (2006). The Perfect Wrong Note: Learning to Trust Your Musical Self. Hal Leonard Corporation. ISBN 978-1-57467-145-2.

== External references ==
William Westney website
