= Patrignone, Montalto delle Marche =

Patrignone
- Frazione
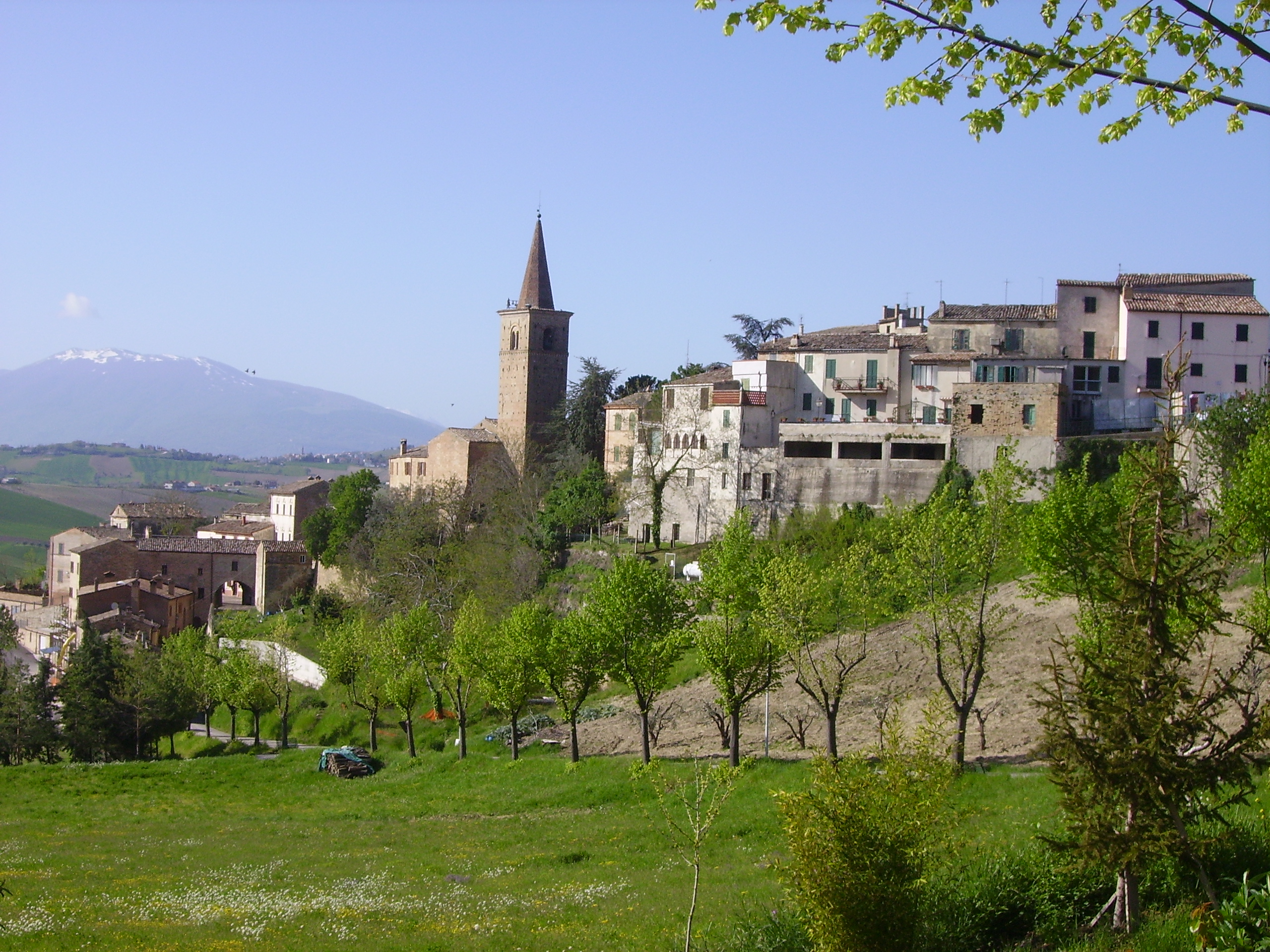

- Location of Patrignone in Italy
- Coordinates: 42°58′49″N 13°36′33″E
- Country: Italy
- Region: Marche
- Province: Ascoli Piceno (AP)
- Comune: Montalto delle Marche
- Elevation: 394 m (1,293 ft)

Population (2011)
  - Total: 130
- Time zone: UTC+1 (CET)
  - Summer (DST): UTC+2 (CEST)

Patrignone is a village in Marche, central Italy, administratively a frazione of the comune of Montalto delle Marche, province of Ascoli Piceno. At the time of the 2001 census its population was 130.

Patrignone is about 2 km from Montalto and 33 km from Ascoli Piceno.
