= Francesco Grillo =

Italian economist

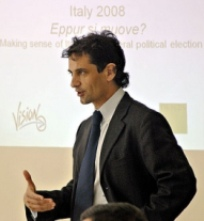
Francesco Grillo

Francesco Grillo is an Italian economist and manager.

He is visiting fellow at the European University Institute in Fiesole, affiliate Professor at Scuola Superiore Sant'Anna in Pisa and teaches at the summer school of University of International Business Economics in Beijing.

Francesco is Managing Director of Vision & Value, a strategy consulting boutique and he advises major institutions (including the European Commission and Italian Ministry of Economy) and multinationals.

He is also director of Vision Think Tank which convenes two yearly major conferences: one on the future of Europe in Siena and the other one on global governance of climate change (in the Dolomite area). His professional and research interests are around how internet is changing industries and political systems.

Francesco is also columnist for Il Messaggero, Corriere della Sera, Linkiesta and the Guardian. He is often interviewed by international media like the Economist and he is regular guest on La7, SkyTG24 and RaiNews24.

== Education and early career ==
After graduating in economics from LUISS Guido Carli, he got an MBA from Boston University as a Fullbirght scholar. In 1995 he became an associate at McKinsey, where he applied tools typically used in multinational companies within other contexts, such as the evaluation of public policies.

Having left McKinsey, Grillo founded consultancy firm Vision & Value and think tank Vision. Both companies focus on the effects of the Internet industrial revolution on businesses, cities, and governments.

In 2012, Grillo earned his PhD in "Political Economy" at London School of Economics and Political Science with a thesis on the factors that enable growth across different regions in the new millennium. Grillo's thesis contests the conventional hypothesis that greater R&D expenditure necessarily generates a more rapid growth of GDP. While at Oxford Internet Institute and St Antony's College at University of Oxford and at Scuola Superiore Sant’Anna in Pisa, Grillo continued this line of research along with one ranging from pensions to regional development.

== Research ==
Grillo's research focuses on the so-called “innovation paradox", first observed by Robert Solow in 1987. Observing data available at the time, Solow observed how the rates of growth of GDP had decreased despite the exponential increase of the quantity of information accessible at any given moment. Grillo identifies the cause of the paradox in what he terms the “technological obsolescence” of liberal democracies. To illustrate the reasons of the crisis, the economist traces a historical parallel between Internet and the invention of the press by Johannes Gutenberg: both media disintermediated the monopolistic reproduction of information. Since a redistribution of power tends to follow a reallocation of information, 21st Century liberal democracies are in crisis: they no longer possess the tools to govern Internet-triggered societal changes.

In comparing Western countries to China, Grillo notes that the Communist country has been more able to govern a technological revolution begun in the West. Meanwhile, Western countries have become more risk-averse, thus widening the gap in terms of societal impact of technologies with China. While similar in some regards to Mariana Mazzucato's work on the Entrepreneurial State, Grillo reflects more on the impact of the Internet on the form of the State itself. Through this comparison with China, Grillo proposes ways to give back to Western democracies the chance to use information to increase the efficiency and efficacy of government.

== Published works ==
- Democracy and Growth in the Twenty-first Century, Springer Nature, London, 2019
- Lezioni Cinesi, Solferino Libri, Milan, 2019
- Innovation, Democracy and Efficiency: Exploring the Innovation Puzzle within the European Union’s Regional Development Policies, Palgrave, London, 2016
- Public Investments in R&D as a Tool for Regional Economic Development (PhD thesis)
- Merits, Problems and Paradoxes of Regional Innovation Policies, (2011) Local Economy Volume 26, Paragraphs 6–7, pp. 544–561.
- Grillo, F., & Nanetti, R. (2020). Innovation and democracy: The twin paradoxes. Area Development and Policy, 5(3), 233-255.
- Grillo, F., & Nanetti, R. (2022). Flexible Transnational Electoral Constituencies. European Liberal Forum, Policy Paper 11.

== Bibliography ==
- Abramovitz, M. (1986), Catching Up, Forging Ahead, and Falling Behind, in The Journal of Economic History, Cambridge University Press, Vol. 46, No. 2, The Tasks of Economic History, pp. 385–406
- Ahmad, N., Ribarsky, J., and Reinsdorf, M. (2017), Can Potential Mismeasurement of the Digital Economy Explain the Post-Crisis Slowdown in GDP and Productivity Growth?, in OECD Statistics Working Papers, No. 09, OECD Publishing, Paris
- Eggertsson, G. B., Mehrotra, N. R., and Summers, L. H. (2016), Secular Stagnation in the Open Economy, in American Economic Review, 106(5), pp. 503–507
- Gordon, R. J. (2016), The Rise and Fall of American Growth: The U.S. Standard of Living since the Civil War, Princeton University Press
- Landes D. S. (1969), The Unbound Prometheus: Technological Change and Industrial Development in Western Europe from 1750 to the Present, Cambridge University Press
- Mazzucato, M. (2013), The Entrepreneurial State: Debunking Public vs. Private Sector Myths, Anthem Press, London
- Solow, R. (2005), Reflections on Growth Theory in Handbook of Economic Growth, in Aghion, P. and Durlauf, S. (Eds.), Elsevier, Amsterdam
- Yong-Hwan N. and Kyeongwon Y. (2008), Internet, Inequality, and Growth, in Journal of Policy Modeling, Vol. 30, Issue 6, 2008, pp. 1005–1016
