= History of Italian Art of the Twentieth Century =

History of Italian Art of the Twentieth Century (Storia dell'arte italiana del '900) is an art encyclopedia written between 1981 and 2010 by critic and art historian Giorgio Di Genova published by Edizioni Bora in Bologna.

== Description ==
The encyclopedia, which discusses both painting and sculpture, traces the critical profiles of artists who have characterized twentieth century Italian art. The content is organized on a biographical basis, although the text is composed of historical-themed chapters and not individual entries. The distribution of content between the various volumes takes place on a generational basis: each volume deals with facts and personalities that have characterized the different generations of artists, divided by decades: from the "Historical Masters generation" (of which the personalities born in the course of the nineteenth century but still active in the twentieth century) comes the "forties generation" (of which artists born between 1940 and 1949). This entirely peculiar setting has the advantage of creating in the vast biographical panorama the analyzed criteria for distinguishing and organizing objective and controlled content.

== Drafting ==
In Geneva, at the beginning of the 1980s, Genoa began writing what later became volumes 4, 5 and 6 on three exhibitions on Italian artists born in the twenties (1981), ten years (1982) and First decade (1985) of the twentieth century. Since 1993, publisher Bora of Bologna has started publishing encyclopedia volumes.

At the beginning of the eighties, on the occasion of three exhibitions on Italian artists born in the 1920s (1981), the 1910s (1982) and the first decade (1985) of the twentieth century, Di Genova began drafting the contents of what would later become volumes 4, 5, and 6 of the encyclopedia. Starting in 1993, the publisher Bora of Bologna began the publication of the volumes of the encyclopedia.

In 1999 Di Genova was among the founders of MAGI '900, the museum in Pieve di Cento, which aims to set up an anthological collection of 20th century Italian art, becoming the museum's equivalent to the encyclopedic contents of the History of Art.

== Contents ==
The work is divided into seven volumes. It features five thousand artists, with over thirty-five thousand names listed in the analytical index. There are reproductions, in color and black and white, of about ten thousand works.

The work plan is as follows:

- Volume 1: Generating Historical Masters
  - Tomo I (1993, ISBN 88-85345-24-7 )
  - Tomo II (1994, ISBN 88-85345-36-0 )
  - Tomo III (1995, ISBN 88-85345-43-3 )
- Volume 2: First Decade Generation (1996, ISBN 88-85345-55-7 )
- Volume 3: Generation Years Ten (1990, ISBN 88-85345-00-X )
- Volume 4: Generation of the Twenties (1991, ISBN 88-85345-10-7 )
- Volume 5: Generation of the Thirties (2000, ISBN 88-85345-81-6 )
- Volume 6: Generation of the Forties
  - Tomo I (2007, ISBN 978-88-88600-39-0 )
  - Tomo II (2009, ISBN 978-88-88600-54-3 )
- Volume 7: General Index (2010, ISBN 978-88-88600-55-0 )
