= Michele Bugliesi =

Italian professor

- Born: 1962 (age 63–64); Udine, Italy
- Scientific career
- Fields: Computer science
- Institutions: Ca' Foscari University of Venice

Michele Bugliesi (born in Udine in 1962) is Full Professor in Computer Science in the Ca' Foscari University of Venice. He has been elected Rector of this University for the mandate 2014-2015 to 2019-2020.

== Scientific activity ==
Michele Bugliesi works on analysis and formal systems in informatics, with publications on models of communications and logic programming.
