= Paolo Valore =

Italian philosopher, academic (1972)

- Born: 10 June 1972; Milan, Lombardy, Italy

Education
- Education: University of Milan

Philosophical work
- Era: 20th-/21st-century philosophy
- Region: Western philosophy
- Main interests: metaphysics (ontology) general and the ontological implications of formal theories. Projects of artificial languages and auxiliary languages

Paolo Valore (Milan, 10 June 1972) is an Italian philosopher and academic who deals with metaphysics, general ontology and the ontological implications of formal theories. He is also interested in projects of artificial languages and auxiliary languages.

== Studies and research ==
Graduated in Philosophy in 1997 at University of Milan, in 2000 he obtained his PhD with a study on Reference, representation and reality in Hilary Putnam . After a year of specialization at King's College London, in 2002 he became researcher at the Department of Philosophy of the University of Milan, where he taught History of contemporary philosophy. His first production was mainly devoted to studies on nineteenth and twentieth century philosophy and the rehabilitation of a neo transcendentalist perspective especially in metaphysics. He participated in the founding group of magazine Problemata. Quaderni di Filosofia , of which he was editor in chief.

Since 2004, when the faculty of Industrial Engineering of the Politecnico di Milano entrusted him with a course in "Truth and correspondence theory", his research has shifted to increasingly theoretical themes, linked to analytic philosophy, metaphysics and analytic ontology. In 2006 he organized and curated the project Topics on general and formal ontology , which took shape in the homonymous volume. He then becomes professor aggregate of History of Contemporary Metaphysics at the University of Milan, of Theoretical Philosophy at the Polytechnic with courses dedicated to formal ontology and, in 2010–2011, of Philosophy of Social Objects (social ontology) at the Luigi Bocconi Commercial University in Milan.

In 2010 he founded with Massimo Rizzardini and Federico Gobbo the multilingual newspaper InKoj. Interlingvistikaj Kajeroj, free access journal of "study and academic discussion on artificial languages", of which he is director. He was a member of the international research group EUROCORES (European Collaborative Research) funded by the European Science Foundation and since 2010 he is the head of the project "Classical Paradigms and Theoretical Foundations in Contemporary Research on Formal and Material Ontology ”for the EuroScholars USA (European Undergraduates Research Opportunities) program. In 2011 he worked in the United States, at the Philosophy Department of New York University, on his formal ontology research project for which he won a sponsorship Fulbright in the Fulbright Visiting Scholar category. He collaborates with the History of Philosophy Magazine , is in the scientific committee of the magazines Materials of Aesthetics , Italian Review of Analytical Philosophy Junior and Multilingualism and Society and is director of the series of philosophy "Biblioteca di Problemata" (LED publisher of Milan) and "Ratio. Studies and texts of contemporary philosophy" (Polimetrica publisher of Monza).

== Main publications ==
=== Monographs ===
- Trascendentale e idea di ragione. Studio sulla fenomenologia banfiana, Firenze, La Nuova Italia, 1999. ISBN 88-221-3282-3.
- Rappresentazione, riferimento e realtà. Studio su Hilary Putnam, Torino, Thélème, 2001. ISBN 88-87419-36-1.
- L'inventario del mondo. Guida allo studio dell'ontologia, Torino, Utet, 2008. ISBN 978-88-6008-214-5.
- La sentenza di Isacco. Come dire la verità senza essere realisti, Milano-Udine, Mimesis, 2012. ISBN 978-88-575-1231-0.
- Fundamentals of Ontological Commitment, Berlin, de Gruyter, 2016. ISBN 978-3-11-045845-9.

=== Curated books ===
- Antonio Banfi, Platone. Lezioni 1937-38 (a cura di Paolo Valore), Milano, Unicopli, 2000. ISBN 88-400-0623-0.
- Paolo Valore (a cura di), Forma dat esse rei. Studi su razionalità e ontologia, Milano, Led, 2003. ISBN 88-7916-215-2.
- Paolo Valore (a cura di), Ars experientiam recte intelligendi. Saggi filosofici, Monza, Polimetrica, 2004. ISBN 88-7699-009-7.
- Willard Van Orman Quine, Da un punto di vista logico. Saggi logico-filosofici (edizione italiana di From a logical point of view a cura di Paolo Valore, con presentazione di Giulio Giorello e Renato Pettoello), Milano, Raffaello Cortina, 2004. ISBN 88-7078-885-7.
- Paolo Valore (a cura di), Topics on General and Formal Ontology, Monza, Polimetrica, 2006. ISBN 978-88-7699-028-1 (ISBN 978-88-7699-029-8 come eBook).
- Paolo Valore (a cura di), Materiali per lo studio dei linguaggi artificiali nel Novecento, Milano, Cuem, 2006. ISBN 978-88-6001-092-6.
- Simona Chiodo e Paolo Valore (a cura di), Questioni di metafisica contemporanea, Milano, Il Castoro, 2007. ISBN 978-88-8033-394-4.
- Renato Pettoello e Paolo Valore (a cura di), Willard Van Orman Quine, Milano, Franco Angeli, 2009. ISBN 978-88-568-0720-2. Pubblicato contemporaneamente anche come numero monografico della Rivista di storia della filosofia, n. 1, 2009, per il centenario della nascita di Quine.
- Paolo Valore e Federico Gobbo (a cura di), Artificial Languages. Themes in linguistics and philosophy, Monaco di Baviera, Grin Verlag, 2010. ISBN 978-3-640-64607-4 (ISBN 978-3-640-64599-2 come eBook). Pubblicato anche, con il titolo Interlinguistica e filosofia dei linguaggi artificiali, come numero monografico per la prima uscita del giornale accademico multilingue InKoj. Interlingvistikaj Kajeroj.
- Paolo Valore (a cura di), Multilingualism. Language, Power, and Knowledge, Pisa, Edistudio, 2011. ISBN 978-88-7036-809-3.

=== University lecture notes ===
- La categoria di sostanza in Aristotele, Milano, Cuem, 1999. ISBN 88-6001-658-4.
- Introduzione al dibattito contemporaneo sulla distinzione tra analitico e sintetico, Milano. Cuem, 2000. ISBN 88-6001-692-4.
- Questioni di ontologia quineana, Milano, Cusl, 2001. ISBN 88-8132-227-7.
- La struttura logico-analitica dell'ontologia herbartiana, Milano, Cusl, 2002. ISBN 88-8132-531-4. Nuova edizione corretta e aggiornata: 2008, ISBN 978-88-8132-555-9.
- Laboratorio di ontologia analitica, Milano, Cusl, 2003. ISBN 88-8132-266-8.
- Verità e teoria della corrispondenza, Milano, Cusl, 2004. ISBN 88-8132-345-1.
- Philosophy of Social Objects, Milano, Bocconi, 2011.

=== Bibliographies ===
- Ontologia, Milano, Unicopli, 2004. ISBN 88-400-0986-8.
- Verità, Milano, Unicopli, 2005. ISBN 88-400-0937-X.

=== Essays and articles ===
- "How to Consider the Twin Earth Experiment", in Acme, 57 (2004), pp. 307–311.
- "Idealizzazione della verità e coerentismo. Due perplessità sul realismo della 'seconda ingenuità'", in Iride. Filosofia e discussione pubblica, 41 (2004), pp. 220–226.
- "La 'posizione' esistenziale e il giudizio ipotetico nell'ontologia herbartiana: il caso degli oggetti inesistenti", in S. Poggi (a cura di), Natura umana e individualità psichica. Scienza, filosofia e religione in Italia e Germania tra Ottocento e Novecento, Milano, Unicopli, 2004, pp. 99–138. ISBN 978-88-400-0922-3
- "Sull'idea di una logica trascendentale", in Chora. Laboratorio di attualità, scrittura e cultura filosofica, n. 10, anno 4 (2005), pp. 18–20.
- "Alcune note sull'attualità dell'ontologia nella filosofia contemporanea più recente", in Paolo Valore (a cura di), Forma dat esse rei..., cit., pp. 7–11.
- "L'interpretazione semantica del trascendentale e l'ontologia del mondo reale in Giulio Preti", in Paolo Valore (a cura di), Forma dat esse rei..., cit., pp. 193–208.
- "Il mestiere antico e nuovo del filosofo", in la Repubblica, 28 febbraio 2004, p. XII (sezione Milano).
- "Lógica e Ontologia no confronto entre Bertrand Russell e Hugh MacColl acerca dos objectos inexistentes", in Revista Portuguesa de Filosofia, 63 (2007), pp. 415–429.
- "Fisica e geometria come modelli di lavoro per l'ontologia. Un'interpretazione del metodo delle relazioni”, in Paolo Valore (a cura di), Ars experientiam..., cit., pp. 157–169.
- "General and formal ontology", in Paolo Valore (a cura di), Topics on..., cit., pp. 11–13.
- "Some ontological remarks on The maxim of identification of indiscernibles", in Paolo Valore (a cura di), Topics on..., cit., pp. 67–76.
- Simona Chiodo e Paolo Valore, "Dall'epistolario di Giulio Preti ad Antonio Banfi", in Simona Chiodo e Gabriele Scaramuzza (a cura di), Ad Antonio Banfi cinquant'anni dopo, Milano, Unicopli, 2007, pp. 53–62. ISBN 978-88-400-1200-1.
- "Due tipi di parsimonia. Alcune considerazioni sul costruttivismo e il nominalismo ontologico", in Elio Franzini e Marcello La Matina (a cura di), Nelson Goodman, la filosofia e i linguaggi, Macerata, Quodlibet. 2008, pp. 157–168. ISBN 978-88-7462-179-8.
- "Cosa c'è che non va nell'idea di una lingua cosmica. Il caso del LINCOS di Freudenthal", in Multilingusimo e Società, 2010, pp. 67–76
- "Nothing is part of everything", in Giornale di filosofia, Ontologie/8 (2012): giornaledifilosofia.net
