= Giorgio Di Genova =

Italian art historian, critic and curator (1933–2023)

Giorgio Di Genova (23 October 1933 – 25 July 2023) was an Italian art historian, critic, and curator, mostly known for being the author of History of Italian Art of the Twentieth Century.

== Biography ==
Giorgio Di Genova was born in Rome on 23 October 1933. He graduated in History of Art at La Sapienza University of Rome with a dissertation on Silvestro Lega. He then became a member of the Italian Communist Party, only to leave after the Hungarian Revolution of 1956.

In 1975 he founded the quarterly magazine Third Eye, published by Bora in Bologna, which he edited until 2006. In 1984 he was the curator of the Italian Pavilion at the 41st edition of the Venice Biennale, where he invited Antonio Bueno, Mario Padovan, and Novello Finotti to exhibit. In 1993 he was one of the organizers of the 12th Rome Quadriennale.

In 1980 he was appointed Artistic Director of the National Biennial of Contemporary Art in the Province of Rieti. The first edition, Generation Twenties, was followed by two more, Generazione Anni Dieci (1982) and Generazione Primo Decennio (1985). Disagreements over the direction of the biennial led to Di Genova's resignation in 1986. In 1990 he started working on a revised and expanded edition of his book History of Italian Art of the Twentieth Century (1981).

In 1999 Di Genova was one of the founders of Museo MAGI '900 in Pieve di Cento near Bologna. Di Genova was also Artistic Director until his resignation in 2006. In 2008, he was appointed Artistic Director of the Lìmen International Art Prize by the Chamber of Commerce of Vibo Valentia.

== Works ==
- “Il Prometeo”. Scultura di Vittorio Amadio. Collezioni ed esposizioni temporanee ed itineranti - Sala Consiliare - Castel di Lama (Ascoli Piceno).La Sfinge.1997 Ascoli Piceno, Italy
- Enrico Accatino. La circolarità dello spirito. IGER, 1991, Roma, Italy
- Fiannacca. Storia e geografia delle belle arti e delle arti decorative. Artisti. Edizioni Bora, 1990, Bologna, Italy
- GAD. Gruppo Aniconismo Dialettico. W. Coccetta, A. Di Girolamo, Renzo Eusebi, G. Leto, La Sfinge, 1990, Ascoli Piceno, Italy
- Gruppo aniconismo dialettico, GAD. Con un omaggio a Pasquale Di Fabio, Edizioni De Luca, 1999, Roma, Italy
- Carlo Verdecchia, 1905 - 1984 Storia e geografia delle belle arti e delle arti decorative. Artisti - Palazzo Ducale - Atri (Teramo), Edizioni De Luca, 1998, Roma, Italy
- History of Italian Art of the Twentieth Century, Bologna, Bora, 1981, ISBN IT \ ICCU \ CFI \ 0039104
- Marzio Banfi: The Scenes of the Unconscious (2000-2003), Bologna, Bora, 2003, ISBN 88-88600-11-6
- Idioms of Contemporary Sculpture 2, Milan, Electa, 1989, ISBN 88-435-2917-X
