= List of municipalities of Marche =

The following is a list of the municipalities (comuni) in the region of Marche in Italy.

There are 225 municipalities in Marche as of 2026:

- 47 in the Province of Ancona
- 33 in the Province of Ascoli Piceno
- 40 in the Province of Fermo
- 55 in the Province of Macerata
- 50 in the Province of Pesaro and Urbino

== List ==
Municipality	Province	Population (2026)	Area (km²)	Density
Acqualagna	Pesaro and Urbino	4,153	50.69	81.9
Acquasanta Terme	Ascoli Piceno	2,411	138.39	17.4
Acquaviva Picena	Ascoli Piceno	3,586	21.06	170.3
Agugliano	Ancona	4,632	21.89	211.6
Altidona	Fermo	3,799	12.97	292.9
Amandola	Fermo	3,206	69.50	46.1
Ancona	Ancona	100,151	124.84	802.2
Apecchio	Pesaro and Urbino	1,663	103.11	16.1
Apiro	Macerata	2,015	53.78	37.5
Appignano	Macerata	4,119	22.67	181.7
Appignano del Tronto	Ascoli Piceno	1,641	23.19	70.8
Arcevia	Ancona	4,245	128.33	33.1
Arquata del Tronto	Ascoli Piceno	910	92.23	9.9
Ascoli Piceno	Ascoli Piceno	45,193	158.02	286.0
Barbara	Ancona	1,267	11.04	114.8
Belforte all'Isauro	Pesaro and Urbino	728	12.29	59.2
Belforte del Chienti	Macerata	1,829	16.05	114.0
Belmonte Piceno	Fermo	545	10.53	51.8
Belvedere Ostrense	Ancona	2,070	29.45	70.3
Bolognola	Macerata	148	25.87	5.7
Borgo Pace	Pesaro and Urbino	520	56.22	9.2
Cagli	Pesaro and Urbino	7,878	226.46	34.8
Caldarola	Macerata	1,621	29.22	55.5
Camerano	Ancona	6,997	20.00	349.9
Camerata Picena	Ancona	2,481	11.89	208.7
Camerino	Macerata	5,935	129.88	45.7
Campofilone	Fermo	1,930	12.21	158.1
Camporotondo di Fiastrone	Macerata	461	8.81	52.3
Cantiano	Pesaro and Urbino	1,962	83.25	23.6
Carassai	Ascoli Piceno	1,042	22.24	46.9
Carpegna	Pesaro and Urbino	1,674	28.94	57.8
Cartoceto	Pesaro and Urbino	7,955	23.20	342.9
Castel di Lama	Ascoli Piceno	8,412	10.98	766.1
Castelbellino	Ancona	4,905	6.05	810.7
Castelfidardo	Ancona	18,333	33.39	549.1
Castelleone di Suasa	Ancona	1,542	15.92	96.9
Castelplanio	Ancona	3,612	15.32	235.8
Castelraimondo	Macerata	4,180	44.85	93.2
Castelsantangelo sul Nera	Macerata	207	70.67	2.9
Castignano	Ascoli Piceno	2,511	38.80	64.7
Castorano	Ascoli Piceno	2,274	14.08	161.5
Cerreto d'Esi	Ancona	3,333	16.91	197.1
Cessapalombo	Macerata	409	27.58	14.8
Chiaravalle	Ancona	14,179	17.60	805.6
Cingoli	Macerata	9,438	148.20	63.7
Civitanova Marche	Macerata	41,929	46.07	910.1
Colli al Metauro	Pesaro and Urbino	12,349	46.17	267.5
Colli del Tronto	Ascoli Piceno	3,681	5.94	619.7
Colmurano	Macerata	1,121	11.20	100.1
Comunanza	Ascoli Piceno	2,919	54.40	53.7
Corinaldo	Ancona	4,729	49.28	96.0
Corridonia	Macerata	14,684	61.97	237.0
Cossignano	Ascoli Piceno	879	14.95	58.8
Cupra Marittima	Ascoli Piceno	5,343	17.34	308.1
Cupramontana	Ancona	4,321	27.40	157.7
Esanatoglia	Macerata	1,877	47.91	39.2
Fabriano	Ancona	28,469	272.08	104.6
Falconara Marittima	Ancona	26,022	25.82	1,007.8
Falerone	Fermo	3,148	24.61	127.9
Fano	Pesaro and Urbino	59,871	121.84	491.4
Fermignano	Pesaro and Urbino	8,268	43.70	189.2
Fermo	Fermo	35,853	124.53	287.9
Fiastra	Macerata	600	84.48	7.1
Filottrano	Ancona	8,849	71.20	124.3
Fiuminata	Macerata	1,194	76.22	15.7
Folignano	Ascoli Piceno	8,649	14.86	582.0
Force	Ascoli Piceno	1,080	34.31	31.5
Fossombrone	Pesaro and Urbino	9,028	106.88	84.5
Francavilla d'Ete	Fermo	914	10.20	89.6
Fratte Rosa	Pesaro and Urbino	827	15.63	52.9
Frontino	Pesaro and Urbino	290	10.37	28.0
Frontone	Pesaro and Urbino	1,192	36.08	33.0
Gabicce Mare	Pesaro and Urbino	5,411	4.94	1,095.3
Gagliole	Macerata	513	24.05	21.3
Genga	Ancona	1,612	73.16	22.0
Gradara	Pesaro and Urbino	4,899	17.53	279.5
Grottammare	Ascoli Piceno	15,913	18.00	884.1
Grottazzolina	Fermo	3,239	9.26	349.8
Gualdo	Macerata	700	22.22	31.5
Isola del Piano	Pesaro and Urbino	517	23.30	22.2
Jesi	Ancona	39,430	108.90	362.1
Lapedona	Fermo	1,144	14.93	76.6
Loreto	Ancona	13,083	17.90	730.9
Loro Piceno	Macerata	2,155	32.58	66.1
Lunano	Pesaro and Urbino	1,412	15.01	94.1
Macerata	Macerata	40,689	92.53	439.7
Macerata Feltria	Pesaro and Urbino	1,880	40.07	46.9
Magliano di Tenna	Fermo	1,405	7.93	177.2
Maiolati Spontini	Ancona	5,927	21.49	275.8
Maltignano	Ascoli Piceno	2,173	8.17	266.0
Massa Fermana	Fermo	819	7.73	106.0
Massignano	Ascoli Piceno	1,609	16.30	98.7
Matelica	Macerata	9,026	81.10	111.3
Mercatello sul Metauro	Pesaro and Urbino	1,320	68.36	19.3
Mercatino Conca	Pesaro and Urbino	1,078	13.95	77.3
Mergo	Ancona	970	7.28	133.2
Mogliano	Macerata	4,245	29.26	145.1
Mombaroccio	Pesaro and Urbino	2,156	28.21	76.4
Mondavio	Pesaro and Urbino	3,592	29.64	121.2
Mondolfo	Pesaro and Urbino	14,406	22.82	631.3
Monsampietro Morico	Fermo	582	9.76	59.6
Monsampolo del Tronto	Ascoli Piceno	4,379	15.43	283.8
Monsano	Ancona	3,184	14.66	217.2
Montalto delle Marche	Ascoli Piceno	1,814	33.94	53.4
Montappone	Fermo	1,537	10.41	147.6
Monte Cavallo	Macerata	100	38.51	2.6
Monte Cerignone	Pesaro and Urbino	568	18.24	31.1
Monte Giberto	Fermo	737	12.53	58.8
Monte Grimano Terme	Pesaro and Urbino	1,137	23.97	47.4
Monte Porzio	Pesaro and Urbino	2,852	18.29	155.9
Monte Rinaldo	Fermo	302	7.92	38.1
Monte Roberto	Ancona	2,992	13.57	220.5
Monte San Giusto	Macerata	7,411	20.04	369.8
Monte San Martino	Macerata	668	18.47	36.2
Monte San Pietrangeli	Fermo	2,147	18.45	116.4
Monte San Vito	Ancona	6,680	21.81	306.3
Monte Urano	Fermo	7,777	16.72	465.1
Monte Vidon Combatte	Fermo	394	11.17	35.3
Monte Vidon Corrado	Fermo	666	5.95	111.9
Montecalvo in Foglia	Pesaro and Urbino	2,779	18.25	152.3
Montecarotto	Ancona	1,849	24.39	75.8
Montecassiano	Macerata	6,694	33.36	200.7
Montecosaro	Macerata	7,370	21.88	336.8
Montedinove	Ascoli Piceno	443	11.93	37.1
Montefalcone Appennino	Fermo	363	15.99	22.7
Montefano	Macerata	3,304	33.94	97.3
Montefelcino	Pesaro and Urbino	2,427	39.01	62.2
Montefiore dell'Aso	Ascoli Piceno	1,946	28.21	69.0
Montefortino	Fermo	1,014	78.62	12.9
Montegallo	Ascoli Piceno	364	48.46	7.5
Montegiorgio	Fermo	6,236	47.45	131.4
Montegranaro	Fermo	12,482	31.42	397.3
Montelabbate	Pesaro and Urbino	7,066	19.57	361.1
Monteleone di Fermo	Fermo	351	8.21	42.8
Montelparo	Fermo	684	21.63	31.6
Montelupone	Macerata	3,380	32.67	103.5
Montemarciano	Ancona	9,827	22.31	440.5
Montemonaco	Ascoli Piceno	518	67.81	7.6
Monteprandone	Ascoli Piceno	13,111	26.38	497.0
Monterubbiano	Fermo	1,964	32.24	60.9
Montottone	Fermo	890	16.38	54.3
Moresco	Fermo	510	6.35	80.3
Morro d'Alba	Ancona	1,800	19.46	92.5
Morrovalle	Macerata	9,773	42.58	229.5
Muccia	Macerata	786	25.91	30.3
Numana	Ancona	3,737	10.94	341.6
Offagna	Ancona	2,117	10.63	199.2
Offida	Ascoli Piceno	4,569	49.60	92.1
Ortezzano	Fermo	730	7.08	103.1
Osimo	Ancona	34,780	106.74	325.8
Ostra	Ancona	6,216	47.25	131.6
Ostra Vetere	Ancona	3,042	30.02	101.3
Palmiano	Ascoli Piceno	150	12.70	11.8
Pedaso	Fermo	2,819	3.85	732.2
Peglio	Pesaro and Urbino	690	21.36	32.3
Penna San Giovanni	Macerata	901	28.08	32.1
Pergola	Pesaro and Urbino	5,745	112.40	51.1
Pesaro	Pesaro and Urbino	95,270	152.81	623.5
Petriano	Pesaro and Urbino	2,814	11.27	249.7
Petriolo	Macerata	1,821	15.65	116.4
Petritoli	Fermo	2,086	24.00	86.9
Piandimeleto	Pesaro and Urbino	2,052	39.90	51.4
Pietrarubbia	Pesaro and Urbino	652	13.29	49.1
Pieve Torina	Macerata	1,204	74.80	16.1
Piobbico	Pesaro and Urbino	1,808	48.20	37.5
Pioraco	Macerata	915	19.45	47.0
Poggio San Marcello	Ancona	683	13.36	51.1
Poggio San Vicino	Macerata	195	13.03	15.0
Pollenza	Macerata	6,149	39.55	155.5
Polverigi	Ancona	4,539	24.98	181.7
Ponzano di Fermo	Fermo	1,589	14.27	111.4
Porto Recanati	Macerata	12,734	17.25	738.2
Porto San Giorgio	Fermo	15,488	8.79	1,762.0
Porto Sant'Elpidio	Fermo	25,735	18.13	1,419.5
Potenza Picena	Macerata	15,470	48.55	318.6
Rapagnano	Fermo	1,908	12.65	150.8
Recanati	Macerata	20,558	103.46	198.7
Ripatransone	Ascoli Piceno	4,105	74.28	55.3
Ripe San Ginesio	Macerata	797	10.17	78.4
Roccafluvione	Ascoli Piceno	1,816	60.63	30.0
Rosora	Ancona	1,788	9.41	190.0
Rotella	Ascoli Piceno	764	27.44	27.8
San Benedetto del Tronto	Ascoli Piceno	46,976	25.41	1,848.7
San Costanzo	Pesaro and Urbino	4,648	40.89	113.7
San Ginesio	Macerata	3,047	78.02	39.1
San Lorenzo in Campo	Pesaro and Urbino	3,157	28.80	109.6
San Marcello	Ancona	2,006	25.78	77.8
San Paolo di Jesi	Ancona	909	10.11	89.9
San Severino Marche	Macerata	11,793	194.26	60.7
Sant'Angelo in Pontano	Macerata	1,219	27.38	44.5
Sant'Angelo in Vado	Pesaro and Urbino	3,905	67.34	58.0
Sant'Elpidio a Mare	Fermo	16,325	50.52	323.1
Sant'Ippolito	Pesaro and Urbino	1,506	19.88	75.8
Santa Maria Nuova	Ancona	3,880	18.29	212.1
Santa Vittoria in Matenano	Fermo	1,109	26.18	42.4
Sarnano	Macerata	3,058	63.17	48.4
Sassocorvaro Auditore	Pesaro and Urbino	4,875	87.55	55.7
Sassoferrato	Ancona	6,797	137.23	49.5
Sefro	Macerata	425	42.54	10.0
Senigallia	Ancona	43,808	117.77	372.0
Serra de' Conti	Ancona	3,515	24.54	143.2
Serra San Quirico	Ancona	2,469	49.33	50.1
Serra Sant'Abbondio	Pesaro and Urbino	846	32.80	25.8
Serrapetrona	Macerata	848	37.65	22.5
Serravalle di Chienti	Macerata	1,035	95.99	10.8
Servigliano	Fermo	2,205	18.49	119.3
Sirolo	Ancona	4,090	16.68	245.2
Smerillo	Fermo	330	11.29	29.2
Spinetoli	Ascoli Piceno	7,159	12.58	569.1
Staffolo	Ancona	2,149	27.50	78.1
Tavoleto	Pesaro and Urbino	831	12.41	67.0
Tavullia	Pesaro and Urbino	8,018	42.07	190.6
Terre Roveresche	Pesaro and Urbino	5,182	70.37	73.6
Tolentino	Macerata	17,439	95.12	183.3
Torre San Patrizio	Fermo	1,810	11.93	151.7
Trecastelli	Ancona	7,597	39.30	193.3
Treia	Macerata	9,002	93.54	96.2
Urbania	Pesaro and Urbino	6,888	77.53	88.8
Urbino	Pesaro and Urbino	13,868	226.50	61.2
Urbisaglia	Macerata	2,363	22.86	103.4
Ussita	Macerata	332	55.30	6.0
Valfornace	Macerata	883	48.62	18.2
Vallefoglia	Pesaro and Urbino	14,943	39.57	377.6
Venarotta	Ascoli Piceno	1,862	30.21	61.6
Visso	Macerata	920	100.40	9.2

== See also ==
- List of municipalities of Italy
