= List of municipalities of the Province of Fermo =

The following is a list of the 40 municipalities (comuni) of the Province of Fermo in the region of Marche in Italy.

== List ==
Municipality	Population (2026)	Area (km²)	Density
Altidona	3,799	12.97	292.9
Amandola	3,206	69.50	46.1
Belmonte Piceno	545	10.53	51.8
Campofilone	1,930	12.21	158.1
Falerone	3,148	24.61	127.9
Fermo	35,853	124.53	287.9
Francavilla d'Ete	914	10.20	89.6
Grottazzolina	3,239	9.26	349.8
Lapedona	1,144	14.93	76.6
Magliano di Tenna	1,405	7.93	177.2
Massa Fermana	819	7.73	106.0
Monsampietro Morico	582	9.76	59.6
Montappone	1,537	10.41	147.6
Monte Giberto	737	12.53	58.8
Monte Rinaldo	302	7.92	38.1
Monte San Pietrangeli	2,147	18.45	116.4
Monte Urano	7,777	16.72	465.1
Monte Vidon Combatte	394	11.17	35.3
Monte Vidon Corrado	666	5.95	111.9
Montefalcone Appennino	363	15.99	22.7
Montefortino	1,014	78.62	12.9
Montegiorgio	6,236	47.45	131.4
Montegranaro	12,482	31.42	397.3
Monteleone di Fermo	351	8.21	42.8
Montelparo	684	21.63	31.6
Monterubbiano	1,964	32.24	60.9
Montottone	890	16.38	54.3
Moresco	510	6.35	80.3
Ortezzano	730	7.08	103.1
Pedaso	2,819	3.85	732.2
Petritoli	2,086	24.00	86.9
Ponzano di Fermo	1,589	14.27	111.4
Porto San Giorgio	15,488	8.79	1,762.0
Porto Sant'Elpidio	25,735	18.13	1,419.5
Rapagnano	1,908	12.65	150.8
Sant'Elpidio a Mare	16,325	50.52	323.1
Santa Vittoria in Matenano	1,109	26.18	42.4
Servigliano	2,205	18.49	119.3
Smerillo	330	11.29	29.2
Torre San Patrizio	1,810	11.93	151.7

== See also ==
- List of municipalities of Marche
- List of municipalities of Italy
