= Tenna (river) =

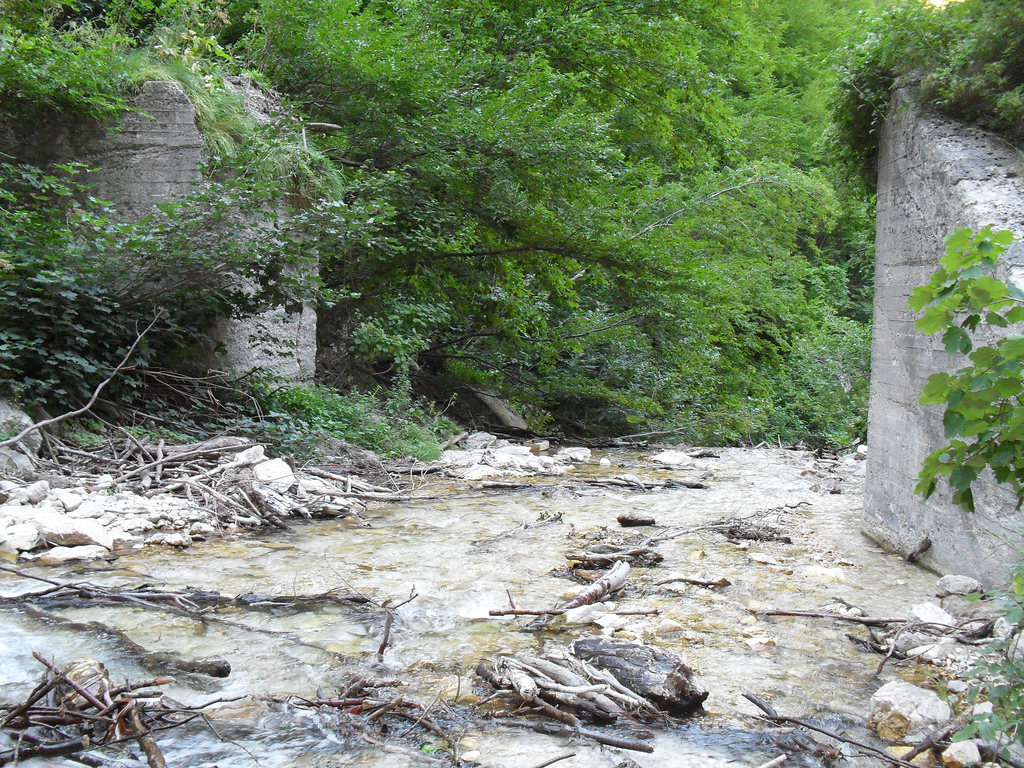
- Tenna

Location
- Country: Italy

Physical characteristics
- Source
  - location: Sibillini Mountains
  - elevation: 1,178 m (3,865 ft)
- Mouth: Adriatic Sea
  - location: Porto Sant'Elpidio
  - coordinates: 43.2343°N 13.7779°E
- Length: 70 km (43 mi)
- Discharge
  - average: 7 m^{3}/s (250 cu ft/s)

The Tenna is a river in the Marche region of Italy. Its source is in the Sibillini Mountains in the province of Fermo near the border with the province of Macerata. It flows northeast through the mountains near Montefortino and Amandola before forming the border between the provinces of Fermo and Macerata. The river enters the province of Fermo near Servigliano and continues flowing northeast past Grottazzolina and Montegiorgio. Finally, the river enters the Adriatic Sea near Sant'Elpidio a Mare and Porto Sant'Elpidio.
