= Várpalota =

- Town
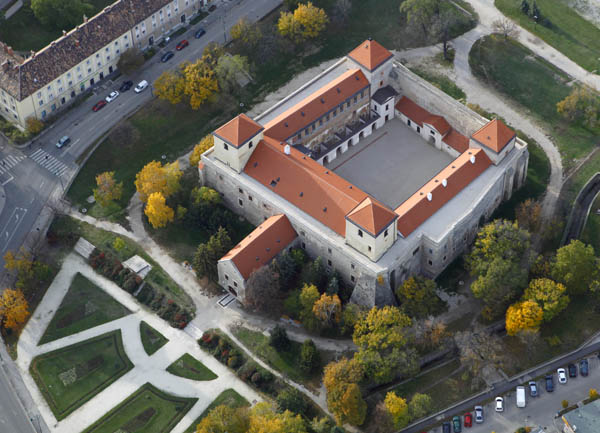
- Thury Castle

- Flag Coat of arms

- Location of Várpalota
- Coordinates: 47.19888°N 18.13761°E
- Country: Hungary
- County: Veszprém

Area
  - Total: 77.26 km^{2} (29.83 sq mi)

Population (2004)
  - Total: 21,371
  - Density: 243.98/km^{2} (631.9/sq mi)
- Time zone: UTC+1 (CET)
  - Summer (DST): UTC+2 (CEST)
- Postal code: 8100
- Area code: 88
- Website: http://www.varpalota.hu

Várpalota (Hungarian pronunciation: [ˈvaːrpɒlotɒ]; German: Burgschloß) is a town in Western Hungary, in the Transdanubian county of Veszprém. It was a mining town during the Socialist era, but the mines have been closed. Most of the citizens work in the nearby cities, Veszprém or Székesfehérvár.

== History ==
The town's origins are linked to the Roman and Avar periods, as testified verified by burial mounds, tombstones and Roman artifacts in the outskirts of the town, some of which can be found in the lapidary of Thury Castle.

In the Middle Ages it was a flourishing market town. It was successfully besieged by the Ottoman Empire in October 1593 during the Long Turkish War. In the 20th century it became a center for coal mining.

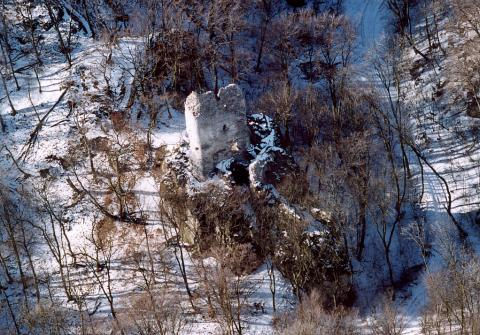
Bátorkő in winter.

== Main sights ==
- The Thury castle, located in the heart of the town. It was commanded, among the others, by György Thury. It is currently home to the Museum of Chemistry, and the collection of the memories of coal mining. Concerts and theatre performances are held there every summer.
- The old Catholic church, home to Romanesque and early-Gothic frescos in a particularly good condition. One of the World War I memorials erected in those days and destroyed in the tempests of the history can be found here.
- Jó Szerencsét (Good Luck) Community Centre, which houses four large-sized Gobelin works of Noémi Ferenczy. The one-man exhibition of Frigyes Matzon, one of the significant representatives of constructivism can be visited in the nearby Nagy Gyula Gallery, which was converted from a synagogue.
- Baroque Reformed church with its irregularly arched western façade. It was built on the walls of the formerly Hussar Castle. It houses the memorial plaque of Mária Molnár.
- Zichy Castle. The library-room with its wooden cover and its frescos recalling mythological ages, is a regular place of cultural events. It also includes the Zichy-Chapel and the altar carved from sandstone in the Catholic cemetery. Among the graves are the memorial of militiaman martyrs of the Hungarian Revolution and War of Independence belonging to the earl's family.
- Memorials of the Hungarian Revolution and War of Independence in 1848–49, of the World War heroes and victims, of the heroes of Revolution in 1956.

== Twin towns – sister cities ==
Várpalota is twinned with:

- Bad Nauheim, Germany
- Borgo San Lorenzo, Italy
- Collesalvetti, Italy
- Fermo, Italy
- Grottazzolina, Italy
- Kremnica, Slovakia
- Laukuva, Lithuania
- Montegiorgio, Italy
- Petroșani, Romania
- Rychnov nad Kněžnou, Czech Republic
- Sant'Elpidio a Mare, Italy
- Slovenj Gradec, Slovenia
- Wolfsberg, Austria

Várpalota also maintains friendly relations with:

- Casper, Wyoming, United States
- Cupramontana, Italy
- Hanušovice, Czech Republic
- Ilok, Croatia
- Jesi, Italy
- Osimo, Italy
- Pașcani, Romania
- Prelog, Croatia
- Viesīte, Latvia

== Sport ==
Várpalotai Bányász SK - Association football club
