= Magliano di Tenna =

- Comune
- Comune di Magliano di Tenna
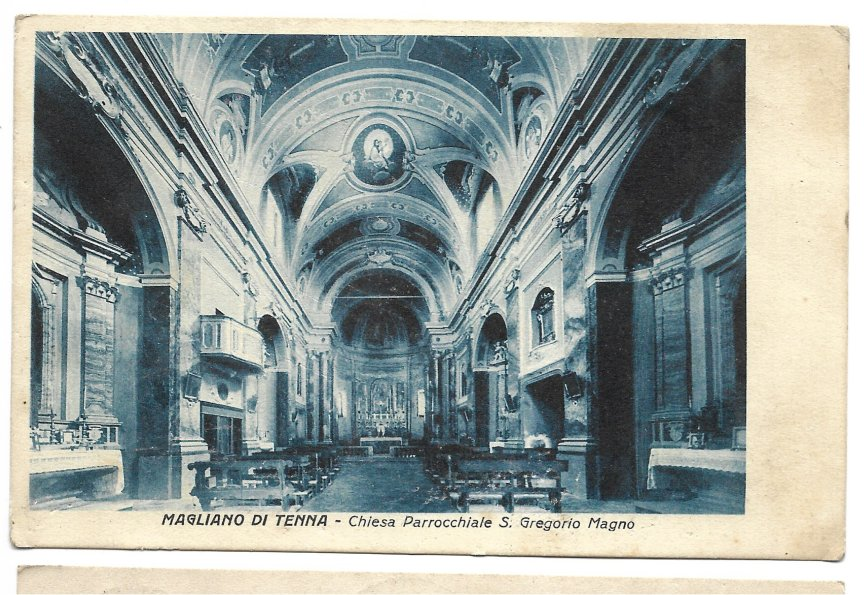
- Parish Church of San Gregorio Magno (Magliano di Tenna 1928)

- Location within Italy Location within Marche
- Coordinates: 43°8′N 13°35′E
- Country: Italy
- Region: Marche
- Province: Province of Fermo

Government
  - Mayor: Nello De Angelis

Area
  - Total: 7.8 km^{2} (3.0 sq mi)

Population (Dec. 2004)
  - Total: 1,312
  - Density: 170/km^{2} (440/sq mi)
- Time zone: UTC+1 (CET)
  - Summer (DST): UTC+2 (CEST)
- Postal code: 63020
- Dialing code: 0734

Magliano di Tenna is a comune (municipality) in the Province of Fermo in the Italian region Marche, located about 50 kilometres (31 mi) south of Ancona and about 30 kilometres (19 mi) north of Ascoli Piceno. As of 31 December 2004, it had a population of 1,312 and an area of 7.8 square kilometres (3.0 mi^{2}).

Magliano di Tenna borders the following municipalities: Fermo, Grottazzolina, Montegiorgio, Rapagnano.

== Demographic evolution ==
Historical population

Year	Pop.	±%
1861	1,078	—
1871	1,071	−0.6%
1881	1,091	+1.9%
1901	1,298	+19.0%
1911	1,323	+1.9%

Year	Pop.	±%
1921	1,407	+6.3%
1931	1,425	+1.3%
1936	1,396	−2.0%
1951	1,350	−3.3%
1961	1,298	−3.9%

Year	Pop.	±%
1971	1,191	−8.2%
1981	1,080	−9.3%
1991	1,069	−1.0%
2001	1,204	+12.6%

Source: Data from ISTAT
