= Montefalcone Appennino =

- Comune
- Comune di Montefalcone Appennino
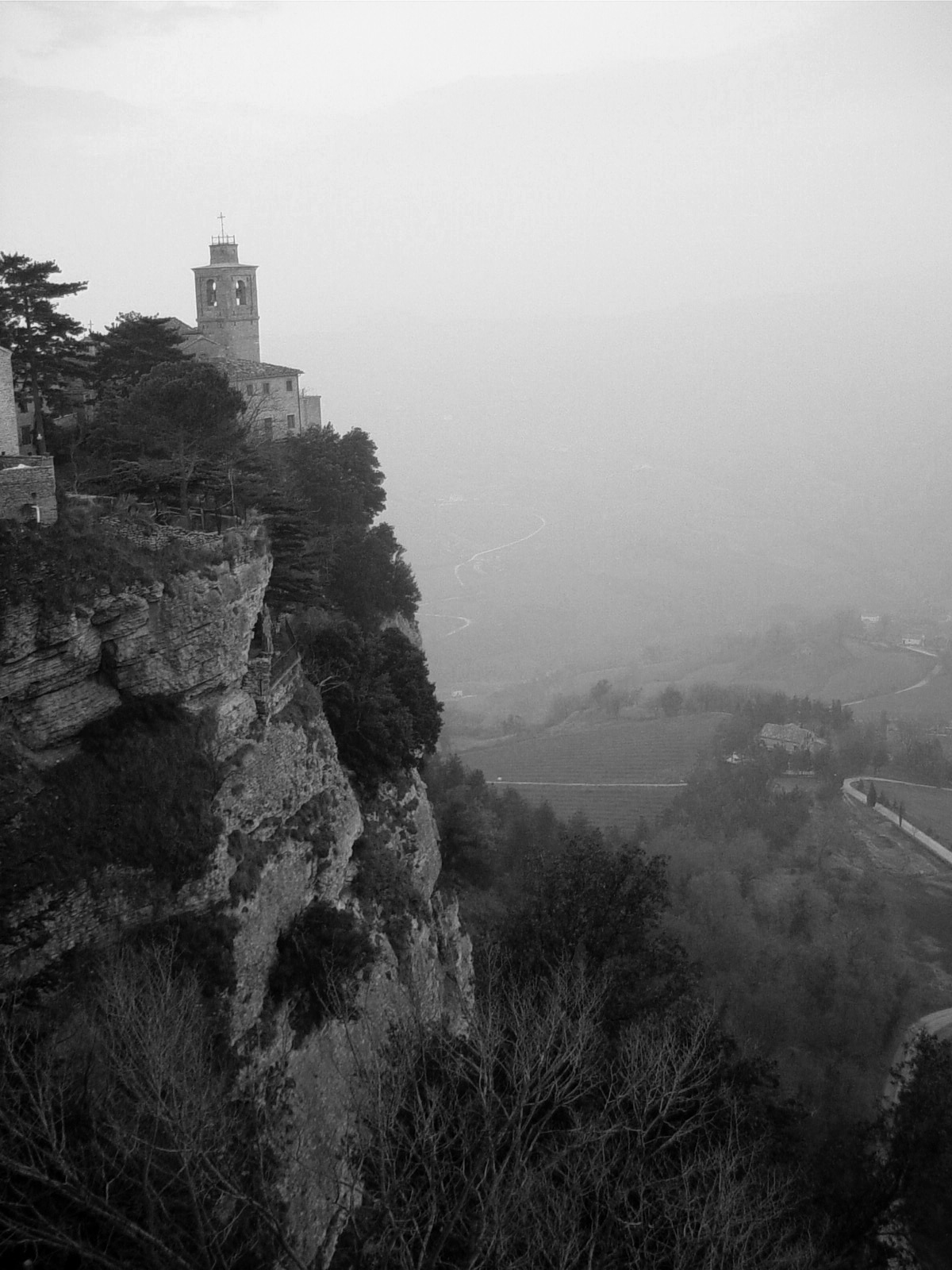

- Coat of arms

- Location within Italy Location within Marche
- Coordinates: 42°59′N 13°27′E
- Country: Italy
- Region: Marche
- Province: Fermo

Government
  - Mayor: Adamo Rossi

Area
  - Total: 16.0 km^{2} (6.2 sq mi)
- Elevation: 757 m (2,484 ft)

Population (30 November 2017)
  - Total: 414
  - Density: 25.9/km^{2} (67.0/sq mi)
- Demonym: Montefalconesi
- Time zone: UTC+1 (CET)
  - Summer (DST): UTC+2 (CEST)
- Postal code: 63020
- Dialing code: 0734
- Patron saint: St. Michael Archangel
- Saint day: 8 May
- Website: Official website

Montefalcone Appennino is a comune (municipality) in the Province of Fermo in the Italian region Marche, located about 85 kilometres (53 mi) south of Ancona, about 30 kilometres (19 mi) northwest of Ascoli Piceno and about 35 kilometres (22 mi) east of Fermo. It occupies a spur between the rivers Aso and Tenna.

== Monuments and places of interest ==
=== Church of Saint Michael Archangel ===
This is the parish church of the village. It is mentioned for the first time as Saint Angel of the Castle in a document dating back to 1332. In 1572 it was included in the diocese of Fermo: The present construction was built in 1821–1824 by the Commune of Montefalcone who paid 3000 Roman scudi which had been donated by Livio Palmoni, a coachman of Pope Pio VII. It is located in the same place where formerly the church of the Saint Peter in door lain. It is Greek cross-shaped and it was built in Romanesque style. In the interior are three altars. Above the high one, a painting representing Saint Michael Archangel by Giuseppe Toscani (1947) is located. The other altars are dedicated to the Holy Heart, bearing a painting showing Saint Eurosia which has been attributed to Antonio Liozzi from Penna San Giovanni (eighteenth century) and to the Our Lady of Sorrows. The church has endured several restoration works; the first one took place between 1899 and 1902 by order of the parish priest Don Donato Mariucci. Don Raffaele Gasparri ordered the work in 1925 and in 1949–1950 when Toscani frescoed the vault and the walls. About the 1970s, the parish priest Don Tarcisio Molini made the present Salone Don Bosco out of two locals which served as sacristies.

Other sights include the tower of the former castle, the church of St. Peter (14th century) and the church of Santa Maria delle Scalelle (Santa Maria in Capite Scalorum, 14th century).

== See also ==
- Monti Sibillini
- Monti della Laga
