= Aso (river) =

River in Marche, Italy

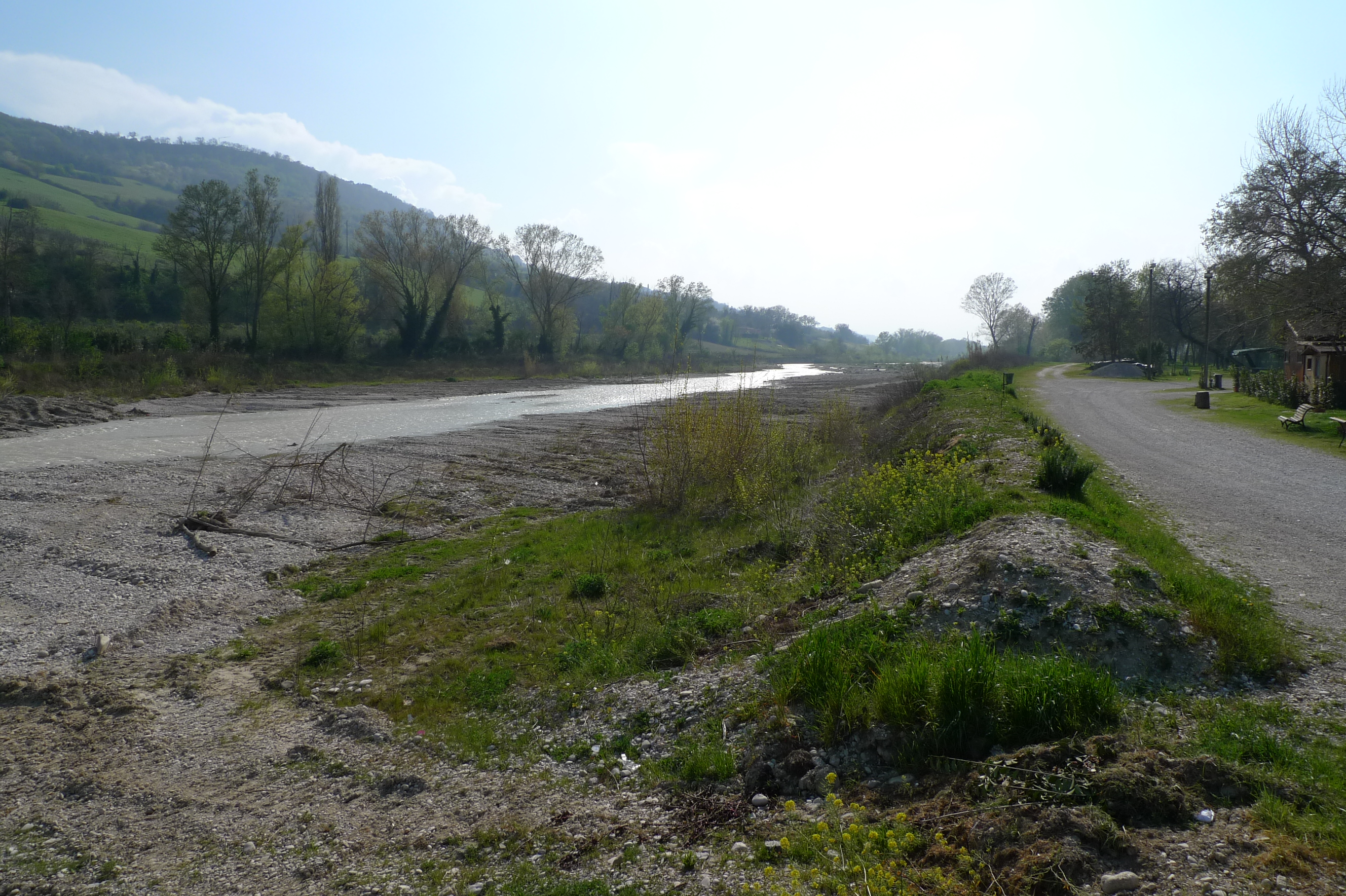

Location
- Country: Italy

Physical characteristics
- Source
  - location: Monti Sibillini, near Foce
  - elevation: 950 m (3,120 ft)
- Mouth: Adriatic Sea
  - location: Pedaso
  - coordinates: 43.1030°N 13.8422°E
  - elevation: 0 m (0 ft)
- Length: 63 km (39 mi)
- Basin size: 242 km^{2} (93 sq mi)
- Discharge
  - average: 2.6 m^{3}/s (92 cu ft/s)

The Aso (Latin: Helvinus) is a 63-kilometre (39 mi) river in the Marche region of Italy. For most of its course the river marks the boundary between the provinces of Ascoli Piceno and Fermo

The river's source is in the Monti Sibillini, near Foce in the Comune of Montemonaco, at an elevation of 950 metres (3,120 ft). The Aso flows through the settlements of Tofe, San Giorgio all’Isola, Illice, Piane, Comunanza, Montecchio, Madonna del Lago, Aso and Rubbianello before entering the Adriatic Sea at Pedaso, where it delivers a mean discharge of 2.6 cubic metres per second (92 cu ft/s).

== See also ==
- Latin names of rivers
