= Belmonte Piceno =

- Comune
- Comune di Belmonte Piceno
- Location within Italy Location within Marche
- Coordinates: 43°6′N 13°32′E
- Country: Italy
- Region: Marche
- Province: Province of Fermo
- Frazioni: Castellarso Ete, Castellarso Tenna, Colle Ete, Colle Tenna

Government
  - Mayor: Ivano Bascioni

Area
  - Total: 10.53 km^{2} (4.07 sq mi)
- Elevation: 312 m (1,024 ft)

Population (30 April 2017)
  - Total: 626
  - Density: 59.4/km^{2} (154/sq mi)
- Demonym: Belmontesi
- Time zone: UTC+1 (CET)
  - Summer (DST): UTC+2 (CEST)
- Postal code: 63020
- Dialing code: 0734
- Website: Official website

Belmonte Piceno is a comune (municipality) in the Province of Fermo in the Italian region Marche, located about 60 kilometres (37 mi) south of Ancona and about 30 kilometres (19 mi) north of Ascoli Piceno.

Belmonte Piceno borders the following municipalities: Falerone, Fermo, Grottazzolina, Monsampietro Morico, Montegiorgio, Monteleone di Fermo, Montottone, Servigliano.

In Belmonte Piceno, an important burial ground from the Iron Age was found. One of the most important finds was an ivory casket discovered in 2018, which contains amber figures depicting Greek myths.
