= Montappone =

- Comune
- Comune di Montappone
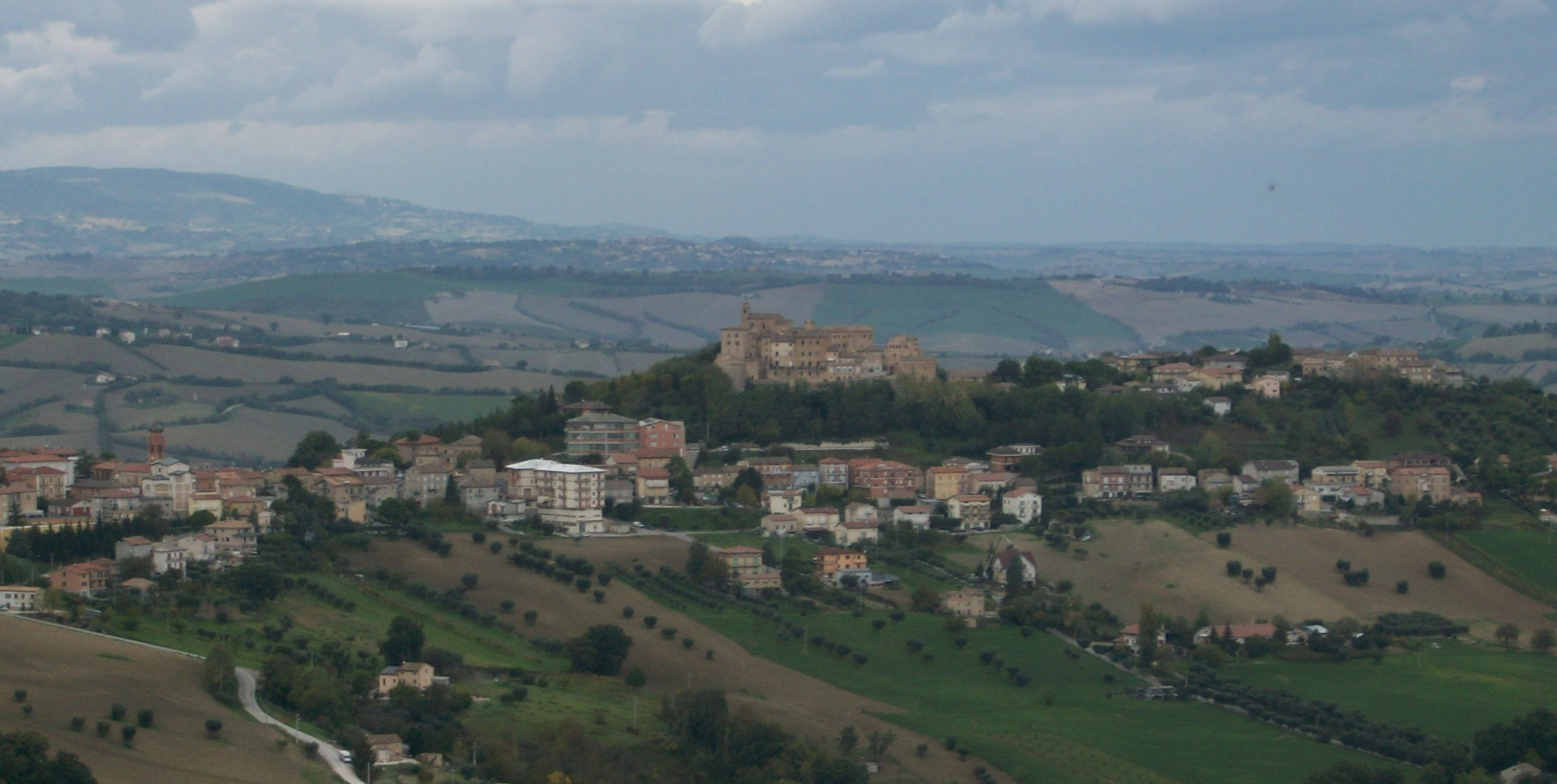
- Montappone

- Location within Italy Location within Marche
- Coordinates: 43°8′N 13°28′E
- Country: Italy
- Region: Marche
- Province: Province of Fermo

Area
  - Total: 10.4 km^{2} (4.0 sq mi)

Population (Dec. 2004)
  - Total: 1,780
  - Density: 171/km^{2} (443/sq mi)
- Time zone: UTC+1 (CET)
  - Summer (DST): UTC+2 (CEST)
- Postal code: 63020
- Dialing code: 0734

Montappone is a comune (municipality) in the Province of Fermo in the Italian region Marche, located about 50 kilometres (31 mi) south of Ancona and about 35 kilometres (22 mi) northwest of Ascoli Piceno. It is a very important centre for hat production. As of 31 December 2004, it had a population of 1,780 and an area of 10.4 square kilometres (4.0 mi^{2}).

Montappone borders the following municipalities: Falerone, Loro Piceno, Massa Fermana, Monte Vidon Corrado, Montegiorgio, Sant'Angelo in Pontano.

== Demographic evolution ==
Historical population

Year	Pop.	±%
1861	1,895	—
1871	2,111	+11.4%
1881	2,335	+10.6%
1901	2,427	+3.9%
1911	2,539	+4.6%

Year	Pop.	±%
1921	2,092	−17.6%
1931	2,021	−3.4%
1936	2,099	+3.9%
1951	1,980	−5.7%
1961	1,819	−8.1%

Year	Pop.	±%
1971	1,849	+1.6%
1981	1,776	−3.9%
1991	1,801	+1.4%
2001	1,787	−0.8%

Source: Data from ISTAT
