= Montefortino =

- Comune
- Comune di Montefortino
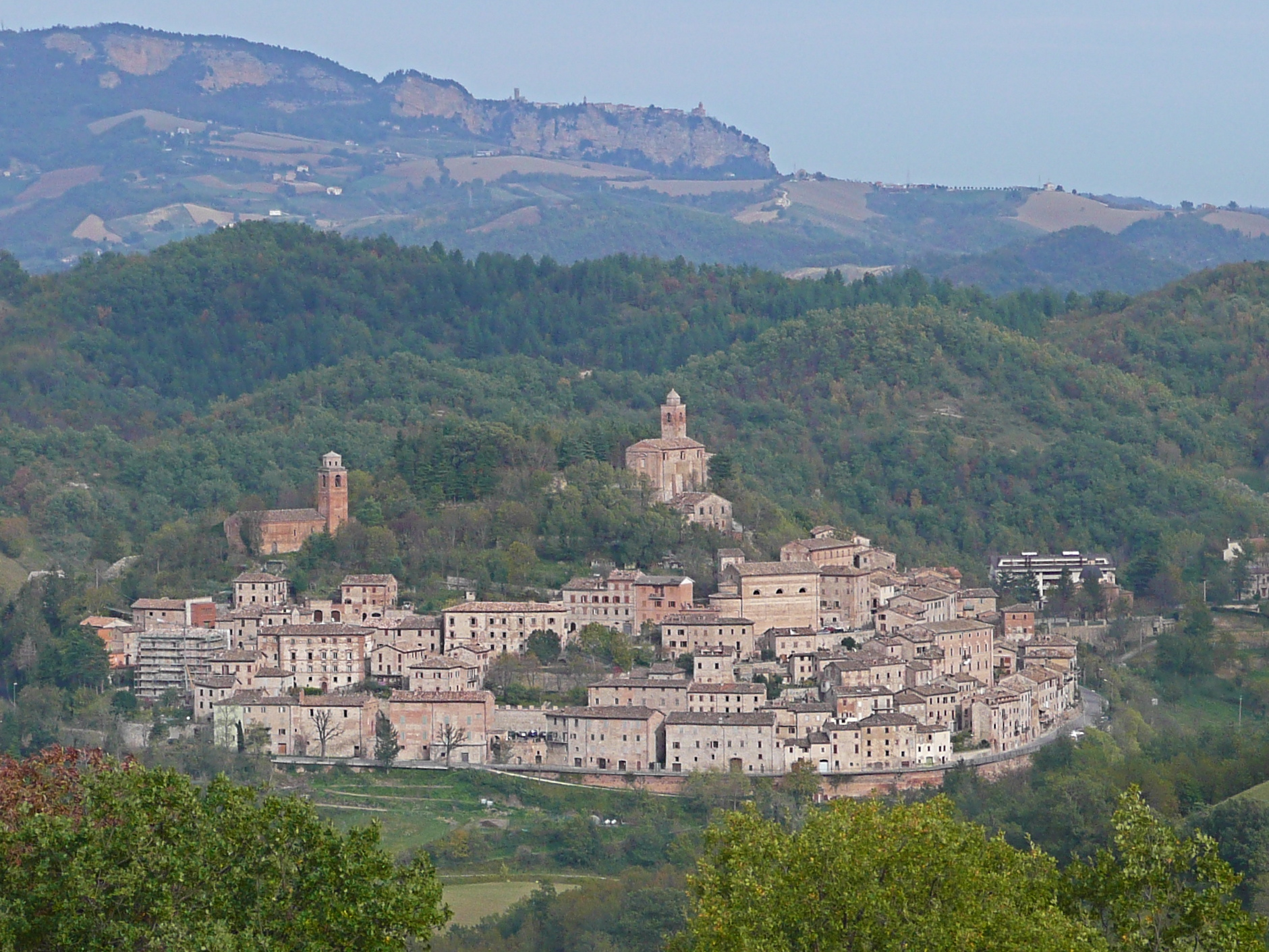

- Location within Italy Location within Marche
- Coordinates: 42°57′N 13°21′E
- Country: Italy
- Region: Marche
- Province: Fermo

Government
  - Mayor: Domenico Ciaffaroni

Area
  - Total: 78.62 km^{2} (30.36 sq mi)
- Elevation: 638 m (2,093 ft)

Population (30 April 2024)
  - Total: 1,032
  - Density: 13.13/km^{2} (34.00/sq mi)
- Demonym: Montefortinesi or Fortinesi
- Time zone: UTC+1 (CET)
  - Summer (DST): UTC+2 (CEST)
- Postal code: 63047
- Dialing code: 0736
- Website: Official website

Montefortino is a comune (municipality) in the Province of Fermo in the Italian region Marche, located about 80 kilometres (50 mi) south of Ancona, about 35 kilometres (22 mi) northwest of Ascoli Piceno and about 45 kilometres (28 mi) west of Fermo.

Montefortino borders the following municipalities: Amandola, Bolognola, Castelsantangelo sul Nera, Comunanza, Montemonaco, Sarnano, Ussita, Visso.

The city art collection is housed in the Pinacoteca Civica Fortunato Duranti.
