= Lapedona =

- Comune
- Comune di Lapedona
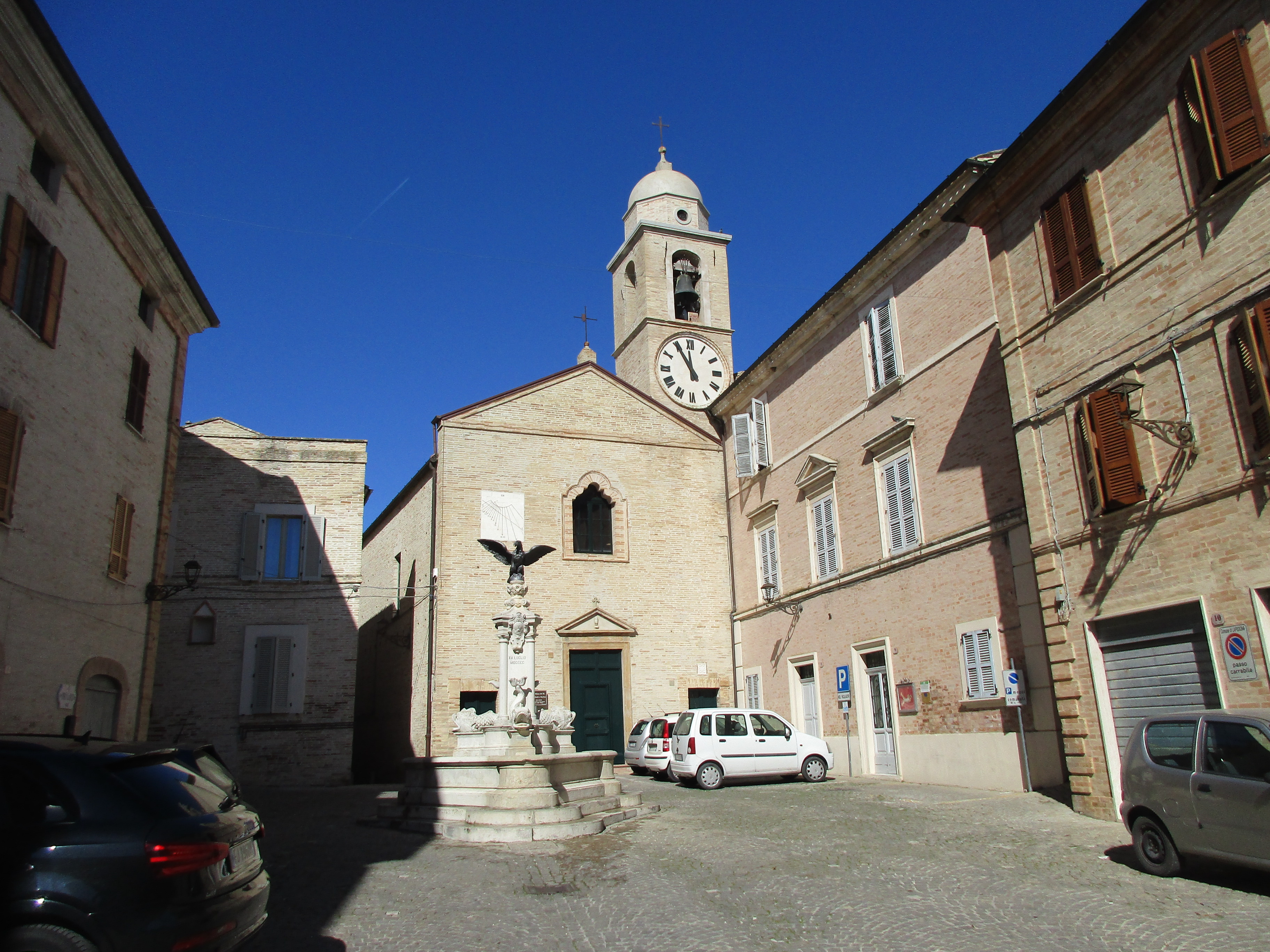
- Church of Saints Nicholas and Martin

- Location within Italy Location within Marche
- Coordinates: 43°7′N 13°46′E
- Country: Italy
- Region: Marche
- Province: Province of Fermo

Government
  - Mayor: Giuseppe Taffetani

Area
  - Total: 14.8 km^{2} (5.7 sq mi)
- Elevation: 264 m (866 ft)

Population (Dec. 2004)
  - Total: 1,157
  - Density: 78.2/km^{2} (202/sq mi)
- Demonym: Lapedonesi
- Time zone: UTC+1 (CET)
  - Summer (DST): UTC+2 (CEST)
- Postal code: 63010
- Dialing code: 0734 936321
- Website: Official website

Lapedona is a comune (municipality) in the Province of Fermo in the Italian region Marche, located about 60 kilometres (37 mi) southeast of Ancona and about 35 kilometres (22 mi) northeast of Ascoli Piceno. As of 31 December 2004, it had a population of 1,157 and an area of 14.8 square kilometres (5.7 mi^{2}).

Lapedona borders the following municipalities: Altidona, Campofilone, Fermo, Montefiore dell'Aso, Monterubbiano, Moresco.

== Demographic evolution ==
Historical population

Year	Pop.	±%
1861	1,375	—
1871	1,383	+0.6%
1881	1,374	−0.7%
1901	1,556	+13.2%
1911	1,684	+8.2%

Year	Pop.	±%
1921	1,641	−2.6%
1931	1,763	+7.4%
1936	1,856	+5.3%
1951	1,942	+4.6%
1961	1,672	−13.9%

Year	Pop.	±%
1971	1,306	−21.9%
1981	1,143	−12.5%
1991	1,168	+2.2%
2001	1,148	−1.7%

Source: Data from ISTAT

== People related to Lapedona ==
- Savino Marè (1964- ), actor, writer and photographer.
