= Montegiorgio =

- Comune
- Comune di Montegiorgio
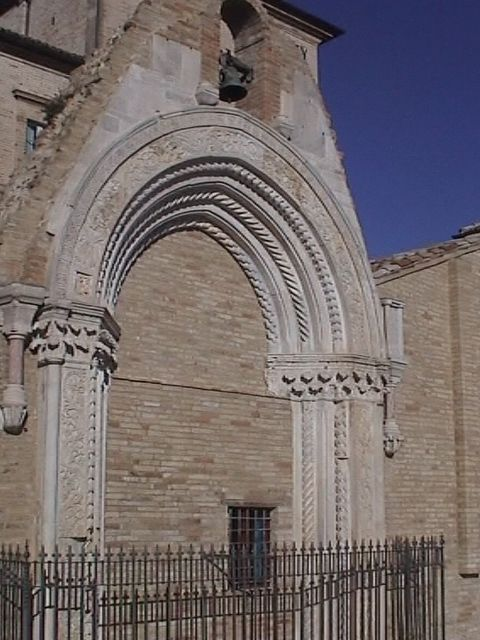
- Portal of the church of San Salvatore

- Location within Italy Location within Marche
- Coordinates: 43°8′N 13°32′E
- Country: Italy
- Region: Marche
- Province: Fermo (FM)

Government
  - Mayor: Michele Ortenzi

Area
  - Total: 47.45 km^{2} (18.32 sq mi)
- Elevation: 411 m (1,348 ft)

Population (30 November 2017)
  - Total: 6,715
  - Density: 141.5/km^{2} (366.5/sq mi)
- Demonym: Montegiorgesi
- Time zone: UTC+1 (CET)
  - Summer (DST): UTC+2 (CEST)
- Postal code: 63833
- Dialing code: 0734
- Website: Official website

Montegiorgio is a comune (municipality) in the Province of Fermo in the Italian region Marche, located about 80 kilometres (50 mi) south of Ancona and about 70 kilometres (43 mi) north of Ascoli Piceno.

Montegiorgio borders the following municipalities: Belmonte Piceno, Falerone, Fermo, Francavilla d'Ete, Magliano di Tenna, Massa Fermana, Montappone, Monte San Pietrangeli, Monte Vidon Corrado, Rapagnano.

== Main sights ==
- Remains of the portal of church of San Salvatore (late 14th century)
- Castle walls (13th-14th centuries)
- Church of San Francesco (13th century, restored in the 16th century)
- Castles of Cerreto and Alteta

== People ==
- Domenico Alaleona (1881–1900), composer
