= Montottone =

- Comune
- Comune di Montottone
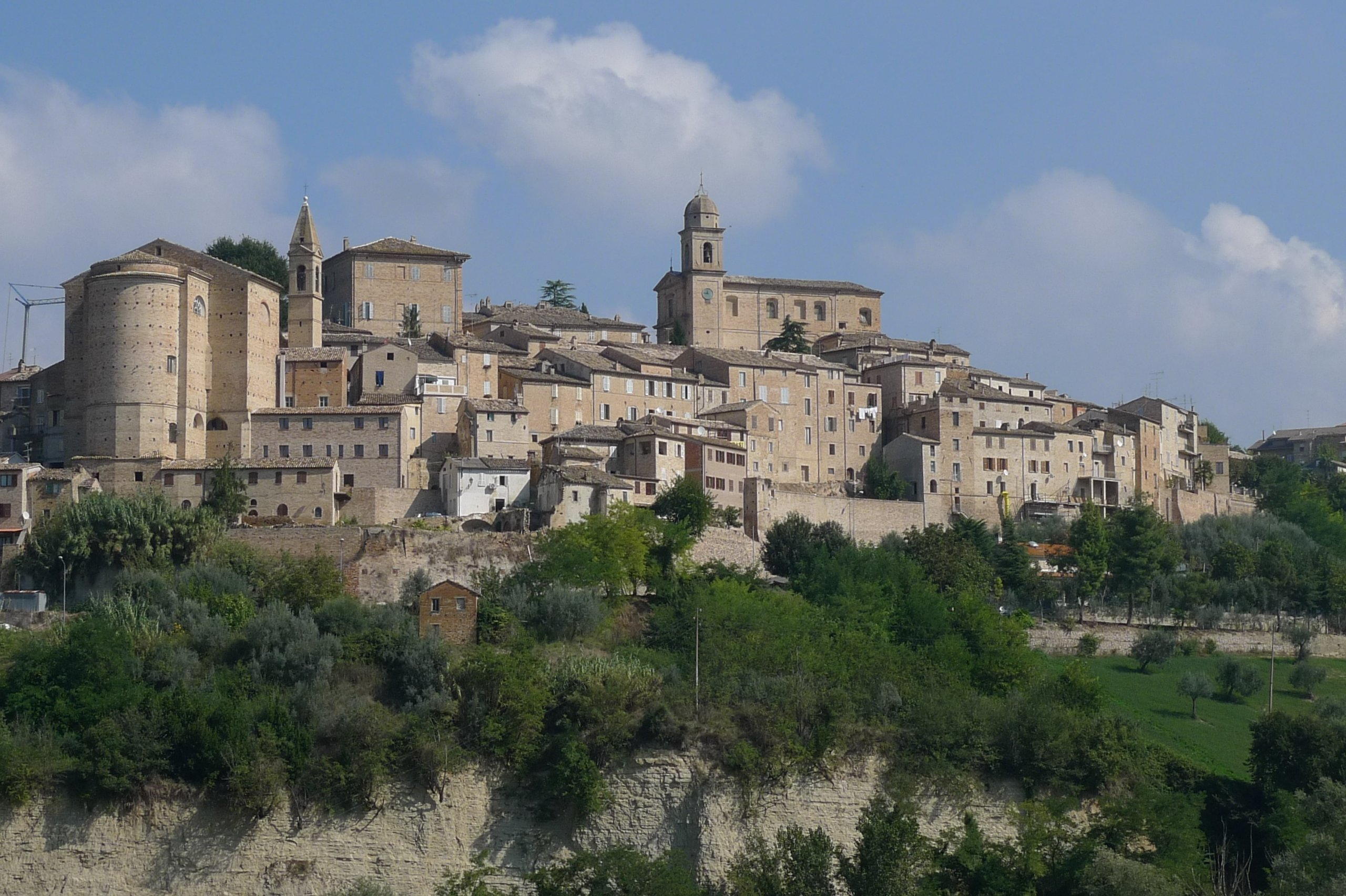

- Coat of arms

- Location within Italy Location within Marche
- Coordinates: 43°03′43″N 13°35′24″E
- Country: Italy
- Region: Marche
- Province: Fermo (FM)

Government
  - Mayor: Francesca Claretti

Area
  - Total: 16.4 km^{2} (6.3 sq mi)
- Elevation: 277 m (909 ft)

Population (31 October 2009)
  - Total: 1,021
  - Density: 62.3/km^{2} (161/sq mi)
- Demonym: Montottonesi
- Time zone: UTC+1 (CET)
  - Summer (DST): UTC+2 (CEST)
- Postal code: 63020
- Dialing code: 0734
- Website: Official website

Montottone is a comune (municipality) in the Province of Fermo in the Italian region Marche, located about 60 kilometres (37 mi) south of Ancona and about 25 kilometres (16 mi) north of Ascoli Piceno.

Montottone borders the following municipalities: Belmonte Piceno, Grottazzolina, Monsampietro Morico, Monte Giberto, Monte Rinaldo, Monte Vidon Combatte, Ortezzano.
