= Campofilone =

- Comune
- Comune di Campofilone
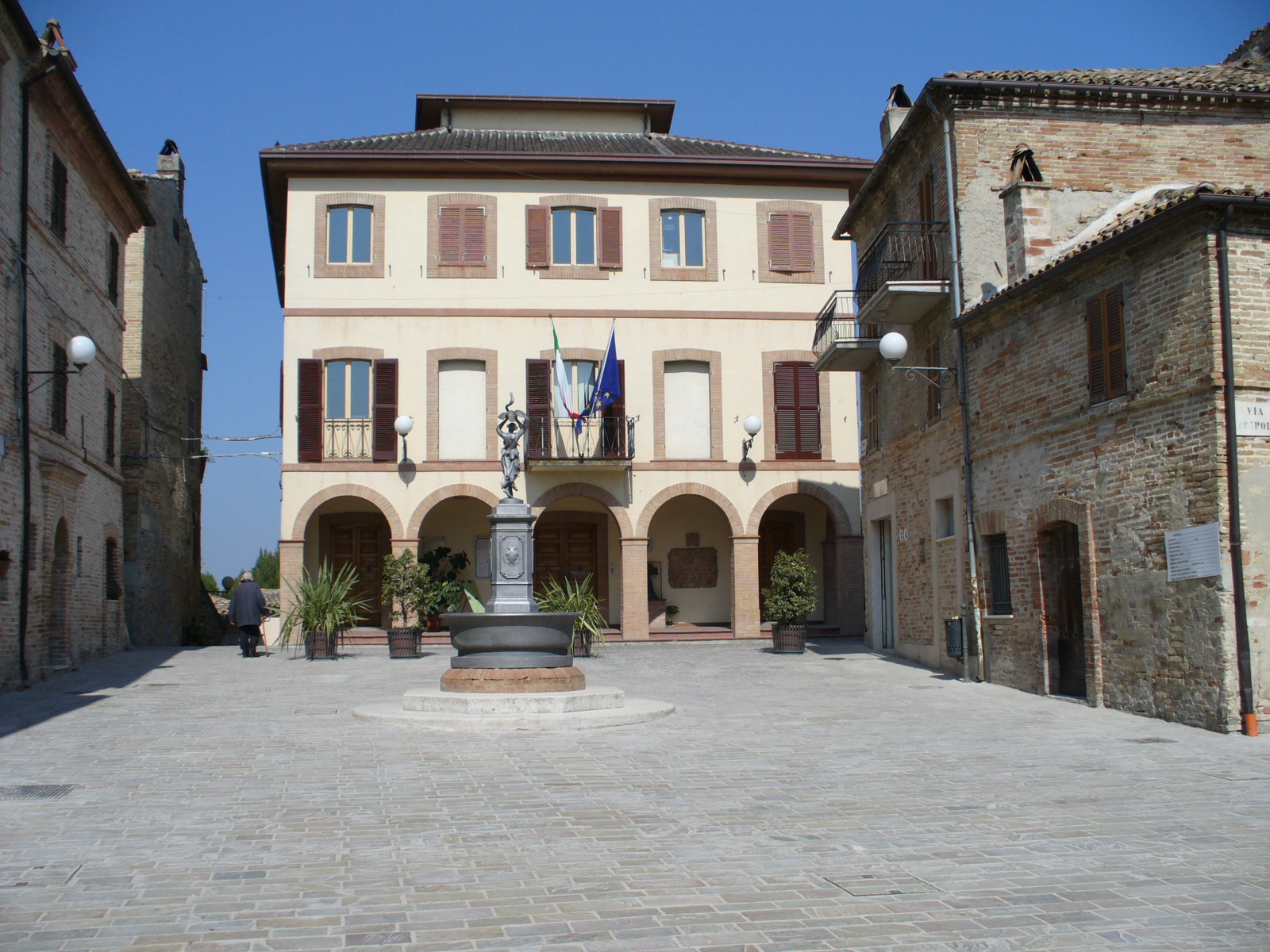
- City Hall

- Location within Italy Location within Marche
- Coordinates: 43°5′N 13°49′E
- Country: Italy
- Region: Marche
- Province: Province of Fermo (FM)

Government
  - Mayor: Ercole D'Ercoli

Area
  - Total: 12.1 km^{2} (4.7 sq mi)
- Elevation: 210 m (690 ft)

Population (Dec. 2006)
  - Total: 1,885
  - Density: 156/km^{2} (403/sq mi)
- Demonym: Campofilonesi
- Time zone: UTC+1 (CET)
  - Summer (DST): UTC+2 (CEST)
- Postal code: 63016
- Dialing code: 0734

Campofilone is a comune (municipality) in the Province of Fermo in the Italian region Marche, located about 60 kilometres (37 mi) southeast of Ancona and about 30 kilometres (19 mi) northeast of Ascoli Piceno. As of 31 December 2018, it had a population of 1,912 and an area of 12.1 square kilometres (4.7 mi^{2}).

Campofilone borders the following municipalities: Altidona, Lapedona, Massignano, Montefiore dell'Aso, Pedaso.

== Geography ==
Campofilone is located near the Adriatic Sea on a hill that reaches its highest point—202 meters above sea level—at the abbey’s garden. In 1907, the abbey vicar Don Angelo Maria Astorri described the surrounding landscape as follows:

“Among the many blessings generously bestowed by nature upon our beautiful Italy, one cannot fail to notice that stretch of Adriatic coast which, from the mouth of the Tronto River, stretches in a varied and picturesque fashion toward the port of Civitanova. Amid the many delightful landscapes that unfold along this admirable stretch, after the ancient town of Cupra, on a sunny hill rising almost sheer from the sea above the industrious little village named after the Aso River, which flows into the sea there, one sees an enchanting village, encircled by its ancient crenellated walls, distinguished from others by its large church and tall tower. This is Campofilone.”

== Demographic evolution ==
Historical population

Year	Pop.	±%
1861	1,389	—
1871	1,548	+11.4%
1881	1,549	+0.1%
1901	1,792	+15.7%
1911	1,931	+7.8%

Year	Pop.	±%
1921	2,008	+4.0%
1931	1,929	−3.9%
1936	1,994	+3.4%
1951	2,152	+7.9%
1961	1,857	−13.7%

Year	Pop.	±%
1971	1,650	−11.1%
1981	1,618	−1.9%
1991	1,678	+3.7%
2001	1,803	+7.4%
2008	1,896	+5.2%

Source: Data from ISTAT
