= Massignano =

- Comune
- Comune di Massignano
- Location within Italy Location within Marche
- Coordinates: 43°3′N 13°48′E
- Country: Italy
- Region: Marche
- Province: Province of Ascoli Piceno (AP)

Area
  - Total: 16.3 km^{2} (6.3 sq mi)

Population (Dec. 2004)
  - Total: 1,621
  - Density: 99.4/km^{2} (258/sq mi)
- Demonym: Massignanesi
- Time zone: UTC+1 (CET)
  - Summer (DST): UTC+2 (CEST)
- Postal code: 63061
- Dialing code: 0735

Massignano is a comune (municipality) in the Province of Ascoli Piceno in the Italian region Marche, located about 70 kilometres (43 mi) southeast of Ancona and about 30 kilometres (19 mi) northeast of Ascoli Piceno. As of 31 December 2004, it had a population of 1,621 and an area of 16.3 square kilometres (6.3 mi^{2}).

Massignano borders the following municipalities: Campofilone, Cupra Marittima, Montefiore dell'Aso, Ripatransone.

== Demographic evolution ==
Historical population

| Year | Pop. | ±% |
|---|---|---|
| 1861 | 1,850 | — |
| 1871 | 1,858 | +0.4% |
| 1881 | 1,907 | +2.6% |
| 1901 | 2,058 | +7.9% |
| 1911 | 2,084 | +1.3% |

| Year | Pop. | ±% |
|---|---|---|
| 1921 | 2,137 | +2.5% |
| 1931 | 2,346 | +9.8% |
| 1936 | 2,411 | +2.8% |
| 1951 | 2,554 | +5.9% |
| 1961 | 2,292 | −10.3% |

| Year | Pop. | ±% |
|---|---|---|
| 1971 | 1,896 | −17.3% |
| 1981 | 1,619 | −14.6% |
| 1991 | 1,571 | −3.0% |
| 2001 | 1,589 | +1.1% |

Source: Data from ISTAT
