= Monte Giberto =

- Comune
- Comune di Monte Giberto
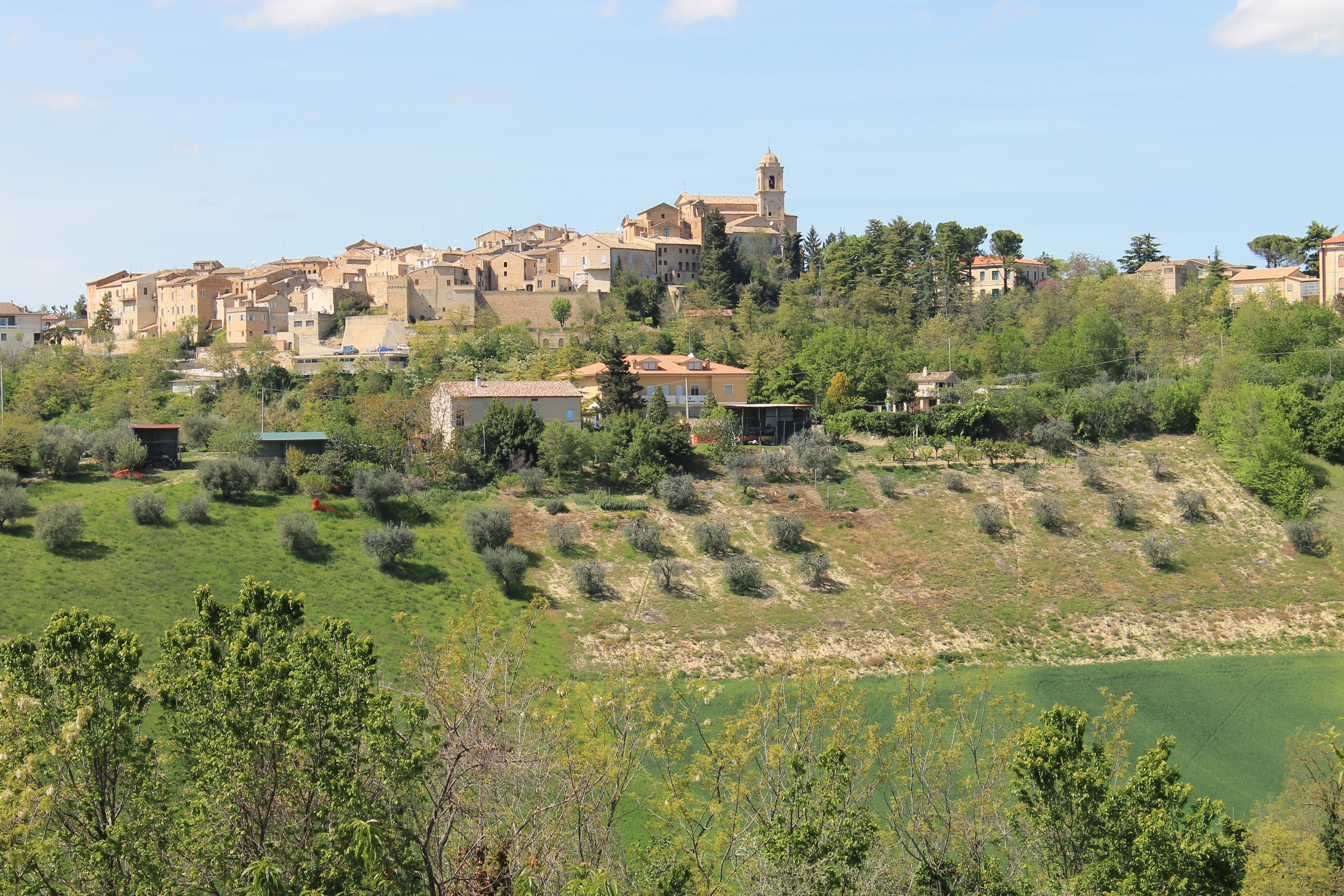

- Location within Italy Location within Marche
- Coordinates: 43°6′N 13°38′E
- Country: Italy
- Region: Marche
- Province: Province of Fermo

Area
  - Total: 12.7 km^{2} (4.9 sq mi)
- Elevation: 323 m (1,060 ft)

Population (Dec. 2004)
  - Total: 865
  - Density: 68.1/km^{2} (176/sq mi)
- Demonym: Montegibertesi
- Time zone: UTC+1 (CET)
  - Summer (DST): UTC+2 (CEST)
- Postal code: 63020
- Dialing code: 0734
- Website: Official website

Monte Giberto is a comune (municipality) in the Province of Fermo in the Italian region Marche, located about 60 kilometres (37 mi) south of Ancona and about 30 kilometres (19 mi) north of Ascoli Piceno. As of 31 December 2004, it had a population of 865 and an area of 12.7 square kilometres (4.9 mi^{2}).

Monte Giberto borders the following municipalities: Grottazzolina, Monte Vidon Combatte, Montottone, Petritoli, Ponzano di Fermo.

== Demographic evolution ==
Historical population

Year	Pop.	±%
1861	1,376	—
1871	1,404	+2.0%
1881	1,345	−4.2%
1901	1,540	+14.5%
1911	1,617	+5.0%

Year	Pop.	±%
1921	1,679	+3.8%
1931	1,846	+9.9%
1936	1,917	+3.8%
1951	1,825	−4.8%
1961	1,539	−15.7%

Year	Pop.	±%
1971	1,068	−30.6%
1981	858	−19.7%
1991	813	−5.2%
2001	863	+6.2%

Source: Data from ISTAT
