= Ponzano di Fermo =

- Comune
- Comune di Ponzano di Fermo
- Location within Italy Location within Marche
- Coordinates: 43°6′N 13°40′E
- Country: Italy
- Region: Marche
- Province: Province of Fermo (Fermo)
- Frazioni: Torchiaro e Capparuccia

Area
  - Total: 14.4 km^{2} (5.6 sq mi)
- Elevation: 248 m (814 ft)

Population (Dec. 2004)
  - Total: 1,623
  - Density: 113/km^{2} (292/sq mi)
- Demonym: Ponzanesi
- Time zone: UTC+1 (CET)
  - Summer (DST): UTC+2 (CEST)
- Postal code: 63020
- Dialing code: 0734

Ponzano di Fermo is a comune (municipality) in the Province of Fermo in the Italian region Marche, located about 60 kilometres (37 mi) south of Ancona and about 30 kilometres (19 mi) north of Ascoli Piceno. As of 31 December 2004, it had a population of 1,623 and an area of 14.4 square kilometres (5.6 mi^{2}).

The municipality of Ponzano di Fermo contains the frazione (subdivision) Torchiaro e Capparuccia.

Ponzano di Fermo borders the following municipalities: Fermo, Grottazzolina, Monte Giberto, Monterubbiano, Petritoli.

== Demographic evolution ==
Historical population

Year	Pop.	±%
1861	1,424	—
1871	1,486	+4.4%
1881	1,551	+4.4%
1901	1,787	+15.2%
1911	1,825	+2.1%

Year	Pop.	±%
1921	1,861	+2.0%
1931	2,002	+7.6%
1936	2,081	+3.9%
1951	2,050	−1.5%
1961	1,712	−16.5%

Year	Pop.	±%
1971	1,154	−32.6%
1981	1,103	−4.4%
1991	1,372	+24.4%
2001	1,581	+15.2%

Source: Data from ISTAT
