= Francavilla d'Ete =

- Comune
- Comune di Francavilla d'Ete
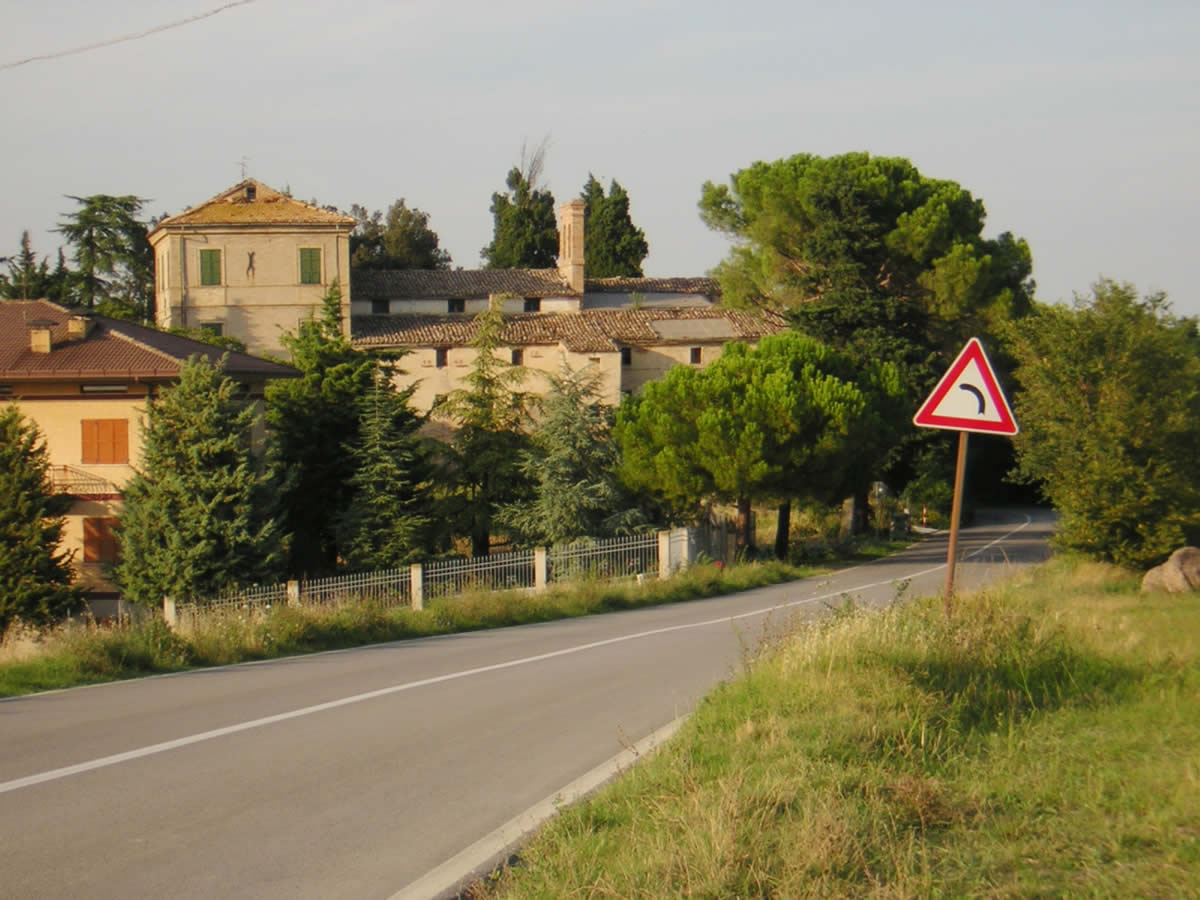

- Location within Italy Location within Marche
- Coordinates: 43°11′N 13°32′E
- Country: Italy
- Region: Marche
- Province: Fermo

Government
  - Mayor: Nicolino Carolini

Area
  - Total: 10.2 km^{2} (3.9 sq mi)
- Elevation: 224 m (735 ft)

Population (31 March 2017)
  - Total: 953
  - Density: 93.4/km^{2} (242/sq mi)
- Demonym: Francavillesi
- Time zone: UTC+1 (CET)
  - Summer (DST): UTC+2 (CEST)
- Postal code: 63020
- Dialing code: 0734
- Website: Official website

Francavilla d'Ete is a comune (municipality) in the Province of Fermo in the Italian region Marche, located about 50 kilometres (31 mi) south of Ancona and about 35 kilometres (22 mi) north of Ascoli Piceno.

Francavilla d'Ete borders the following municipalities: Corridonia, Fermo, Mogliano, Monte San Pietrangeli, Montegiorgio.
