= Pedaso =

- Comune
- Comune di Pedaso
- Location within Italy Location within Marche
- Coordinates: 43°6′N 13°51′E
- Country: Italy
- Region: Marche
- Province: Province of Fermo (FM)

Area
  - Total: 3.6 km^{2} (1.4 sq mi)
- Elevation: 5 m (16 ft)

Population (Dec. 2018)
  - Total: 2,854
  - Density: 790/km^{2} (2,100/sq mi)
- Time zone: UTC+1 (CET)
  - Summer (DST): UTC+2 (CEST)
- Postal code: 63827
- Dialing code: 0734
- Website: Official website

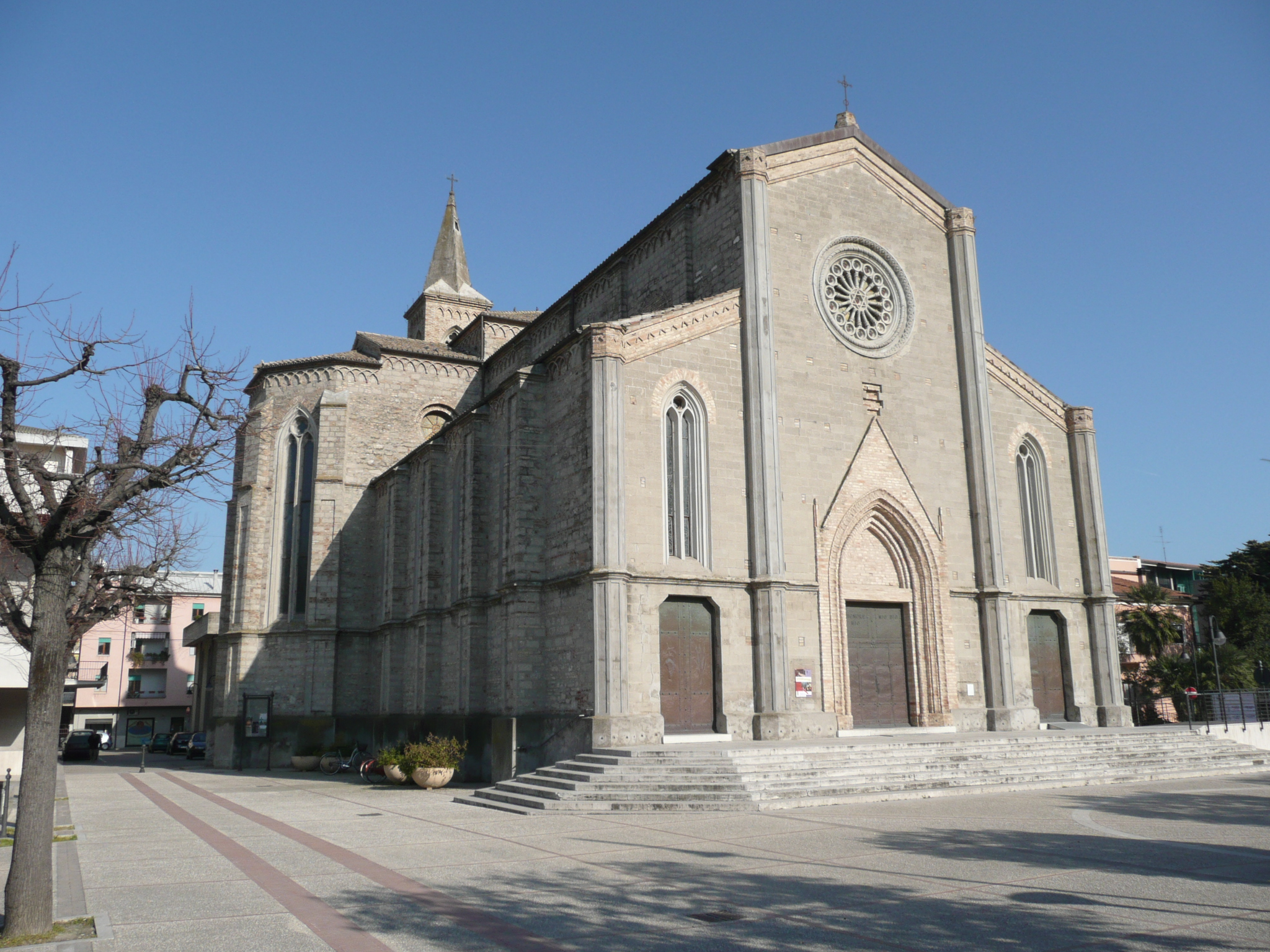
Piazza Roma in Pedaso

Pedaso is a comune (municipality) in the Province of Fermo in the Italian region Marche, located about 60 kilometres (37 mi) southeast of Ancona and about 35 kilometres (22 mi) northeast of Ascoli Piceno. As of 31 December 2018, it had a population of 2,854 and an area of 3.85 square kilometres (1.49 mi^{2}). Pedaso borders the following municipalities: Altidona, Campofilone.

== Demographic evolution From 1861 to 2001 ==
Historical population

Year	Pop.	±%
1861	572	—
1871	672	+17.5%
1881	755	+12.4%
1901	920	+21.9%
1911	1,026	+11.5%

Year	Pop.	±%
1921	1,063	+3.6%
1931	1,145	+7.7%
1936	1,251	+9.3%
1951	1,428	+14.1%
1961	1,612	+12.9%

Year	Pop.	±%
1971	1,774	+10.0%
1981	1,859	+4.8%
1991	1,934	+4.0%
2001	1,968	+1.8%

Source: Data from ISTAT
