= Smerillo =

- Comune
- Comune di Smerillo
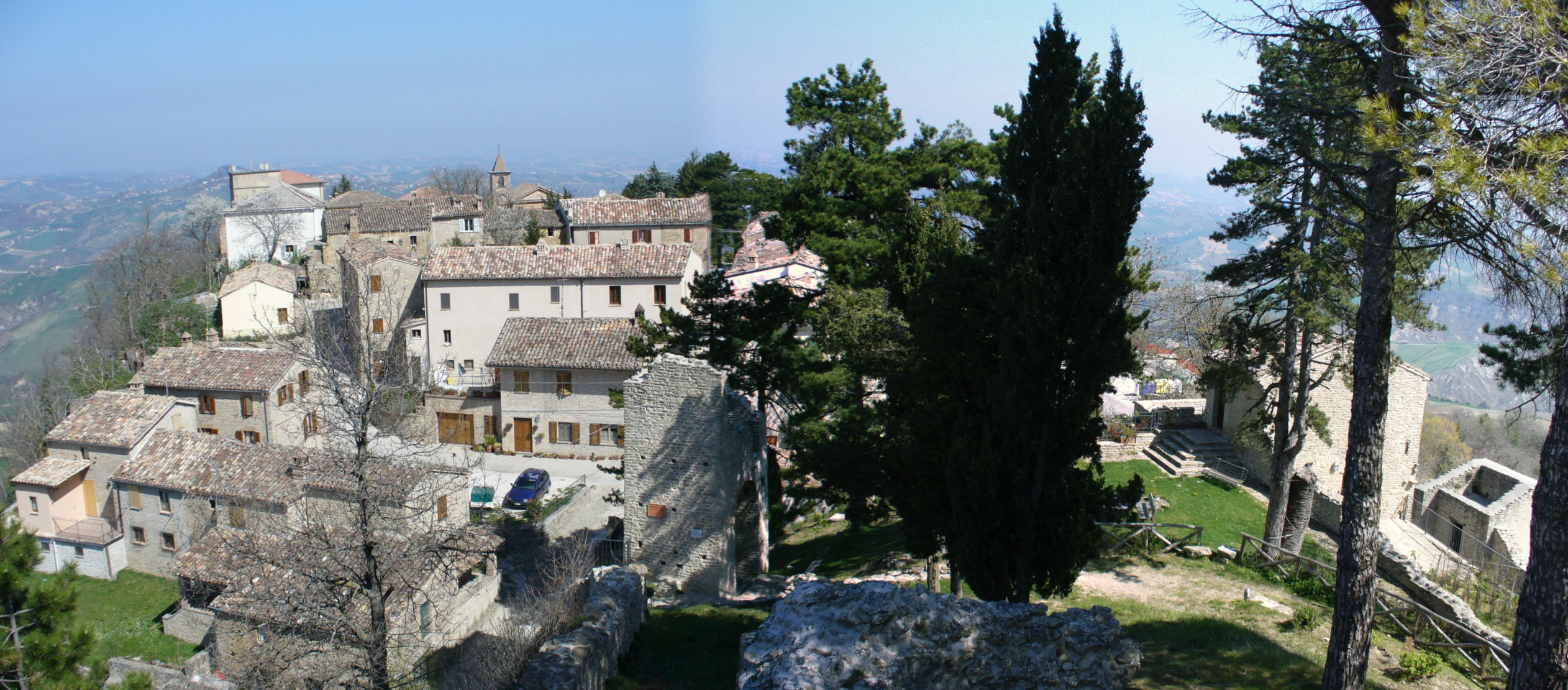

- Location within Italy Location within Marche
- Coordinates: 43°0′N 13°27′E
- Country: Italy
- Region: Marche
- Province: Fermo (FM)
- Frazioni: Castorano, Cersola, San Martino al Faggio

Government
  - Mayor: Egidio Ricci

Area
  - Total: 11.3 km^{2} (4.4 sq mi)
- Elevation: 806 m (2,644 ft)

Population (31 December 2008)
  - Total: 414
  - Density: 36.6/km^{2} (94.9/sq mi)
- Demonym: Smerillesi
- Time zone: UTC+1 (CET)
  - Summer (DST): UTC+2 (CEST)
- Postal code: 63020
- Dialing code: 0734
- Patron saint: Sts. Peter and Paul
- Saint day: June 29
- Website: Official website

Smerillo is a comune (municipality) in the Province of Fermo in the Italian region Marche, located about 80 kilometres (50 mi) south of Ancona, about 35 kilometres (22 mi) northwest of Ascoli Piceno and about 35 kilometres (22 mi) west of Fermo, on a spur midway from the Monti Sibillini and the Adriatic Sea.

It houses several remains of the medieval castle and walls. Also notable are the churches of Santa Caterina and San Ruffino.
