= Ortezzano =

- Comune
- Comune di Ortezzano
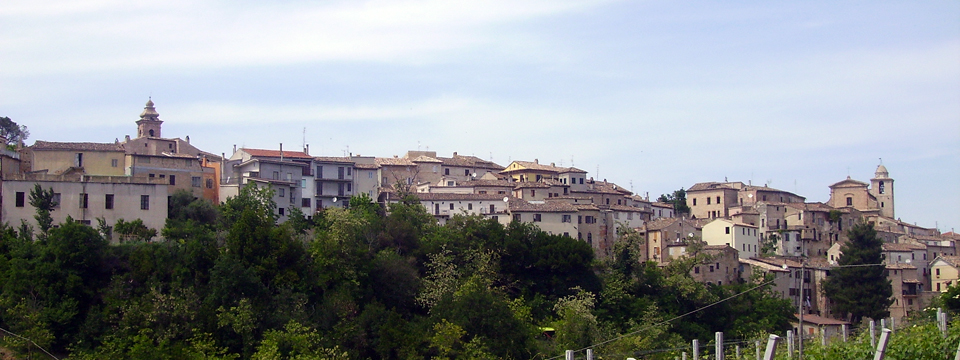

- Location within Italy Location within Marche
- Coordinates: 43°2′N 13°36′E
- Country: Italy
- Region: Marche
- Province: Province of Fermo (FM)

Area
  - Total: 7.0 km^{2} (2.7 sq mi)

Population (Dec. 2004)
  - Total: 834
  - Density: 120/km^{2} (310/sq mi)
- Time zone: UTC+1 (CET)
  - Summer (DST): UTC+2 (CEST)
- Postal code: 63020
- Dialing code: 0734

Ortezzano is a comune (municipality) in the Province of Fermo in the Italian region Marche, located about 70 kilometres (43 mi) south of Ancona and about 20 kilometres (12 mi) north of Ascoli Piceno. As of 31 December 2004, it had a population of 834 and an area of 7.0 square kilometres (2.7 mi^{2}).

Ortezzano borders the following municipalities: Carassai, Montalto delle Marche, Monte Rinaldo, Monte Vidon Combatte, Montottone.

== Demographic evolution ==
Historical population

Year	Pop.	±%
1861	868	—
1871	921	+6.1%
1881	870	−5.5%
1901	1,047	+20.3%
1911	1,113	+6.3%

Year	Pop.	±%
1921	1,140	+2.4%
1931	1,196	+4.9%
1936	1,279	+6.9%
1951	1,262	−1.3%
1961	1,095	−13.2%

Year	Pop.	±%
1971	864	−21.1%
1981	806	−6.7%
1991	819	+1.6%
2001	832	+1.6%

Source: Data from ISTAT
