= Torre San Patrizio =

- Comune
- Comune di Torre San Patrizio
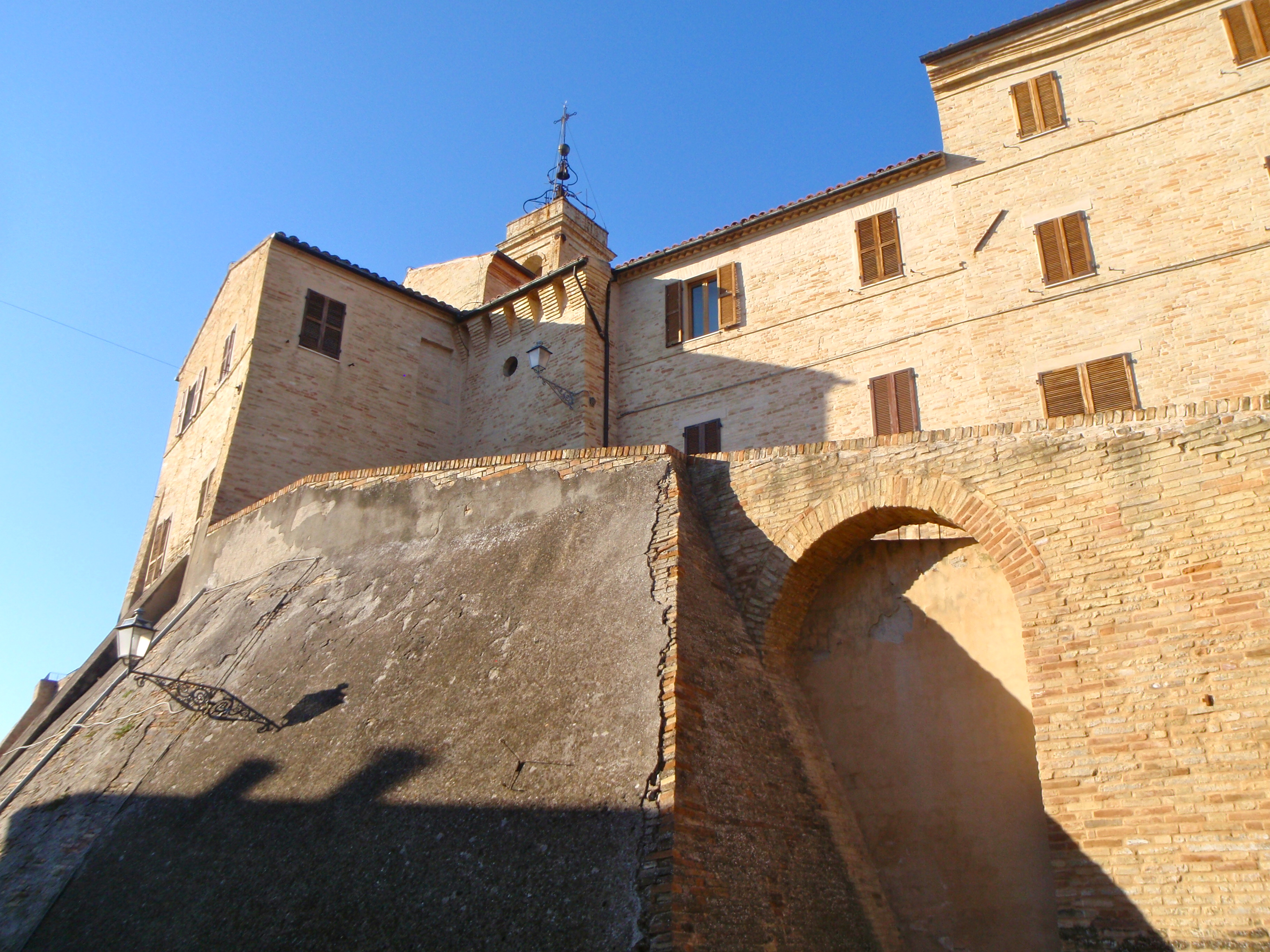

- Location within Italy Location within Marche
- Coordinates: 43°11′N 13°37′E
- Country: Italy
- Region: Marche
- Province: Fermo (FM)
- Frazioni: Santa Maria d'Ete, San Venanzo

Government
  - Mayor: Luca Leoni

Area
  - Total: 11.9 km^{2} (4.6 sq mi)
- Elevation: 224 m (735 ft)

Population (31 December 2008)
  - Total: 2,153
  - Density: 181/km^{2} (469/sq mi)
- Demonym: Torresi
- Time zone: UTC+1 (CET)
  - Summer (DST): UTC+2 (CEST)
- Postal code: 63010
- Dialing code: 0734
- Patron saint: St. Patrick
- Saint day: 17 March
- Website: Official website

Torre San Patrizio (pronounced [ˈtorre sam paˈtrittsjo]) is a commune (municipality) in the Province of Fermo in the Italian region of Marche, located about 50 kilometres (31 mi) south of Ancona and about 35 kilometres (22 mi) north of Ascoli Piceno.

In medieval times it was a free commune; later it was subjected to Cesare Borgia, the Sforza and the Papal States. It has 14th- to 15th-century walls.

== Notable people ==
- Felipe Rutini (1866-1919), Italo-Argentine winemaker
