= Montemonaco =

- Comune
- Comune di Montemonaco
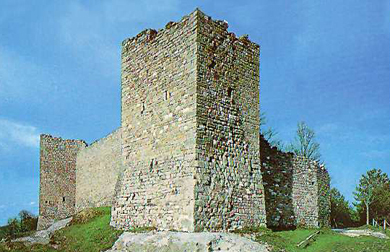
- Torrioni on Montemonaco walls

- Coat of arms

- Location within Italy Location within Marche
- Coordinates: 42°54′N 13°20′E
- Country: Italy
- Region: Marche
- Province: Ascoli Piceno (AP)
- Frazioni: Altino, Ariconi, Cerqueto, Cese, Cittadella, Colleregnone, Collina, Ferrà, Foce, Isola San Biagio, Lanciatoio, Le Castagne, Le Vigne, Pescolle, Pignotti, Poggio di pietra, Rascio, Rivo Rosso, Rocca, Rocca da capo, Ropaga, San Giorgio all'Isola, San Lorenzo, Tofe, Vallefiume, Vallegrascia.

Government
  - Mayor: Onorato Corbelli

Area
  - Total: 67.52 km^{2} (26.07 sq mi)
- Elevation: 980 m (3,220 ft)

Population (28 February 2010)
  - Total: 658
  - Density: 9.75/km^{2} (25.2/sq mi)
- Demonym: Montemonachesi
- Time zone: UTC+1 (CET)
  - Summer (DST): UTC+2 (CEST)
- Postal code: 63048
- Dialing code: 0736
- Patron saint: St. Sebastian
- Saint day: January 20

Montemonaco is a town and comune (municipality) in Marche region, located about 150 kilometres (93 mi) north-east from Rome. It is located within Sibillini Mountains, along Aso valley, on a plateau facing the Mount Zampa and Mount Sibilla. Nearby are located Mount Vector and the Pilatus Lake.

Montemonaco ("MonkMount") takes its name from a Benedictine monastery founded here around the 8th century.

Montemonaco was slightly affected by recent earthquakes.
