= Porto Sant'Elpidio =

- Comune
- Comune di Porto Sant'Elpidio
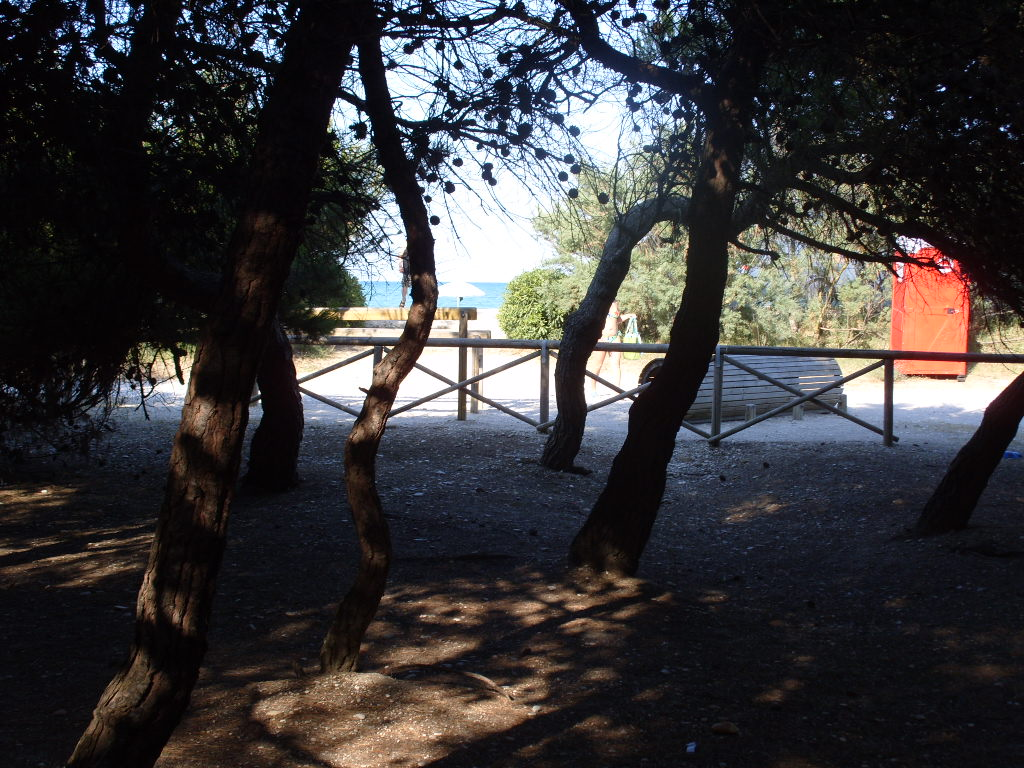
- The pinewood which goes along with the promenade

- Location within Italy Location within Marche
- Coordinates: 43°16′N 13°45′E
- Country: Italy
- Region: Marche
- Province: Fermo (FM)
- Frazioni: Cretarola, Corva

Government
  - Mayor: Massimiliano Ciarpella

Area
  - Total: 18.14 km^{2} (7.00 sq mi)
- Elevation: 4 m (13 ft)

Population (31 December 2008)
  - Total: 25,118
  - Density: 1,385/km^{2} (3,586/sq mi)
- Demonym: Portoelpidiensi
- Time zone: UTC+1 (CET)
  - Summer (DST): UTC+2 (CEST)
- Postal code: 63821
- Dialing code: 0734
- ISTAT code: 109034
- Patron saint: Crispin of Soissons
- Saint day: 25 October
- Website: Official website

Porto Sant'Elpidio (Italian pronunciation: [ˈpɔrto santelˈpiːdjo]) is a coastal town in the province of Fermo, Marche, Italy. The commune has a population of 25,071.

== Geography ==
Porto Sant'Elpidio's almost 8 kilometres of coastline once made it the largest municipality in length in the province of Ascoli Piceno before the province of Fermo was separated from it. The municipality develops mainly along the coast, following both State Road 16 and the Adriatic railway line.

The territory of the city lies between the Chienti (north) and Tenna (south) rivers. Today, following the strong demographic increase in recent years, development continues on the low hills that rise immediately inland from State Road 16; the Corva and Cretarola districts are the highest point of the town's territory, with interesting views of the sea.

== History ==
The history of Porto Sant'Elpidio is relatively short. Excavations within the municipal territory have uncovered important archaeological finds, confirming the presence of Etruscan burials dating back to the 8th century BC. Renaissance maps record a small village on the coast, with the name Porto San Lupidio, with a sea rich in fish and not far from Castrum Castri, now known as Fermo. Despite the passage of years and continued immigration from southern Italy, the village remained small until 1952, when it gained municipal independence from Sant'Elpidio a Mare, changing its name from Porto di Sant'Elpidio a Mare to Porto Sant'Elpidio.

The State Railways stations favoured a strong increase in population and immigration from other parts of the country. One event linked to the railway was the visit of Prince Umberto di Savoia to the city. His name is remembered in an agreement with State Road 16, which urbanistically divides the city.

Another important event was the flood of 1950. In those days, torrential rains swelled the beds of the Chienti and Tenna rivers and the absolute lack of a sewerage system aggravated the problem. In less than a day, large quantities of mud and water invaded the roads, hampering the arrival of the scarce relief supplies and destroying many small houses and crops. Recovery from this disaster was slow, but life resumed some time later.

== Coat of arms ==
Porto Sant'Elpidio's coat of arms is relatively recent. It is a Samnite shield; a top band shows the sea, with a boat sailing very simply (it represents the work of fishermen) and the sun. On the lower band, on the red bottom the worker bee is depicted, to signify the laborious nature of Porto Sant'Elpidio's inhabitants. On the top of the shield is the crown to the five towers (they represent the commune) that were approved on 19 May 1965 at the site of the crown to nine blackbirds after the independence from Sant'Elpidio a Mare. Below the shield there is a Latin text In Litore Fulget ("Shines on the beach") to indicate the city's coast.

== Places of interest ==
The Porto Sant'Elpidio pine forest, overlooking the sea. It is bordered by a cycle path. Villa Murri, a historic residence, built in the early 19th century by the Sinibaldi counts, passed to the counts Maggiori di Fermo around 1880 and in 1920 to the Murri family, who sold it to the municipality in 1953. The Italian director M. Bolognini set the final scene of the film “Fatti di gente per bene” there, inspired by the true story of some members of the Murri family who lived there. Villa Maroni, home of the landowning family of the same name in the Corva district/fraction. Villa Baruchello, endowed with a splendid park with rare tree essences; recently renovated, it is the site of intense cultural conference activities. Villa Fanny, which cannot be visited, is one of the many homes of landowners who owned land after the Maroni dynasty in the Corva and Fonteserpe neighbourhoods. Lido tre case, northern part of the littoral, a place of special interest from a naturalistic point of view. Cineteatro Moderno, located in the town centre: built in the 1930s, it was active until the 1970s. Long abandoned to decay, it is now the focus of a radical architectural renovation.

== Demographic evolution ==
The commune of Porto Sant'Elpidio has never had a uniquely local population. From the original residents not many people remain; in fact, the commune, with the construction of the Concimificio FIM and the presence of still-fertile agricultural lands, has attracted many people from all over Italy, allowing a strong Italian melting pot. Nowadays, the commune hosts many foreign immigrants from, China, India, Pakistan, Bangladesh and all over the African continent.

== Associations ==
The Casa del Volontariato (House of Charity Work) hosts all the main voluntary associations present in the communal territory. The association leader is the P.A. Green Cross section Sandro Garbini.

== Culture ==
Theater of the Bees was inaugurated in the year 2006 with Neri Marcorè as the artistic director. In the summer season, Theaters of the World, an international theatre festival for children, is held.

== Economy ==
At the beginning of the 19th century, the construction of the Concimificio FIM created a considerable increase in the local economy which was previously based on fishing and agriculture. A large contribution to the port's economy came from Costanza Maggiori, descended from the noble family of Corsican origins. Since the 1960s the footwear industry has been the main economic activity, while the agricultural sector has decreased significantly in importance. In the southern district area (called Faleriense) the practice of small-boat fishing still continues. The city has seen in recent years an increase in the tourism sector based on sunbathing from national and international tourists.

== Sport ==
On 28 May 1992, the fourth stage of the Giro d'Italia ended in Porto Sant'Elpidio with the winner Mario Cipollini.

The soccer team from Porto Sant'Elpidio plays still in Promozione.

The most important local sporting reality is the Porto Sant'Elpidio Basketball club which, for more than ten years, has participated in the national championships and Series B2 Series C1 with excellent results. The club is sponsored by the Suolificio Stella srl.

== See also ==
- Sant'Elpidio a Mare
