= Petritoli =

- Comune
- Comune di Petritoli
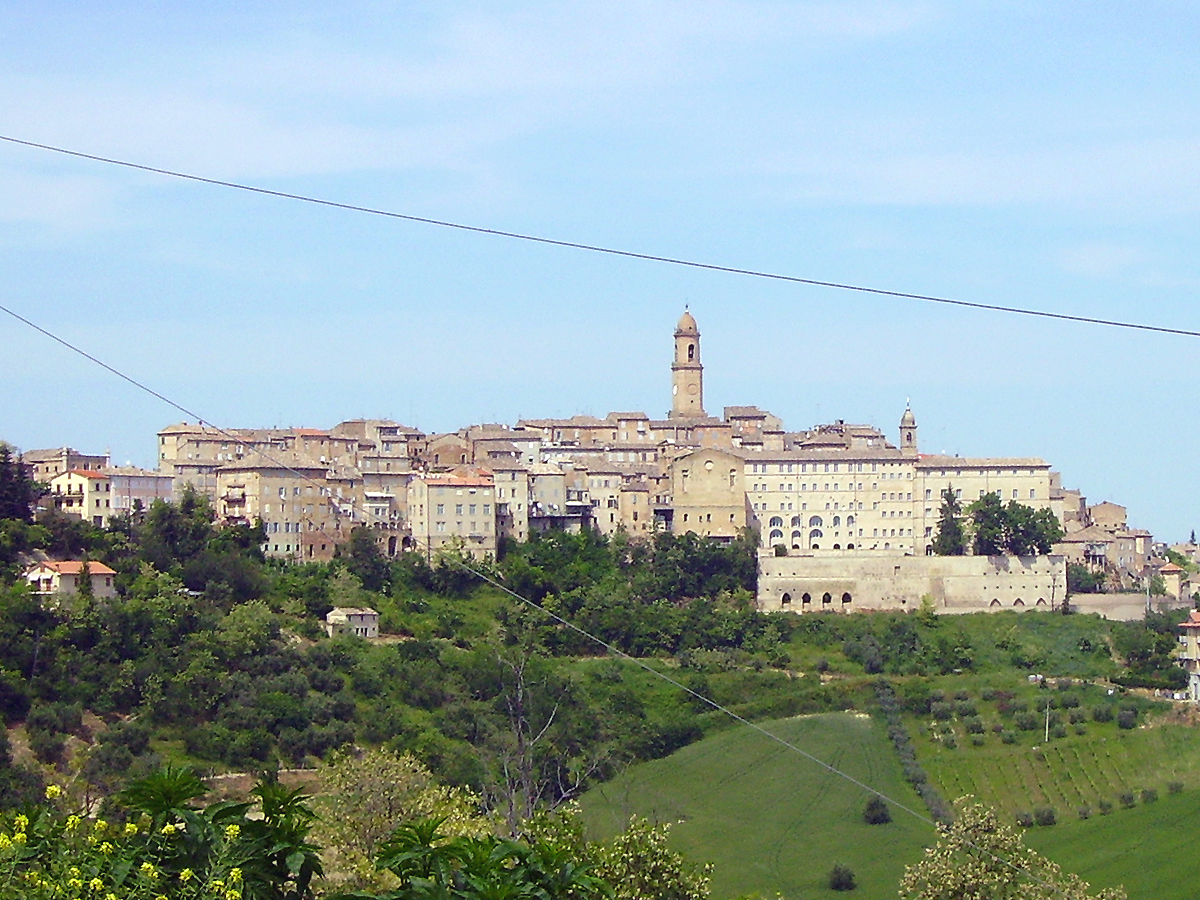

- Coat of arms

- Location within Italy Location within Marche
- Coordinates: 43°4′N 13°39′E
- Country: Italy
- Region: Marche
- Province: Fermo (FM)
- Frazioni: Moregnano, Valmir

Government
  - Mayor: Luca Pezzani

Area
  - Total: 23.8 km^{2} (9.2 sq mi)
- Elevation: 358 m (1,175 ft)

Population (31 October 2009)
  - Total: 2,494
  - Density: 105/km^{2} (271/sq mi)
- Demonym: Petritolesi
- Time zone: UTC+1 (CET)
  - Summer (DST): UTC+2 (CEST)
- Postal code: 63027
- Dialing code: 0734
- Patron saint: St. John the Baptist
- Saint day: 24 June

Petritoli is a comune (municipality) in the Province of Fermo in the Italian region Marche, located about 90 kilometres (56 mi) south of Ancona and about 50 kilometres (31 mi) north of Ascoli Piceno.

Petritoli borders the following municipalities: Carassai, Monte Giberto, Monte Vidon Combatte, Montefiore dell'Aso, Monterubbiano, Ponzano di Fermo. It is one of I Borghi più belli d'Italia ("The most beautiful villages of Italy").

== Twin towns ==
- Vidor, Italy
