= Province of Fermo =

Province of Italy

Coordinates: 43°9′37.51″N 13°43′5.16″E

Province of Fermo Provincia di Fermo (Italian)
- Province
- Coat of arms

- Location of the province of Fermo in Italy
- Country: Italy
- Region: Marche
- Capital(s): Fermo
- Municipalities: 40

Government
  - President: Michele Ortenzi

Area
  - Total: 862.77 km^{2} (333.12 sq mi)

Population (2026)
  - Total: 166,772
  - Density: 193.30/km^{2} (500.64/sq mi)

GDP
  - Total: €4.202 billion (2015)
  - Per capita: €23,875 (2015)
- Time zone: UTC+1 (CET)
  - Summer (DST): UTC+2 (CEST)
- Postal code: 63900
- Telephone prefix: 0734, 0736
- Vehicle registration: FM
- ISTAT code: 109
- Website: www.provincia.fermo.it

The province of Fermo (Italian: provincia di Fermo) is a province in the region of Marche in Italy. It was established in 2004 and became operational in 2009. Its capital is the town of Fermo.

It has a population of 166,772 in an area of 862.77 square kilometres (333.12 sq mi) across its 40 municipalities.

== History ==
An 1861 report by Minister Minghetti to Prince Eugene of Savoy, Lieutenant of the King, justified merging the small and fragmented provinces of southern Marche into a single large province, a move to overcome the historical border between the Kingdom of the Two Sicilies and the Papal States. The residents of Abruzzo and Cardinal Filippo de Angelis were opposed to this. Despite this, 58% of the population of Fermo voted in favour of merging some smaller provinces, and the province of Ascoli-Fermo was created and became known as Ascoli Piceno.

In 2000, supporters of forming a new province of Fermo exploited a pact between the Lega Nord and Forza Italia who had formed a number of proposals regarding establishing provincial bodies, including one that later led to the foundation of the province of Monza and Brianza. Fabrizio Cesetti was the only signatory of the act forming the province, which was delayed due to the conclusion of the Legislature XIII of Italy. Following this, Law 147/2004 was passed, and the province of Fermo was established in 2004.

== Geography ==
The Province of Fermo is in the Marche region of central Italy, and stretches from the Sibillini Mountains to the Adriatic Sea. Its main geographic feature is the valley of the River Tenna. This river rises in the mountains, enters the province near Servigliano, passes through Grottazzolina and Montegiorgio, and reaches the sea near Sant'Elpidio a Mare and Porto Sant'Elpidio. The River Aso forms the southern border of the province, separating it from the Province of Ascoli Piceno. It rises in the mountains and flows into the Adriatic Sea at Pedaso. To the north of the province lies the Province of Macerata. Footwear and leather goods are produced in the area, and the main agricultural products are cereals, vegetables, grapes, olives and livestock.

The town of Fermo, the capital of the province, is an old town perched on a hill. It has a historic centre, a large piazza and a cathedral dating from 1227 with a Gothic facade. There are also traces of a Roman amphitheatre nearby. The neighbouring municipality of Porto San Giorgio has a castle dating from 1269, which protected the valley that leads to Fermo.

== Government ==
=== Municipalities ===
The province has 40 municipalities:

- Altidona
- Amandola
- Belmonte Piceno
- Campofilone
- Falerone
- Fermo
- Francavilla d'Ete
- Grottazzolina
- Lapedona
- Magliano di Tenna
- Massa Fermana
- Monsampietro Morico
- Montappone
- Monte Giberto
- Monte Rinaldo
- Monte San Pietrangeli
- Monte Urano
- Monte Vidon Combatte
- Monte Vidon Corrado
- Montefalcone Appennino
- Montefortino
- Montegiorgio
- Montegranaro
- Monteleone di Fermo
- Montelparo
- Monterubbiano
- Montottone
- Moresco
- Ortezzano
- Pedaso
- Petritoli
- Ponzano di Fermo
- Porto San Giorgio
- Porto Sant'Elpidio
- Rapagnano
- Sant'Elpidio a Mare
- Santa Vittoria in Matenano
- Servigliano
- Smerillo
- Torre San Patrizio

== Demographics ==
As of 2026, the population is 166,772, of which 49.2% are male, and 50.8% are female. Minors make up 13.5% of the population, and seniors make up 27.7%.

Historical population

Year	Pop.	±%
1861	97,818	—
1871	101,477	+3.7%
1881	102,041	+0.6%
1901	114,761	+12.5%
1911	120,653	+5.1%
1921	124,735	+3.4%
1931	130,018	+4.2%
1936	134,410	+3.4%

Year	Pop.	±%
1951	141,806	+5.5%
1961	147,321	+3.9%
1971	155,113	+5.3%
1981	160,513	+3.5%
1991	162,671	+1.3%
2001	166,218	+2.2%
2011	174,857	+5.2%
2021	168,294	−3.8%

Source: ISTAT

=== Immigration ===
As of 2025, immigrants make up 13.1% of the population. The five largest foreign countries of birth are Romania, China, Albania, Morocco, and Pakistan.
