= Amandola =

- Comune
- Comune di Amandola
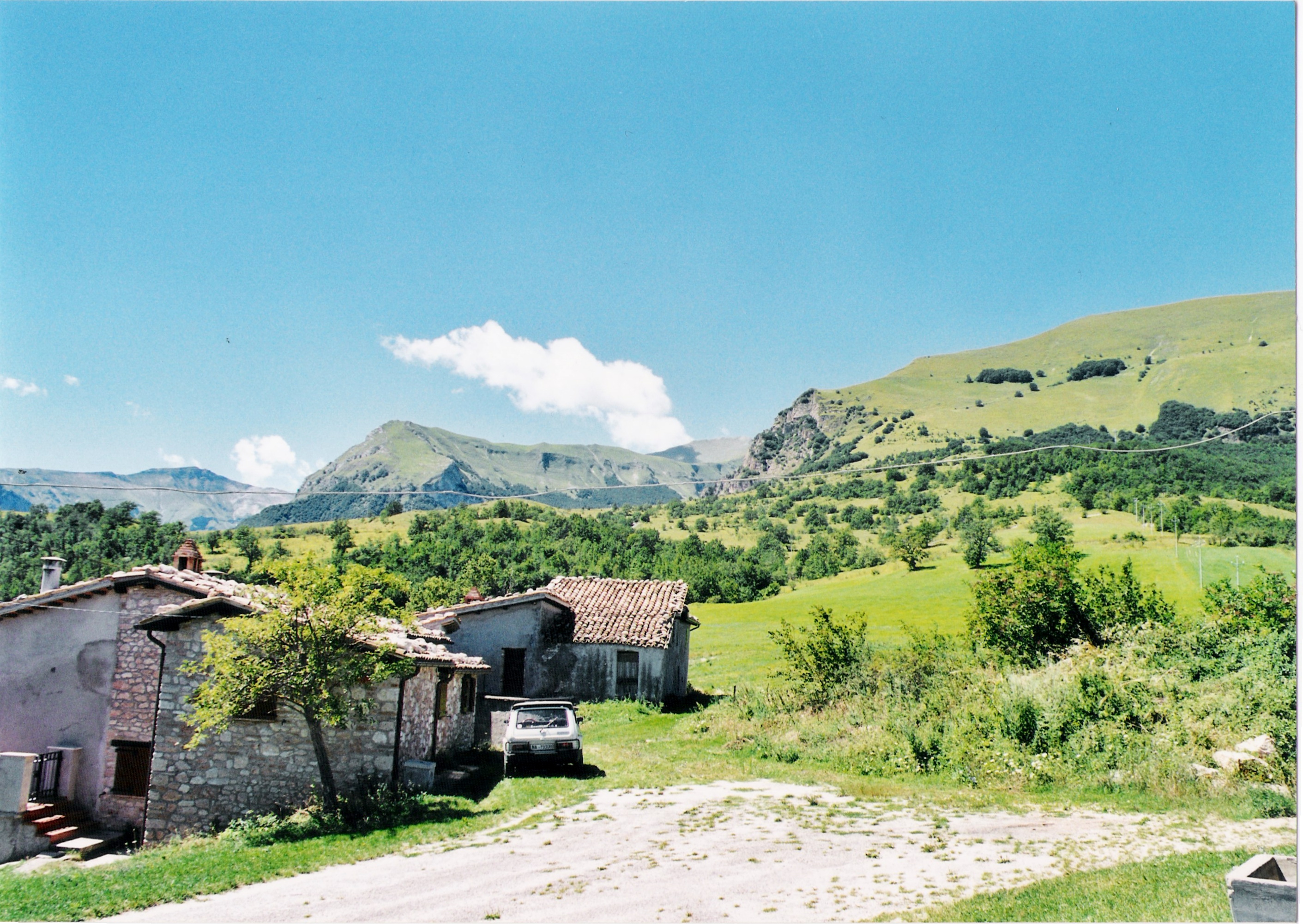
- View from the frazione of Casalicchio.

- Coat of arms

- Location of Amandola in Italy Amandola (Marche)
- Coordinates: 42°59′N 13°21′E
- Country: Italy
- Region: Marche
- Province: Fermo (FM)
- Frazioni: Bore, Botundoli, Buzzaccheri, Campo di Masci, Capovalle, Casa Coletta, Casa di Carlo, Casa Innamorati, Casalicchio, Casa Paradisi Inferiore, Casa Paradisi Superiore, Casa Tasso, Cese, Ciaraglia, Colle San Fortunato, Colle Turano, Coriconi, Corvellari, Francalancia, Garulla Inferiore, Garulla Superiore, Le Piane, Marnacchia, Merli, Moglietta, Montane, Paolucci, Paterno, Rustici, Salvi, San Cristoforo, San Ruffino, Sant' Ippolito, Scagnoli, Taccarelli, Vena, Verri, Vesciano, Vidoni, Villa Conti, Villa Fiorentina

Government
  - Mayor: Adolfo Marinangeli

Area
  - Total: 69.5 km^{2} (26.8 sq mi)
- Elevation: 500 m (1,600 ft)

Population (30 November 2017)
  - Total: 3,571
  - Density: 51.4/km^{2} (133/sq mi)
- Demonym: Amandolesi
- Time zone: UTC+1 (CET)
  - Summer (DST): UTC+2 (CEST)
- Postal code: 63857
- Dialing code: 0736
- Patron saint: Blessed Antonio Migliorati
- Saint day: 25 January
- Website: Official website

Amandola is a comune (municipality) in the Province of Fermo in the Italian region Marche, located about 70 kilometres (43 mi) south of Ancona, about 25 kilometres (16 mi) northwest of Ascoli Piceno and about 35 kilometres (22 mi) west of Fermo. The town was founded in 1248 by the union of the castles of Agello, Leone and Marrubbione, which formed a free municipality.

Amandola is one of the 18 Italian municipalities located within the Monti Sibillini National Park.

Amandola was damaged by the earthquake in Central Italy (near Amatrice) on 24 August 2016.
