= Rapagnano =

- Comune
- Comune di Rapagnano
- Location within Italy Location within Marche
- Coordinates: 43°10′N 13°36′E
- Country: Italy
- Region: Marche
- Province: Fermo (FM)
- Frazioni: Piane di Rapagnano

Government
  - Mayor: Remigio Ceroni

Area
  - Total: 12.5 km^{2} (4.8 sq mi)
- Elevation: 314 m (1,030 ft)

Population (31 December 2008)
  - Total: 2,009
  - Density: 161/km^{2} (416/sq mi)
- Demonym: Rapagnanesi
- Time zone: UTC+1 (CET)
  - Summer (DST): UTC+2 (CEST)
- Postal code: 63020
- Dialing code: 0734

Rapagnano is a comune (municipality) in the Province of Fermo in the Italian region Marche, located about 50 kilometres (31 mi) south of Ancona and about 35 kilometres (22 mi) north of Ascoli Piceno.
