= Monte Vidon Corrado =

- Comune
- Comune di Monte Vidon Corrado
- Coat of arms

- Location within Italy Location within Marche
- Coordinates: 43°7′N 13°29′E
- Country: Italy
- Region: Marche
- Province: Fermo (FM)

Government
  - Mayor: Andrea Scorolli

Area
  - Total: 6.0 km^{2} (2.3 sq mi)
- Elevation: 429 m (1,407 ft)

Population (31 August 2010)
  - Total: 840
  - Density: 140/km^{2} (360/sq mi)
- Demonym: Montevidonesi
- Time zone: UTC+1 (CET)
  - Summer (DST): UTC+2 (CEST)
- Postal code: 63020
- Dialing code: 0734
- Patron saint: San Vito di Lucania
- Saint day: 15 June
- Website: Official website

Monte Vidon Corrado is a comune (municipality) in the Province of Fermo in the Italian region Marche, located about 60 kilometres (37 mi) south of Ancona and about 30 kilometres (19 mi) northwest of Ascoli Piceno.

== Main Attractions ==
- CASA MUSEO OSVALDO LICINI (museum)
- Church of San Vito Martire
- Church of Santa Maria delle Grazie in Contrada Gagliano
- Municipal Library

== Local food items ==
- Sausage - Marche sausage is a traditional product, made with pork, black pepper and other spices. It can be grilled or used to flavour typical dishes.
- Falerone Salami - This salami, typical of the area, is made with pork and spices. It has a compact texture and rich flavour, making it perfect to be enjoyed alone or with cheese and bread.
- Ciauscolo - This cured meat is one of the best known in the area, characterised by a soft and spreadable texture. Ciauscolo is made from minced pork, bacon and spices, and is typically flavoured with red wine. It is often eaten spread on fresh bread or bruschetta.
- Fossa cheese - This cheese is particularly known for its intense and distinctive flavour. It is matured in underground pits which gives it a characteristic aroma. It is a hard cheese, usually made from sheep's or cow's milk.
- Plant of Falerone olive oil - It is a high quality product typical of the Monte Vidon Corrado area and neighbouring municipalities in the Marche region. Piantone di Falerone is a native olive variety, appreciated for its organoleptic characteristics and disease resistance.
