= Altidona =

- Comune
- Comune di Altidona
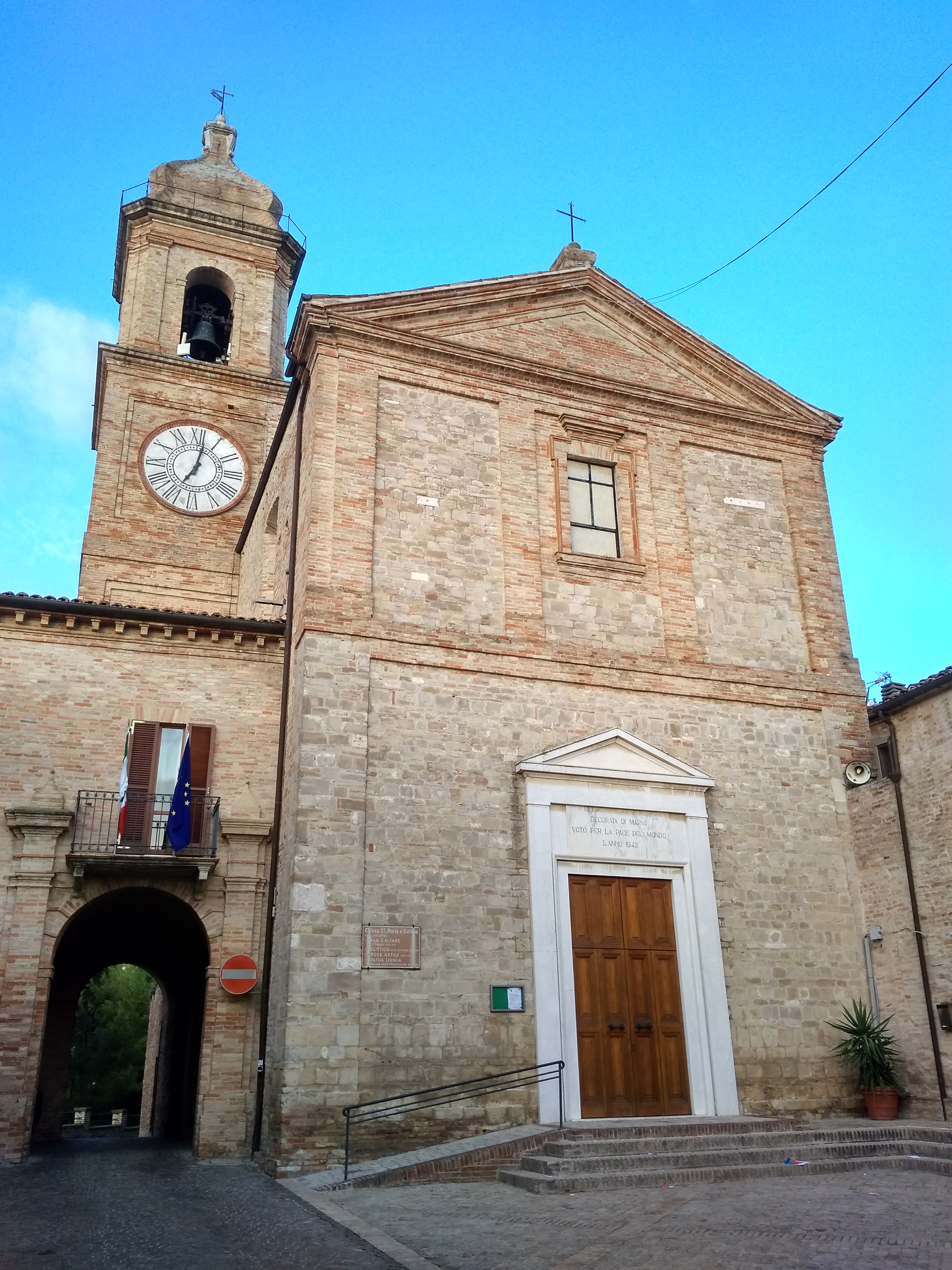
- Church of Santa Maria e San Ciriaco

- Location of Altidona in Italy Altidona (Marche)
- Coordinates: 43°7′N 13°48′E
- Country: Italy
- Region: Marche
- Province: Fermo (FM)
- Frazioni: Marina di Altidona

Government
  - Mayor: Giuliana Porrà

Area
  - Total: 12.97 km^{2} (5.01 sq mi)
- Elevation: 224 m (735 ft)

Population (30 April 2017)
  - Total: 3,410
  - Density: 263/km^{2} (681/sq mi)
- Demonym: Altidonesi
- Time zone: UTC+1 (CET)
  - Summer (DST): UTC+2 (CEST)
- Postal code: 63010
- Dialing code: 0734
- Patron saint: St. Cyriacus
- Saint day: 8 August
- Website: Official website

Altidona is a comune (municipality) in the Province of Fermo in the Italian region Marche, located about 60 kilometres (37 mi) southeast of Ancona and about 35 kilometres (22 mi) northeast of Ascoli Piceno. As of 31 December 2018, it had a population of 3,501 and an area of 12.97 square kilometres (5.01 mi^{2}).

== Main sights ==
- The walls
- Medieval watchtower of Belvedere
- Churches of Santa Maria and San Ciriaco
- Villa Montana and Roman cistern, location of the now disappeared medieval castle
- Parish church, with a painting by Vincenzo Pagani
