= Falerone =

- Comune
- Comune di Falerone
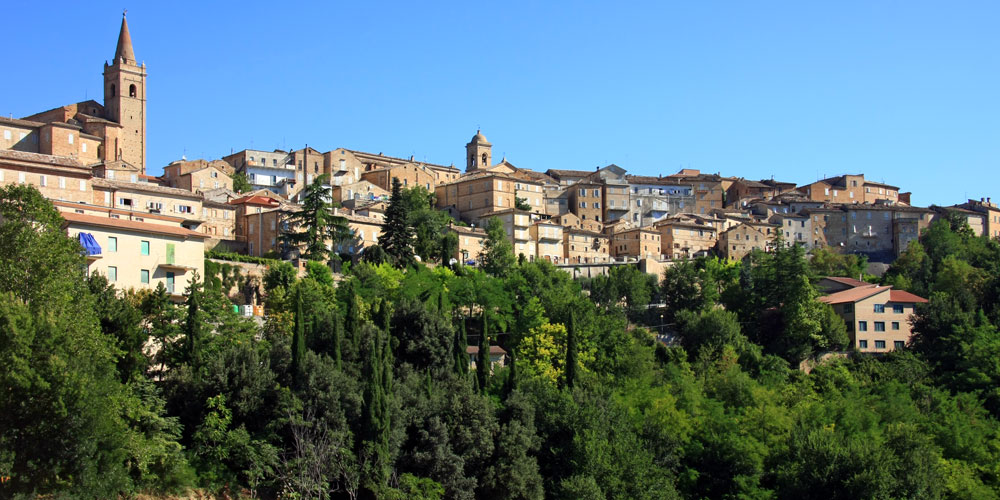

- Coat of arms

- Location within Italy Location within Marche
- Coordinates: 43°06′N 13°28′E
- Country: Italy
- Region: Marche
- Province: Fermo (FM)
- Frazioni: Piane di Falerone

Government
  - Mayor: Armando Altini

Area
  - Total: 24.61 km^{2} (9.50 sq mi)
- Elevation: 432 m (1,417 ft)

Population (31 July 2017)
  - Total: 3,344
  - Density: 135.9/km^{2} (351.9/sq mi)
- Time zone: UTC+1 (CET)
  - Summer (DST): UTC+2 (CEST)
- Postal code: 63837
- Dialing code: 0734
- Patron saint: St. Fortunatus of Todi
- Website: Official website

Falerone is a town and comune in the province of Fermo, in the Italian region of the Marche, southeast of Urbisaglia.

The impressive remains of the ancient Roman city of Falerio Picenus lie about 2 km from Falerone in the village of Piane di Falerone.

== History ==
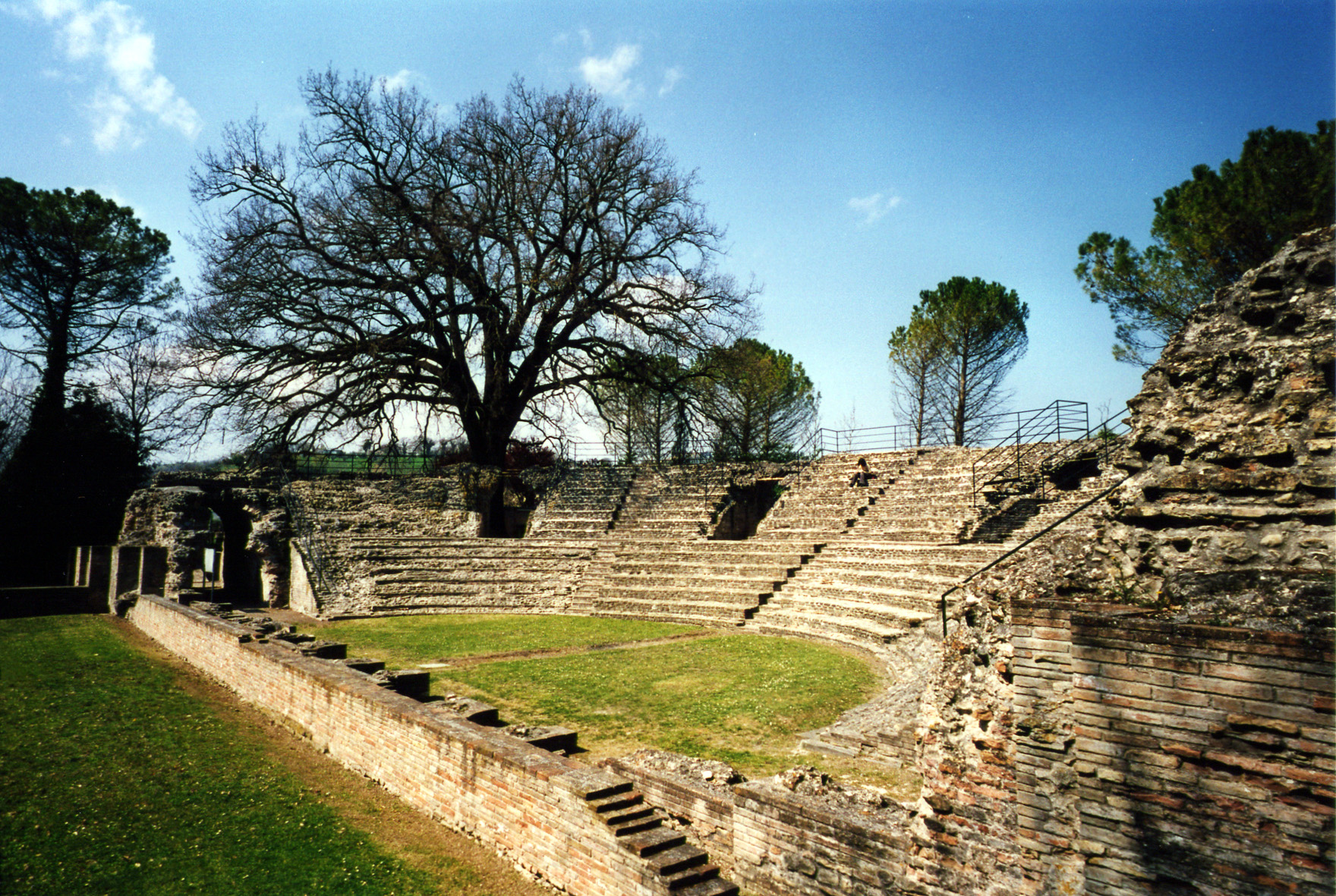
Roman Theatre

Falerio Picenus was probably founded as a colony for his veterans by Augustus after his victory at Actium in 29 BC. This area of the river Tenna plain had been densely populated by the Piceni since the archaic age and the city became a centre of some importance in the region of Picenum.

A question arose in the time of Domitian between the inhabitants of Falerio and Firmum as to land which had been taken out of the territory of the latter (which was recolonized by the triumvirs), and, though not distributed to the new settlers, had not been given back again to the people of Firmum. The emperor, by a rescript, a copy of which in bronze was found at Falerio, decided in favor of the people of Falerio, that the occupiers of this land should remain in possession of it.

In the Late Antiquity the city decayed, and in the Middle Ages it followed the history of the local lordships.

== The city ==
The economic and strategic importance of the area derived from the proximity of the Tenna river and the junction of the road coming from Fermo: one branch went along the river to Ascoli, the other towards Urbs Salvia. The city had an orthogonal (Hippodamian) street plan centred around the two orthogonal axes: the cardo, in a north-south direction coinciding with the current Via del Pozzo, and the decumanus which connected the theatre to the amphitheatre from east to west. From these two main streets the secondary ones branched off, which constituted the structure of the urban settlement. The city's perimeter stretched for about two miles.

== Main sights ==
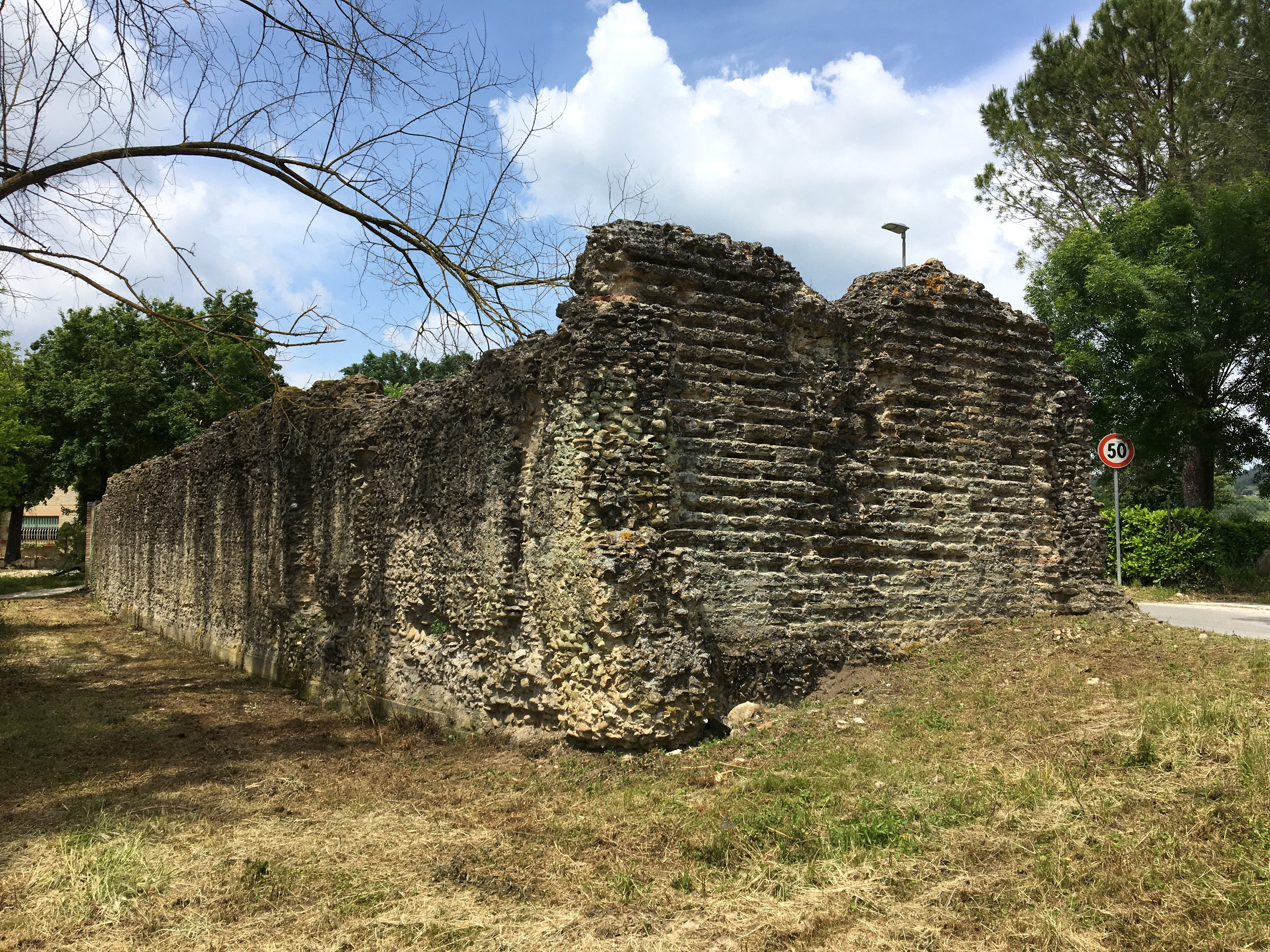
Bagno della Regina Cistern

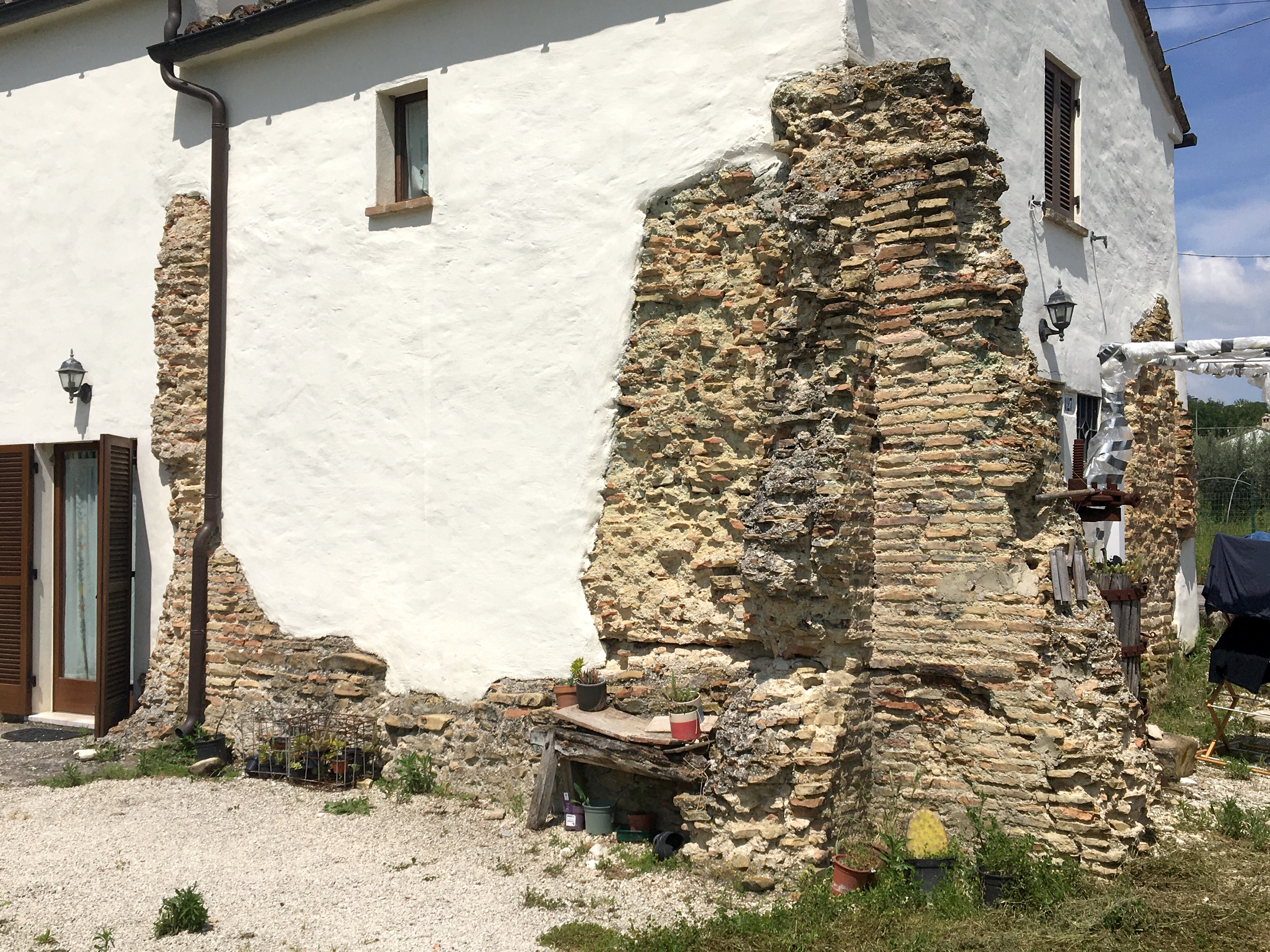
re-used Roman building

Considerable remains of the theatre with a capacity of around 1600 seats were excavated in 1838 and are still visible. Of the monumental construction, attributable to the Augustan age although completed under Tiberius and subsequently renovated several times, the first two levels of the cavea, the orchestra, the two side entrances, the proscenium and remains of the stage apparatus can still be admired. The cavea has a diameter of about 50 m and the third level was built on a vaulted gallery fronted by an arched façade of which numerous bases remain with semi-columns once covered with marble. The proscenium that delimits the orchestra is also well preserved with a structure of semicircular niches also decorated with marble. When the theatre was first excavated in 1777 with the sole purpose of enriching the Pope Pius Clementinus museum in Rome, the walls were still covered with coloured marbles and bronze fittings. From the theatre came two statues of Ceres and two more are in the Louvre. Its prestigious status in the city is shown by its embellishment with the statues donated by Antonia Picentina, priestess of Diva Faustina (wife of emperor Antoninus Pius) towards the middle of the second century AD.

The amphitheatre dates to the first century AD and held 6000 spectators. Its elliptical plan with the major east-west axis 120 m long, while the smaller one was about 105. It probably had twelve access doors, four of which gave directly into the arena, while the other eight gave access to the podium and seats which were divided into three different orders.

Between the two is a water reservoir (called Bagno della Regina) connected with remains of baths.

== Finds ==
Part of the De Minicis collection that remained in Falerone was transferred to the Town Hall in 1928 together with other finds donated by private individuals. The collection, in a completely renovated and expanded layout in recent years, was later housed in two wings of the former Convent of San Francesco.

The museum includes important finds including three large statues: two female twins from the Antonine age and one in a toga. There is also a male statue of Hellenistic tradition, a marble torso of a youthful deity, perhaps an Eros, and a female head. The main finds also include a headless herm of Heracles and a small torso of a male deity.

The epigraphic section is important, with a rich collection of inscriptions. Among which the most important are a dedication to Octavia of the Augustan age and another to the Goddess Cupra. Part of the section is a bronze tablet with the transcription of Domitian's rescript of 82 AD which deals with the dispute between the Faleronese and Fermani on the border territories.

Numerous finds from Falerio Picenus are also exhibited in important Italian and foreign museums. In the National Archaeological Museum of the Marche in Ancona there are a mosaic and other architectural elements, while in the Louvre in Paris there are a Perseus and a Nike. A precious mosaic floor is exhibited in the Vatican Museums, while in nearby Fermo a head of the emperor Augustus and a bronze steelyard are visible.
