= Grottazzolina =

- Comune
- Comune di Grottazzolina
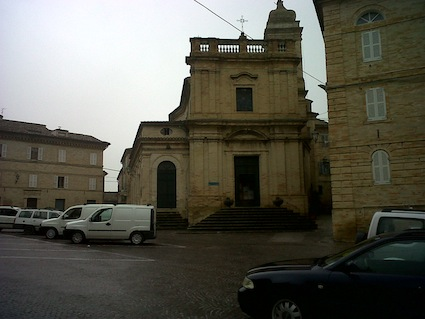

- Coat of arms

- Location within Italy Location within Marche
- Coordinates: 43°07′N 13°36′E
- Country: Italy
- Region: Marche
- Province: Fermo (FM)

Government
  - Mayor: Alberto Antognozzi (Rinascita grottese)

Area
  - Total: 9 km^{2} (3.5 sq mi)
- Elevation: 222 m (728 ft)

Population (30 June 2011)
  - Total: 3,370
  - Density: 370/km^{2} (970/sq mi)
- Demonym: Grottesi
- Time zone: UTC+1 (CET)
  - Summer (DST): UTC+2 (CEST)
- Postal code: 63024
- Dialing code: 0734
- Patron saint: Madonna del SS. Sacramento
- Saint day: First Sunday on June
- Website: Official website

Grottazzolina is a town and comune in the province of Fermo, in the Marche region of Italy.

== Twin towns - twin cities ==
- Várpalota, Hungary
