= 1472 Altarpiece =

Disassembled polyptych by Carlo Crivelli

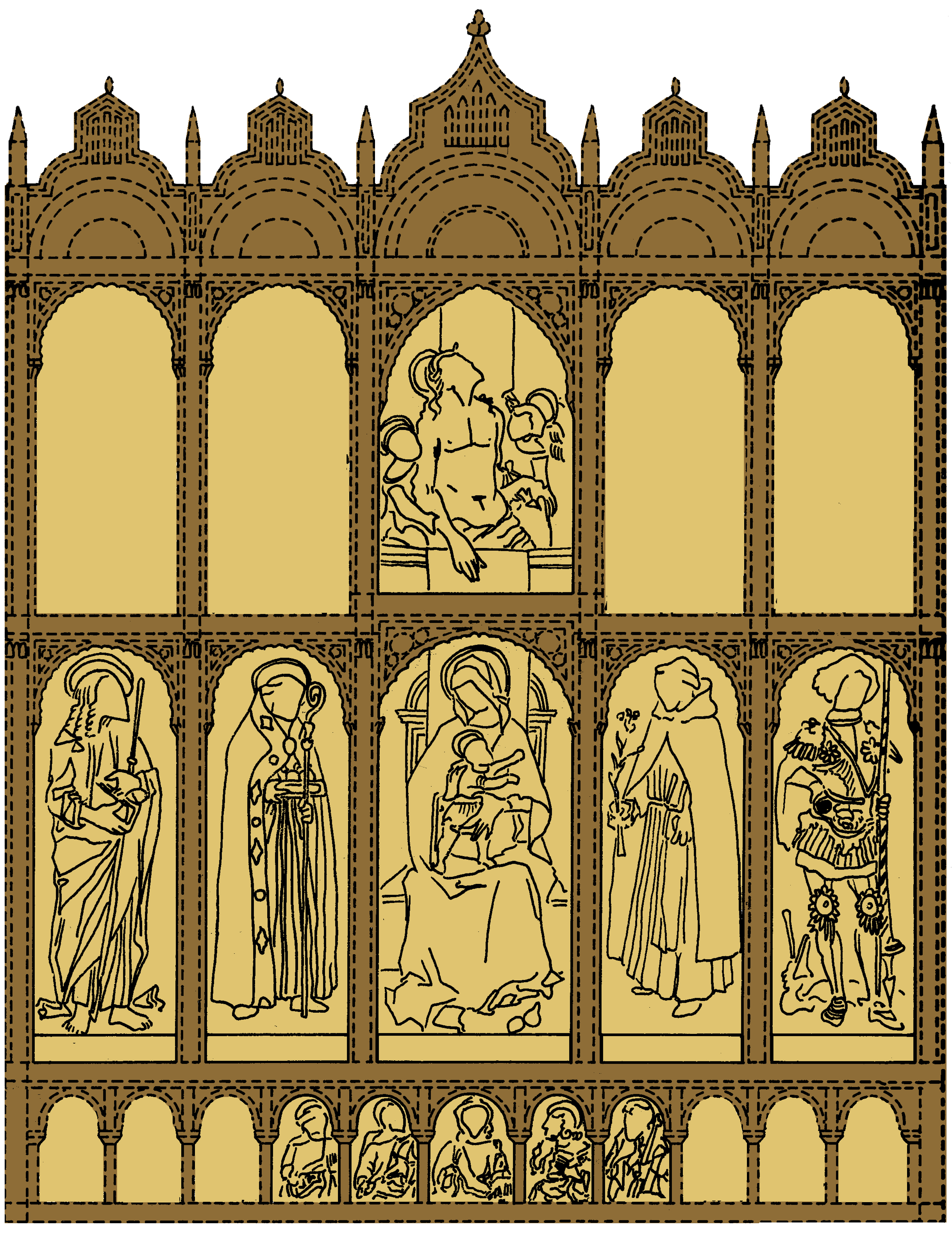
Scheme of the altarpiece

The 1472 Altarpiece was a tempera and oil on panel altarpiece by the Italian Renaissance painter Carlo Crivelli, dated 1472 on the central panel. Also known as the Fesch Altarpiece or the Eckinson Altarpiece, it is now divided up between a number of galleries in the United States and Europe.

The work probably originated in or near Fermo, in the Marche, where the artist was active for a number of years. In 1834 Amico Ricci wrote of a "Madonna with saints" by Crivelli from the church of San Domenico in Fermo which had been sold a few years earlier. It is stylistically close to the artist's Massa Fermana Altarpiece. It had five panels on the main register, topped by a Pietà which may have been flanked by four now-lost unidentified half-length saints.

== List of panels ==
An early reconstruction of the work was produced in 1933 by Adolfo Venturi and this was improved in 1958 by Bernard Berenson and in 1961 by Federico Zeri:

- top register
  - two half-length saints (lost)
  - Dead Christ Supported by Two Angels, 68x45 cm, Philadelphia Museum of Art
  - two half-length saints (lost)
- main register
  - St James, 95x39 cm, Brooklyn Museum, New York
  - St Nicholas of Bari, 96x32,5 cm, Cleveland Museum of Art
  - Linsky Madonna, 94x42 cm, Metropolitan Museum, New York
  - St Dominic, 94x27 cm, Metropolitan Museum, New York
  - St George, 95x33 cm, Metropolitan Museum, New York
- predella
  - St Peter, 29,3x21,5 cm, Yale University Art Gallery, New Haven
  - St Bartholomew, 28x15,5 cm, Pinacoteca del Castello Sforzesco, Milan
  - Christ Blessing, 28,8x26,2 cm, El Paso Museum of Art
  - St John the Evangelist, 28x15,5 cm, Pinacoteca del Castello Sforzesco, Milan
  - St Philip, 28x15,5 cm, E. Proehl collection, Amsterdam

== Possible reconstruction ==
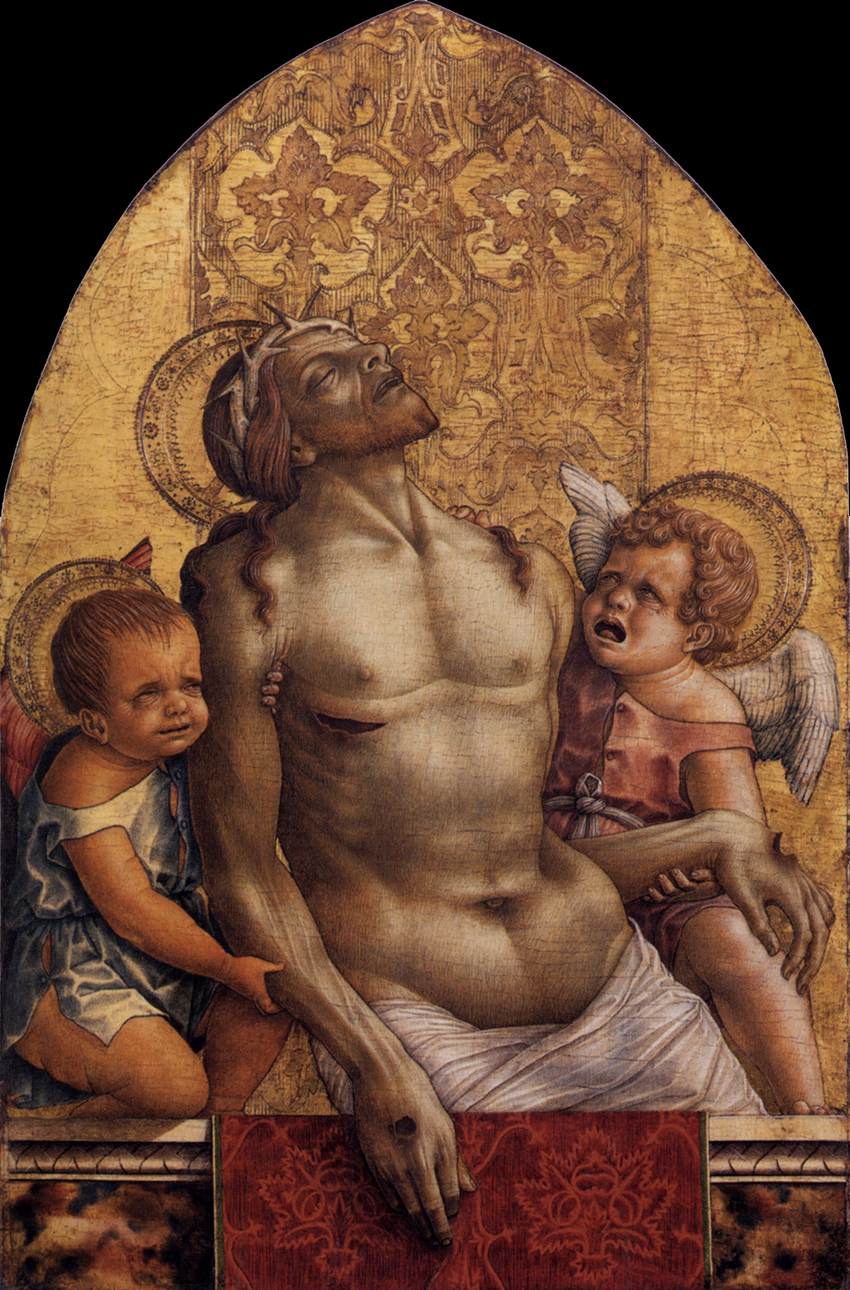

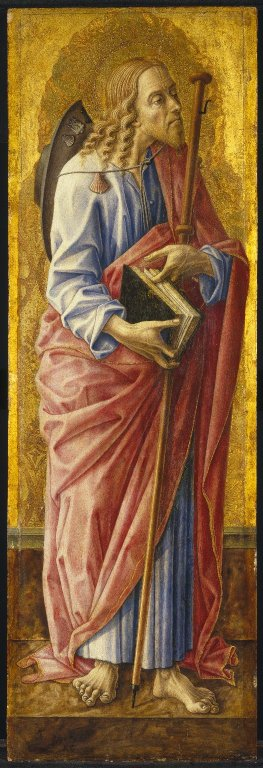

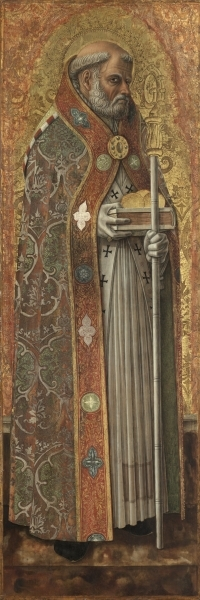

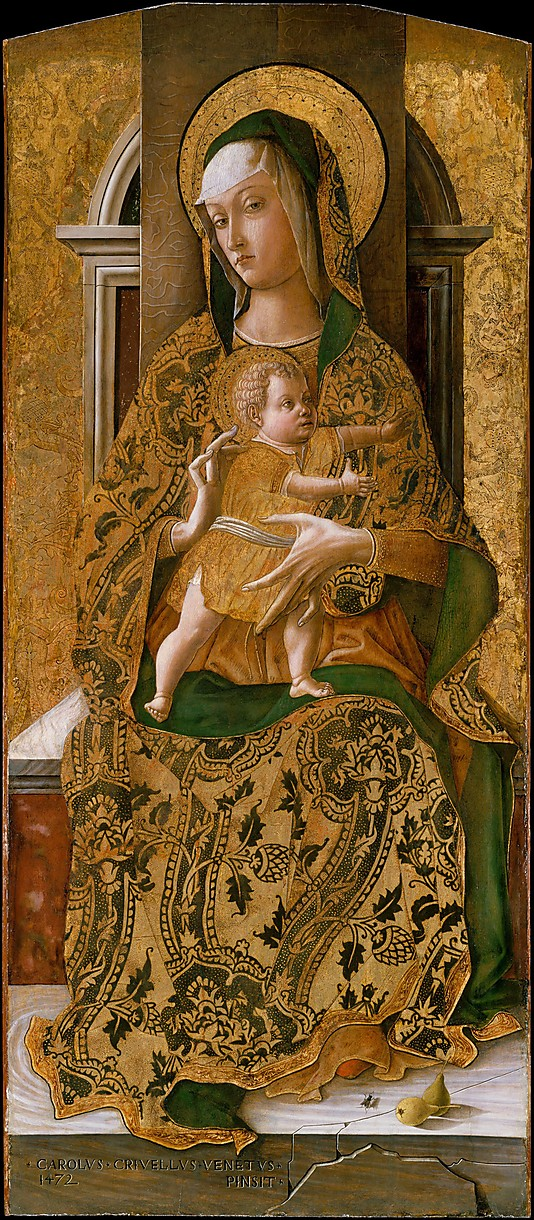

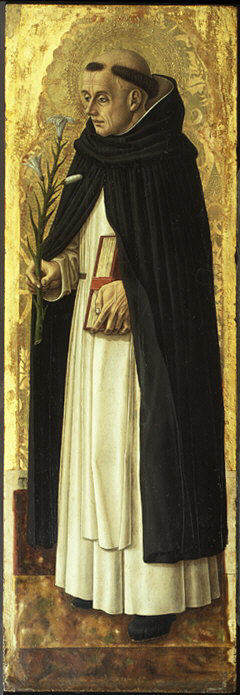

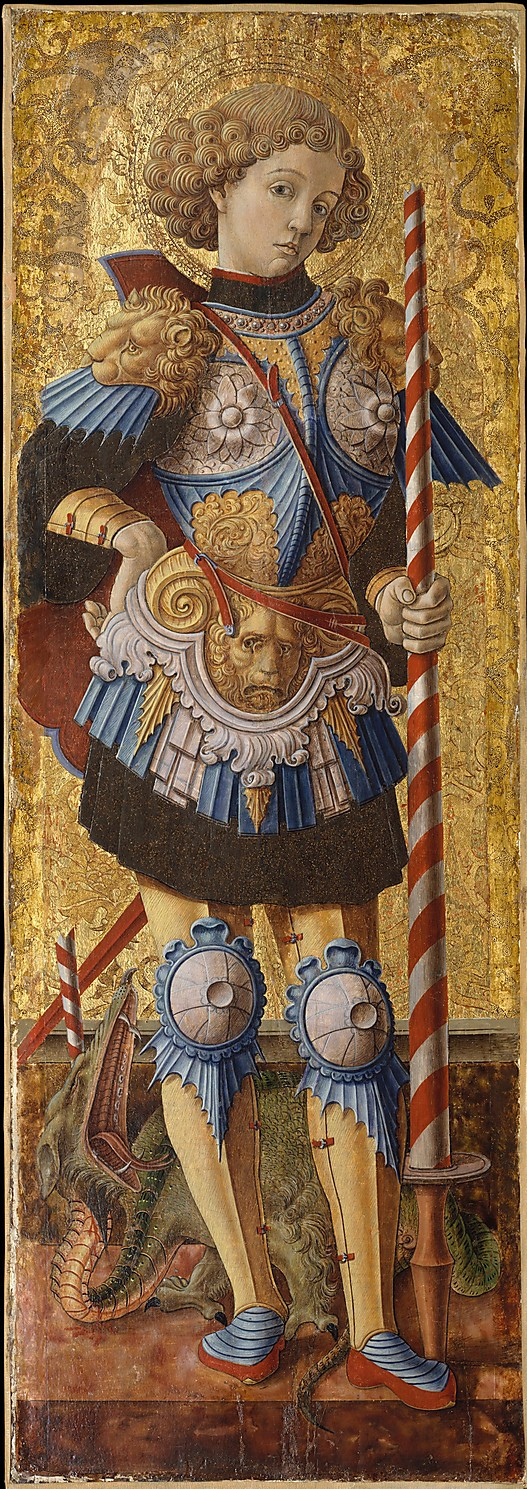

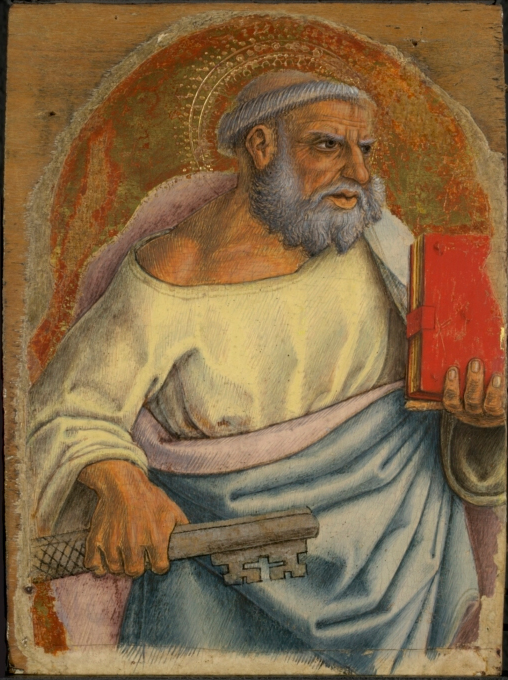
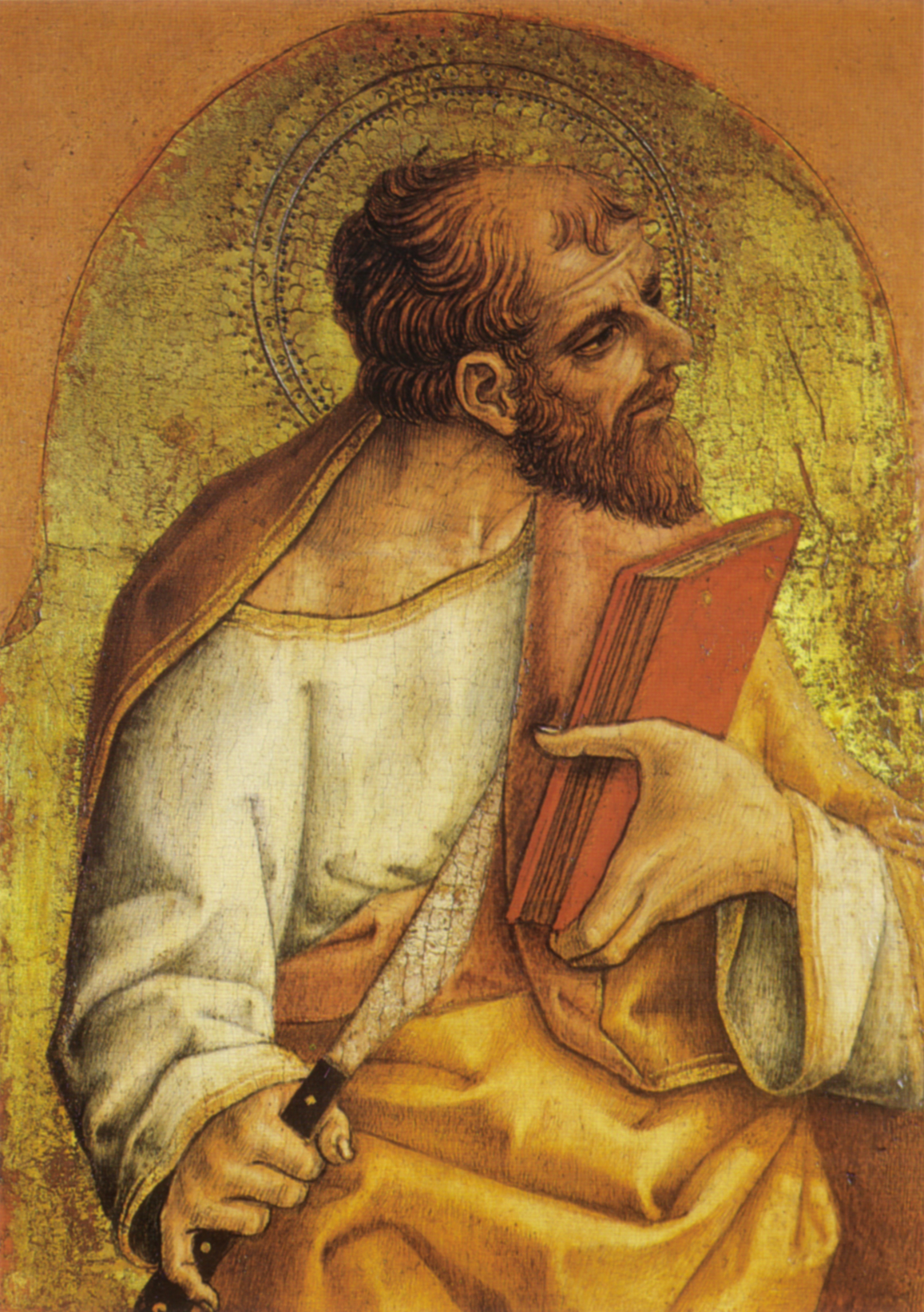
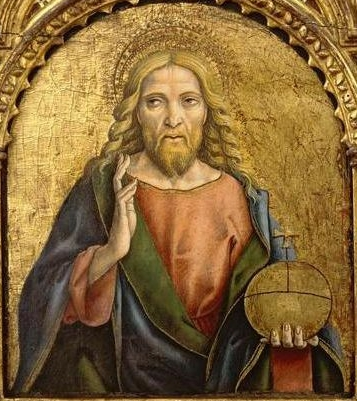
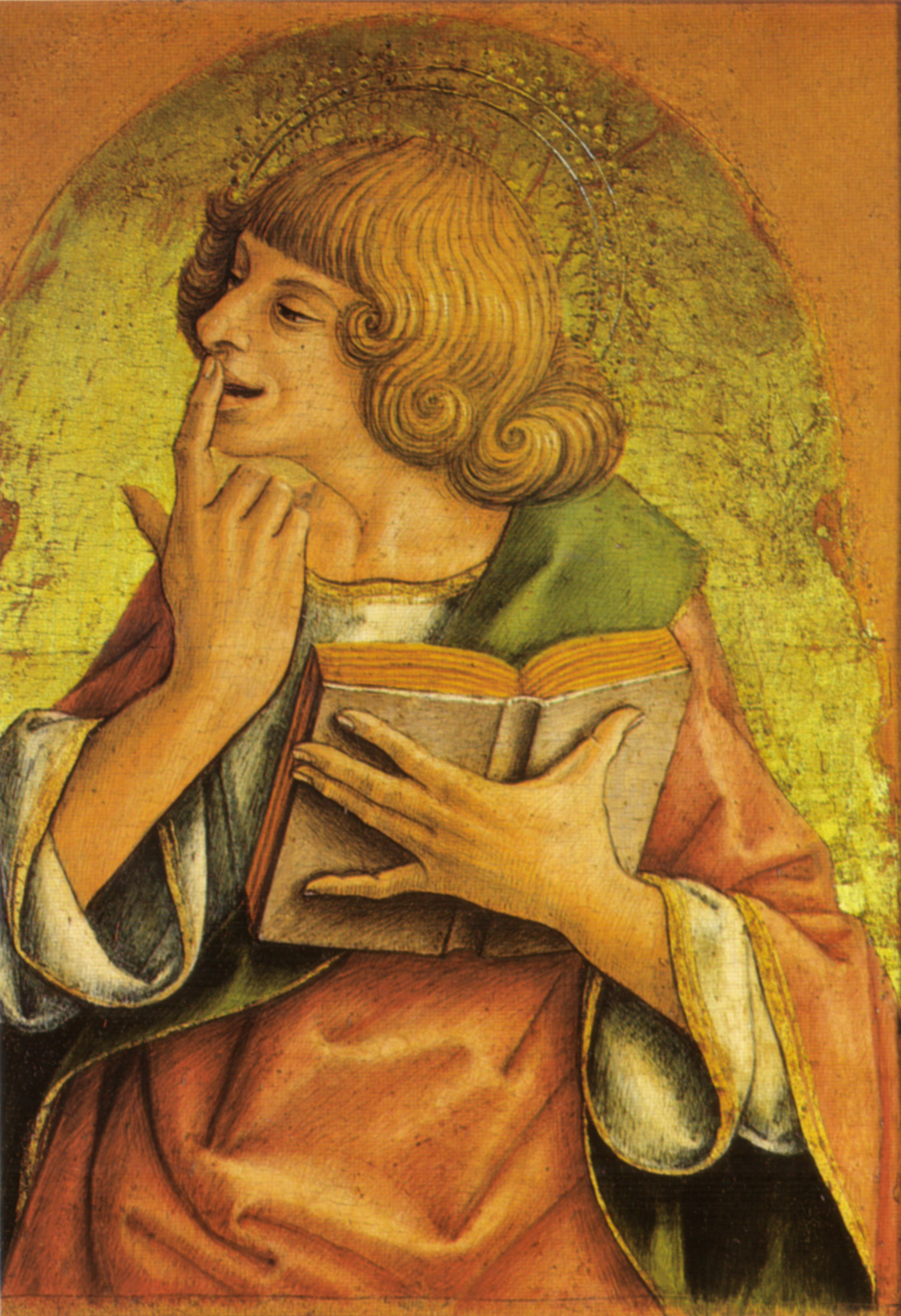
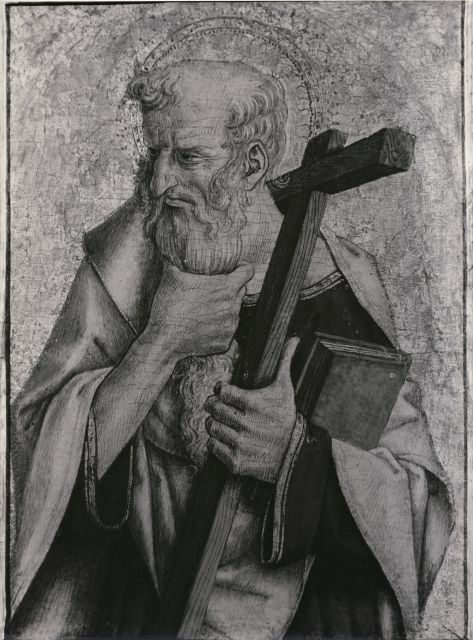
