= Borutta =

Borutta Boruta (Sardinian)
- Comune
- Comune di Borutta
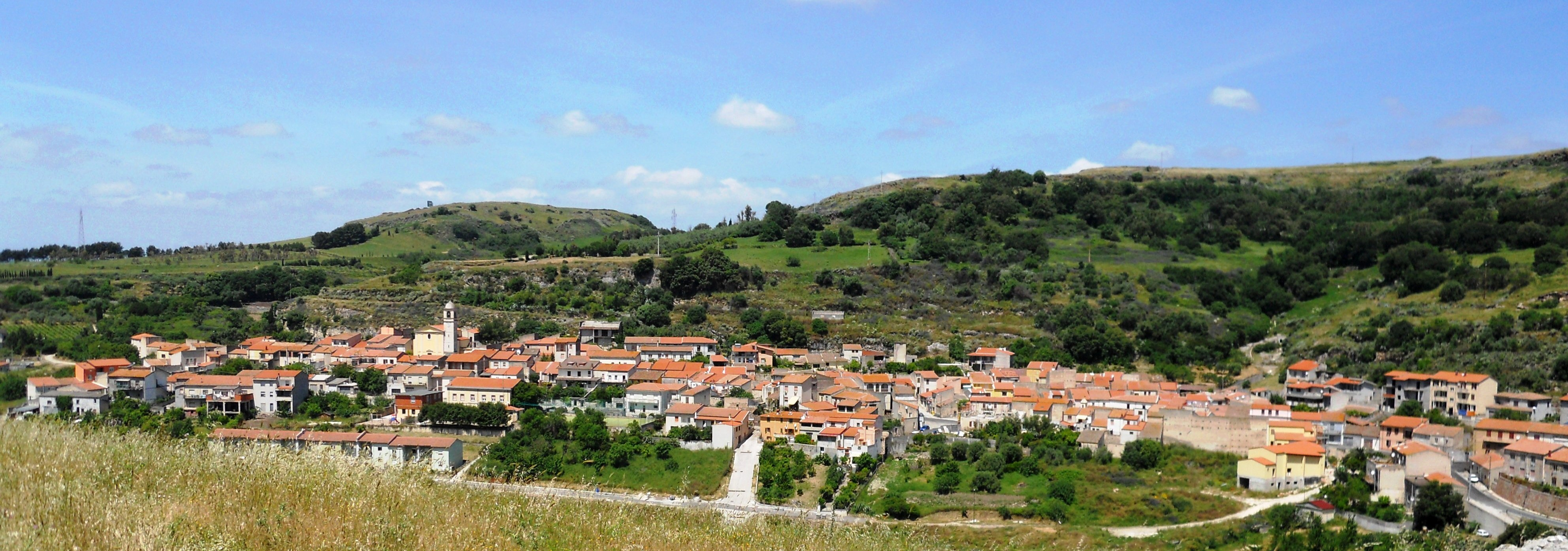
- View of Borutta

- Coat of arms

- Location within Sardinia
- Coordinates: 40°31′N 8°45′E
- Country: Italy
- Region: Sardinia
- Metropolitan city: Sassari (SS)

Government
  - Mayor: Silvano Quirico Salvatore Arru

Area
  - Total: 4.76 km^{2} (1.84 sq mi)
- Elevation: 491 m (1,611 ft)

Population (2026)
  - Total: 244
  - Density: 51.3/km^{2} (133/sq mi)
- Time zone: UTC+1 (CET)
  - Summer (DST): UTC+2 (CEST)
- Postal code: 07040
- Dialing code: 079
- Website: Official website

Borutta (Sardinian: Boruta) is a village and comune (municipality) in the Metropolitan City of Sassari in the autonomous island region of Sardinia in Italy, located about 150 kilometres (93 mi) north of Cagliari and about 30 kilometres (19 mi) southeast of Sassari. It has 244 inhabitants.

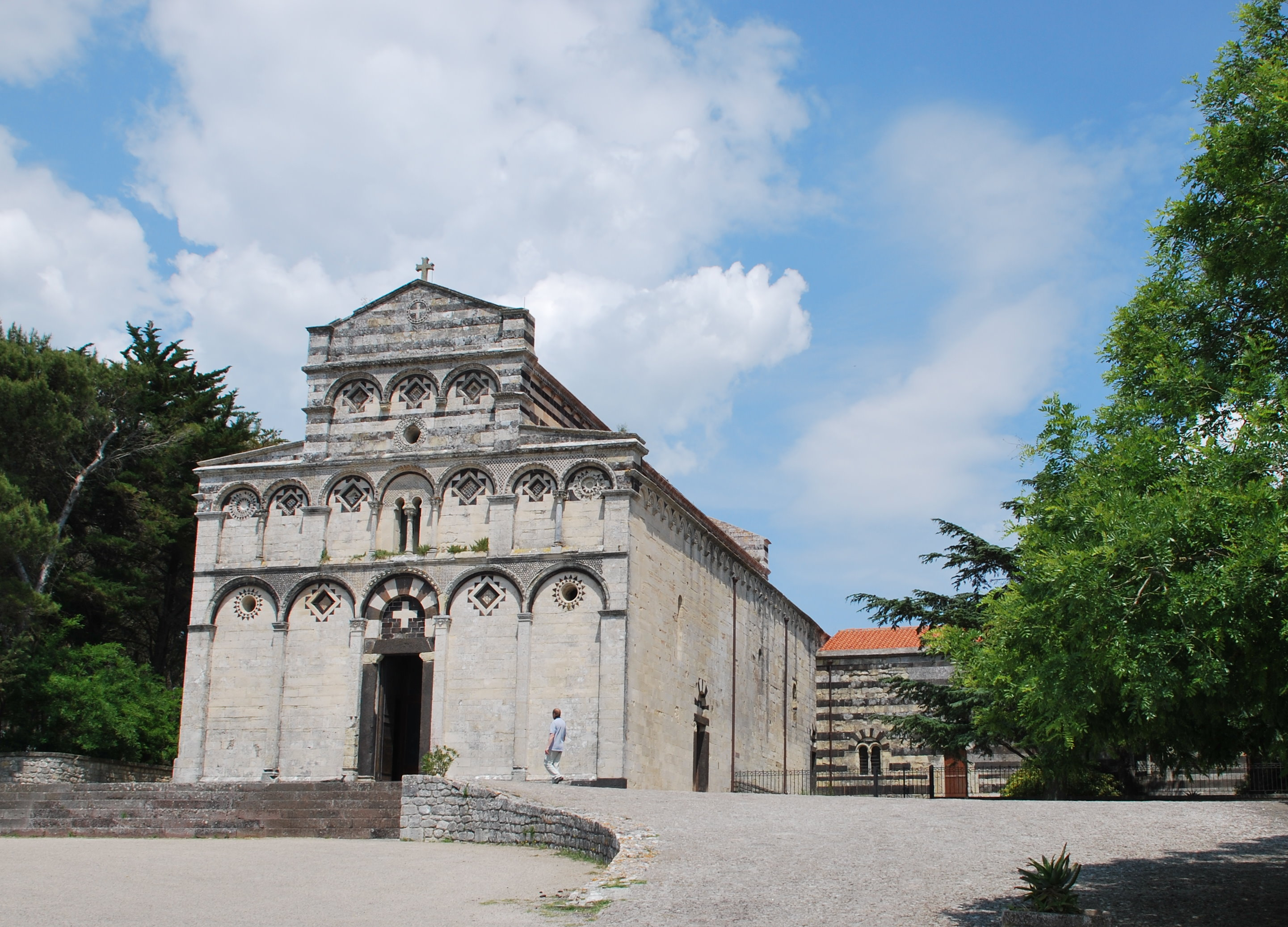
Basilica of San Pietro di Sorres

The volcanic hill once housing the village of Sorres (destroyed by the Aragonese in the early 14th century) houses the Pisan-Romanesque church of San Pietro di Sorres.

Borutta is best known for being the first municipality in Italy to have a woman as its mayor, when Ninetta Bartoli was elected in 1946.

Borutta borders the municipalities of Bessude, Bonnanaro, Cheremule, Thiesi, and Torralba.

== Demographics ==
As of 2026, the population is 244, of which 49.6% are male, and 50.4% are female. Minors make up 5.7% of the population, and seniors make up 37.3%.

Historical population

Year	Pop.	±%
1861	533	—
1871	548	+2.8%
1881	629	+14.8%
1901	689	+9.5%
1911	744	+8.0%
1921	726	−2.4%
1931	655	−9.8%
1936	675	+3.1%

Year	Pop.	±%
1951	649	−3.9%
1961	563	−13.3%
1971	519	−7.8%
1981	446	−14.1%
1991	377	−15.5%
2001	318	−15.6%
2011	285	−10.4%
2021	260	−8.8%

Source: ISTAT

=== Immigration ===
As of 2025, immigrants make up 3.7% of the population. The foreign countries of birth are Romania, Vietnam, Germany, Luxembourg, and Morocco.
