= Electoral firsts in Italy =

This article lists notable electoral firsts in Italy.

== General ==
- First general election with universal suffrage: 1913 (only males), 1946 (both sex);
- First organized political party in the Italian Parliament: Partito Socialista Italiano, 1895;

== Women ==
=== First female Prime Minister of Italy ===
- Giorgia Meloni in 2022

=== First female President of the Italian Chamber of Deputies ===
- Nilde Iotti in 1979

=== First female President of the Italian Senate ===
- Elisabetta Casellati in 2018

=== First female Minister of Foreign Affairs ===
- Emma Bonino in 2013

=== First female Minister of the Interior ===
- Rosa Russo Iervolino in 1998

=== First female Minister of Justice ===
- Paola Severino in 2011

=== First female Minister of Defence ===
- Roberta Pinotti in 2014

=== First female Minister of Economic Development ===
- Federica Guidi in 2014

=== First female Minister of Agriculture ===
- Adriana Poli Bortone in 1994

=== First female Minister of the Environment ===
- Stefania Prestigiacomo in 2008

=== First female Minister of Infrastructure and Transport ===
- Paola De Micheli in 2019

=== First female Minister of Labour and Social Policies ===
- Tina Anselmi in 1976 (also first female Minister in general)

=== First female Minister of Public Education ===
- Franca Falcucci in 1982

=== First female Minister of Culture ===
- Vincenza Bono in 1988

=== First female Minister of Health ===
- Tina Anselmi in 1978

=== First female constable (ufficiale giudiziario) ===
- Maria Luisa Strina in 1964

=== First female mayors ===
- Ninetta Bartoli (Borutta), Ada Natali (Massa Fermana) and Elena Tosetti (Fanano) on 10 March 1946

== Black Italians ==
- Jean-Léonard Touadi, first black deputy in 2008
- Toni Iwobi, first black senator in 2018
- Dacia Valent, first black Italian member of the European Parliament (1989)
- Cécile Kyenge, first black Minister in 2013

== LGBT people ==
- Vladimir Luxuria, first transgender deputy in 2006
