= Fabrizio Cesetti =

Italian politician (born 1957)

Member of the Regional Council of Marche
- In office 22 June 2015 – 27 September 2025

Regional assessor for Budget of Marche
- In office 22 June 2015 – 19 October 2020
- President: Francesco Acquaroli

President of the Province of Fermo
- In office 23 June 2009 – 2 July 2015
- Preceded by: Office established
- Succeeded by: Moira Canigola

Member of the Chamber of Deputies
- In office 23 April 1992 – 29 May 2001

Mayor of Massa Fermana
- In office 20 May 1990 – 24 April 1995
- Preceded by: Lorenzo Procaccini
- Succeeded by: Gilberto Caraceni

Personal details
- Born: 2 March 1957 (age 69) Montegiorgio, Province of Ascoli Piceno, Italy
- Party: Democratic Party of the Left; Democrats of the Left; Democratic Party
- Education: University of Macerata
- Occupation: Lawyer

Fabrizio Cesetti (born 2 March 1957) is an Italian politician of the Democratic Party who served as a member of the Chamber of Deputies from 1992 to 2001. He also served as mayor of Massa Fermana (1990–1995), member of the Regional Council of Marche (2015–2025) and regional assessor for Budget (2015–2020). Cesetti was the first president of the Province of Fermo from 2009 to 2015.
