= Moira Canigola =

Italian politician (born 1966)

President of the Province of Fermo
- In office 19 December 2016 – 19 December 2021
- Preceded by: Fabrizio Cesetti
- Succeeded by: Michele Ortenzi

Mayor of Monte Urano
- In office 26 May 2014 – 9 June 2024
- Preceded by: Francesco Giacinti
- Succeeded by: Andrea Leoni

Personal details
- Born: 12 December 1966 (age 59) Fermo, Province of Ascoli Piceno, Italy
- Party: Democratic Party
- Education: University of Ancona

Moira Canigola (born 12 December 1966) is an Italian politician of the Democratic Party who served as president of the Province of Fermo from 2016 to 2021.

== Life and career ==
Canigola was born in Fermo in 1966. Graduated in Economics from the University of Ancona in 1991, she started working for local cooperatives, before settling in the public administration of the municipality of Monte Urano in 1996.

She entered politics in 2004, being elected to the municipal council of Monte Urano within a centre-left list. She served as an assessor and deputy mayor until 2014, when she was elected mayor of Monte Urano with 60.9% of the vote.

In December 2016, Canigola was elected president of the Province of Fermo, defeating opponent Maria Federica Paoloni, mayor of Magliano di Tenna, with 81% of the vote. Re-elected mayor of Monte Urano in 2019, she failed to be re-confirmed for a third term in 2024.
