= Massa Fermana Altarpiece =

1468 altarpiece by Carlo Crivelli

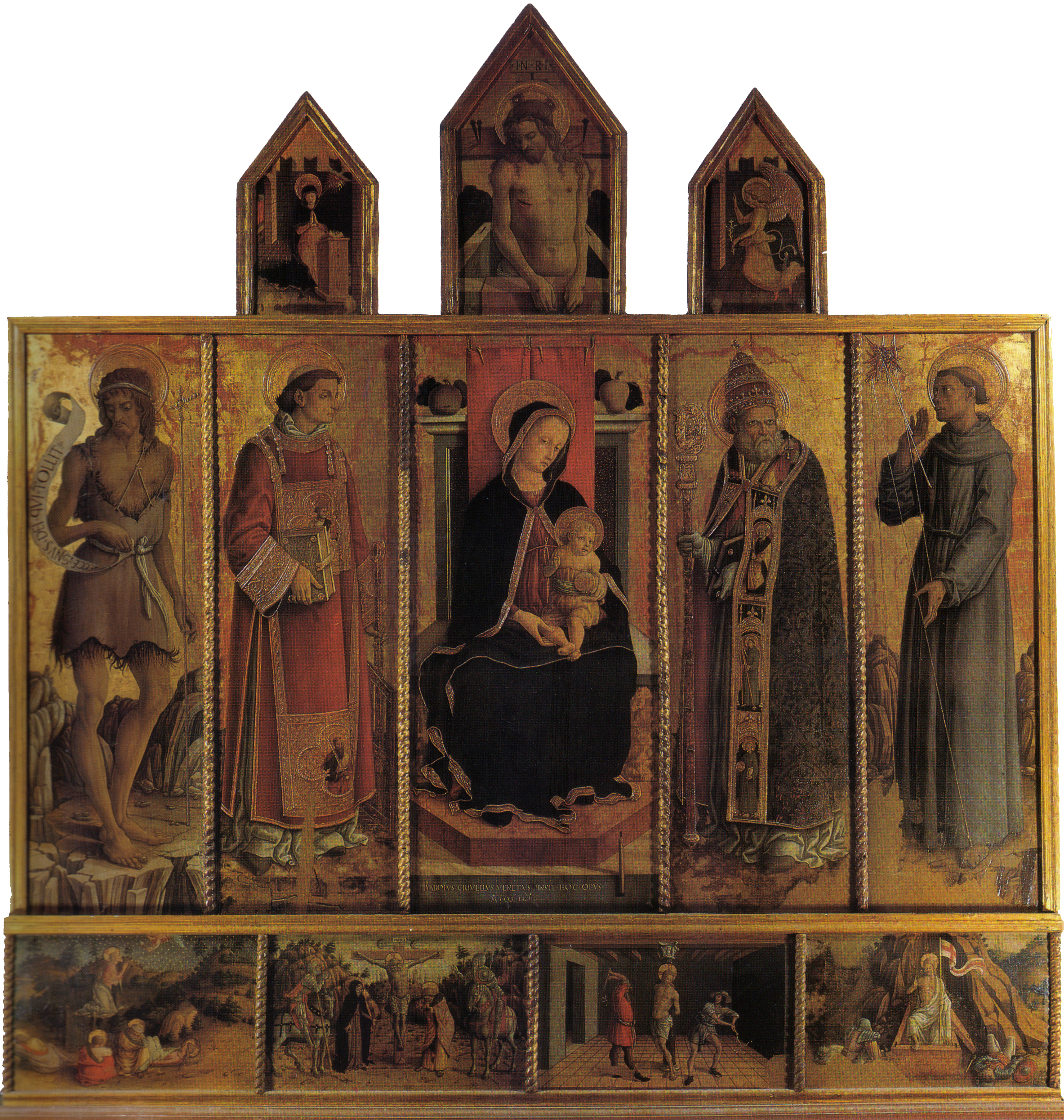
Massa Fermana Altarpiece (1468) by Carlo Crivelli

The Massa Fermana Altarpiece is a 1468 tempera and gold on panel by the Italian painter Carlo Crivelli, held in Santi Lorenzo e Silvestro church in the town of Massa Fermana. It is signed "KAROLVS CRIVELLVS VENETVS PINXIT HOC OPVS MCCCCLXVIII". It is his earliest known surviving work and is notable for dating his return to Italy.

The central register is a Madonna and Child flanked by Saints John the Baptist, Lawrence, Sylvester and Francis. Above this are panels of Mary at the Annunciation, the Pietà and Gabriel at the Annunciation, whilst below is a predella showing Christ at Gethsemane, the Crucifixion, the Flagellation and the Resurrection.

== History ==
Amico Ricci (1834) quotes a local traditions that the work was commission by a count of the Azzolini family from Fermo, who were also lords of Massa Fermana. During the reconnaissance of the works of art wanted by the newly formed Italian government after the Unification of Italy, Cavalcaselle and Crowe saw the polyptych in 1861 in the manse. It was later exhibited in the municipal residence and then in the Galleria Nazionale delle Marche in Urbino, where it remained until the end of the Second World War, after which it returned to the church of origin.

== Description and style ==
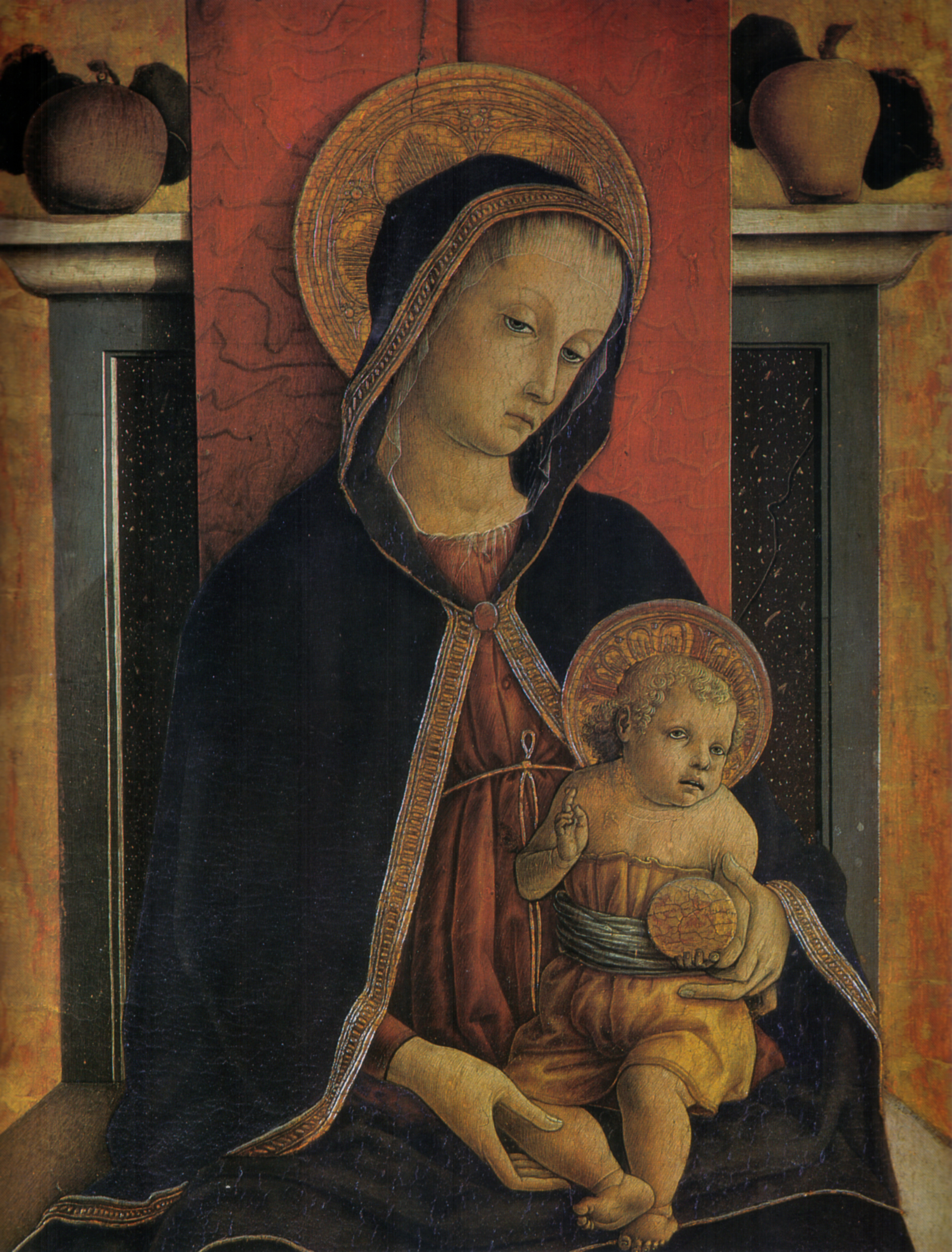
Madonna and Child (detail))

The polyptych is composed of five main panels with the Madonna and Child in the center (105x44 cm) and on the sides the saints John the Baptist, Lawrence, Sylvester and Francis (105x44cm each). The panels with the Annunciation and Gabriel at the Annunciation measure 37x19 cm each, and the Pietà measures 51x28 cm. In the four compartments of the predella, the Crucifixion precedes the Flagellation, a reversal of the usual order.

=== The Madonna ===
The Madonna is seated on a throne in the center and holds in her arms the Child who blesses and holds a golden sphere, symbol of the terrestrial globe. The marble throne rests on a pedestal, in which an extinguished candle is embedded, close to the artist's signature. At the top it is refined by the red cloth that covers the backrest and by two large cranes resting on the sides, a peach and a quince, alluding to the Original Sin. The halos, of Mary and of the saints, are of an archaic type, like golden discs pinned to the back of the head and not foreshortened, on which the artist applied decorations in relief.

The Madonna recalls the schemes of Filippo Lippi. Compared to the Madonnas of the Paduan or Zadar period (e.g., theHuldschinsky Madonna), the figure of the Virgin is here softened by a new tenderness, which will later be found in the artist's mature works.

=== Flanking saints ===
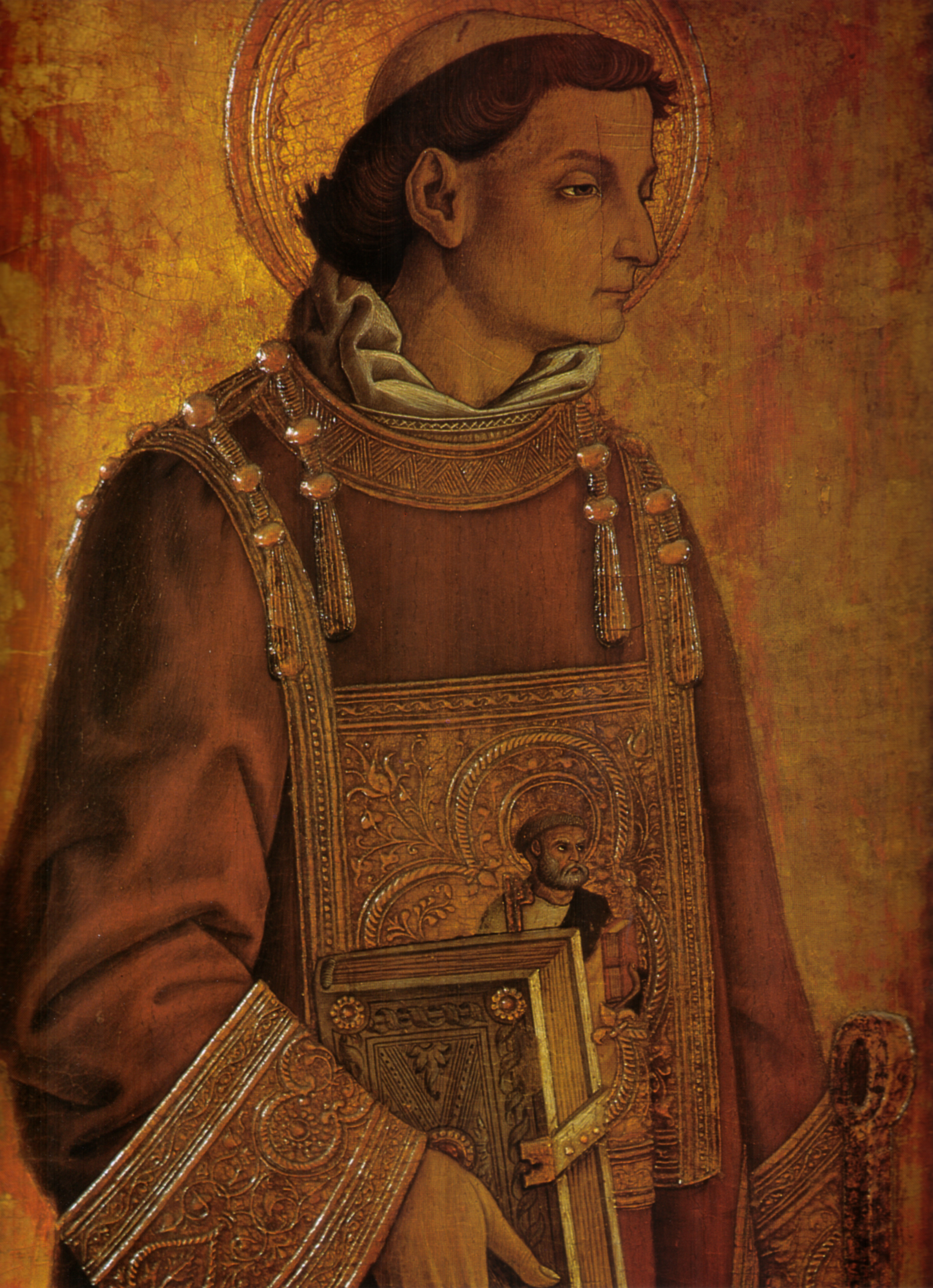
Saint Lawrence (detail)

The lower step unifies the compartments of the saints, but is differentiated according to the setting. For example, John the Baptist is imagined in the desert, resting on a jagged rock in the style of Mantegna, which is also found symmetrically in the rightmost panel, of Saint Francis receiving the stigmata, while the other two saints rest on a step of mottled marble.

Varying in pose and attitude, the saints are recognizable by typical attributes (the scroll with John's Ecce Agnus Dei, Lorenzo's grill and the crucifix with golden rays – in relief – touching Francis' wounds), with the exclusion of Sylvester, who has no specific attributes apart from the sumptuous papal robe, but who is nevertheless recognizable as the titular saint (with Lorenzo) of the church.

Conceived in a drier and more sculptural manner than the Madonna, the saints show a greater persistence of the Paduan Renaissance style.

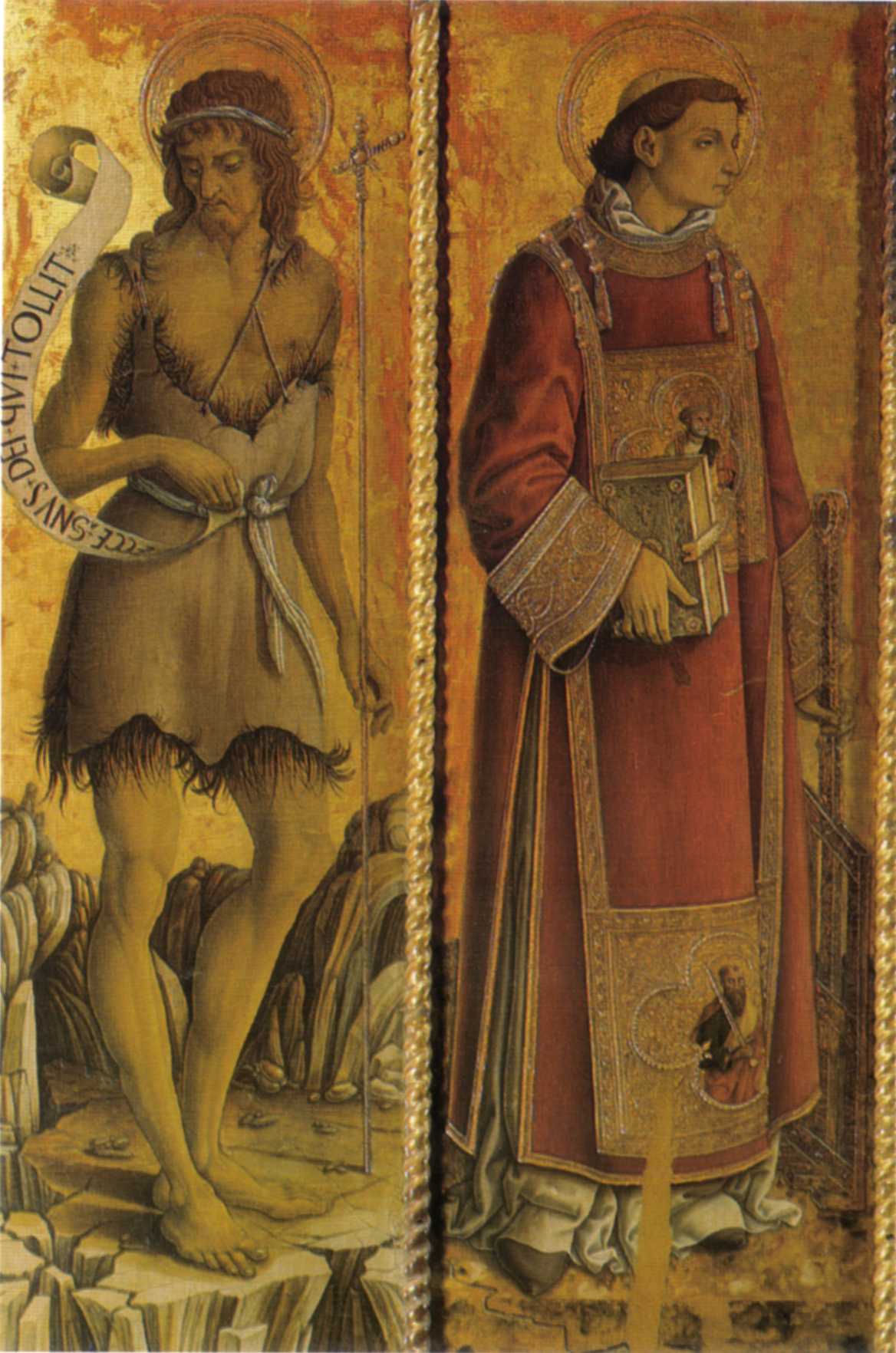
Saint John the Baptist and Saint Lawrence

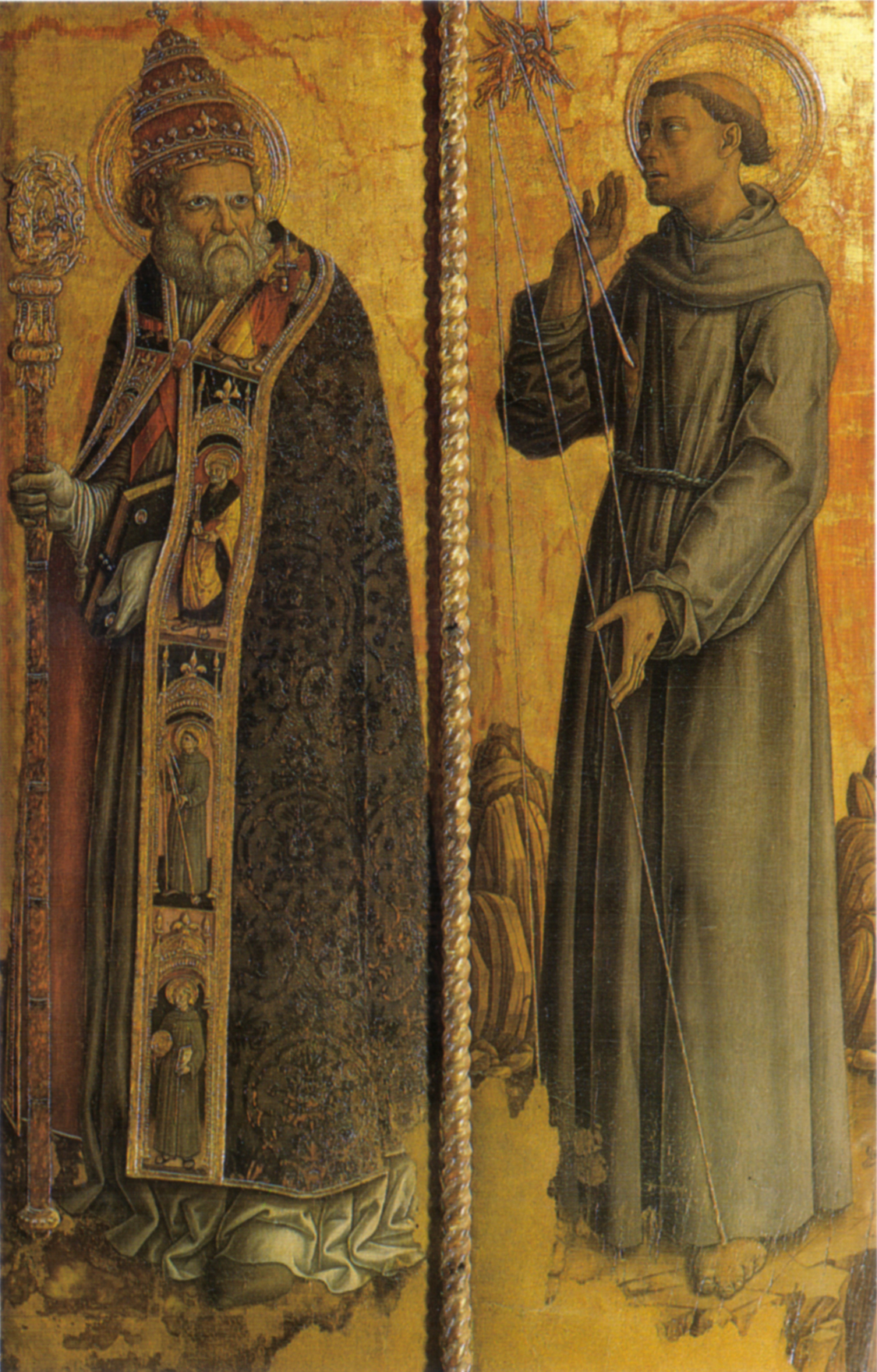
Saint Sylvester and Saint Francis

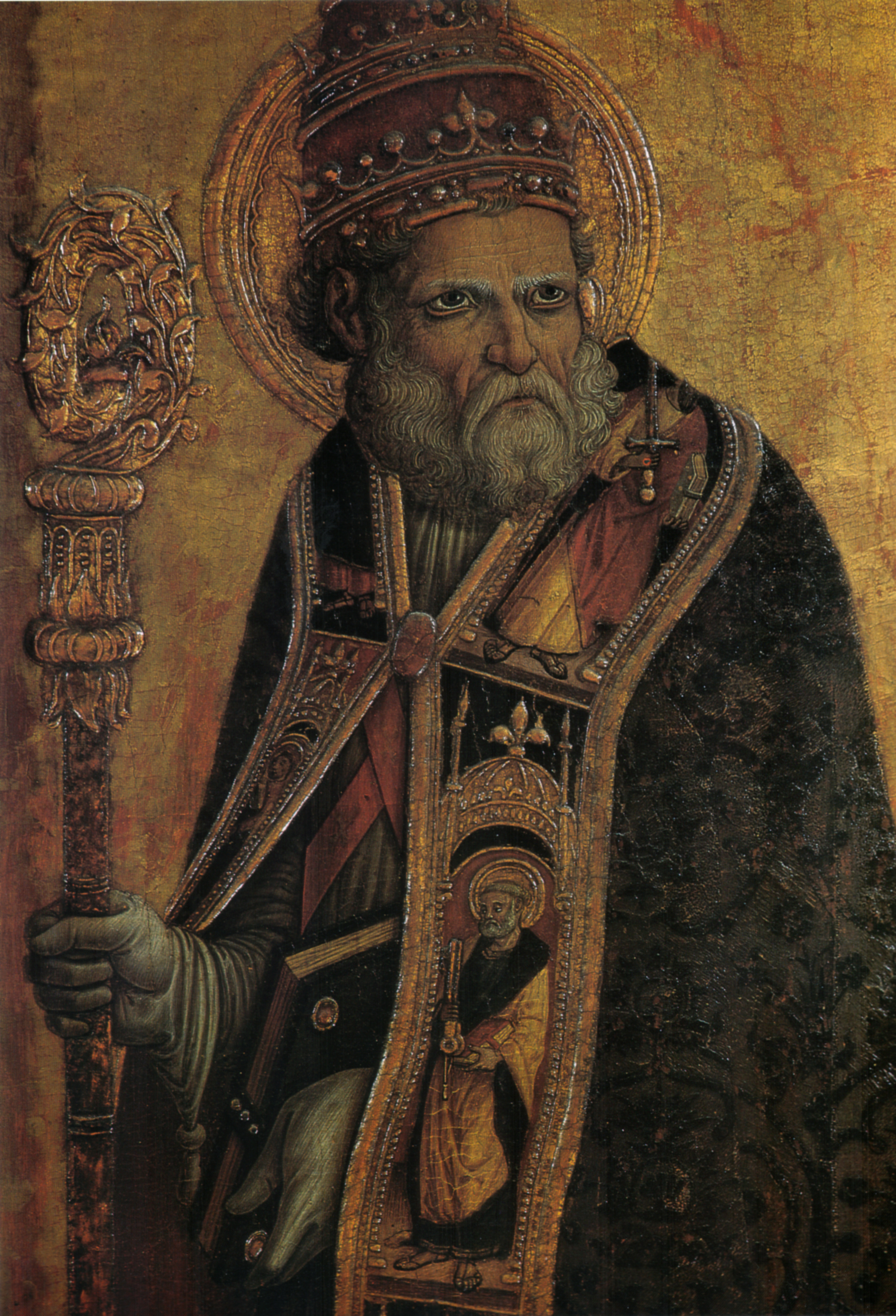
Saint Sylvester (detail)

=== Upper panels ===
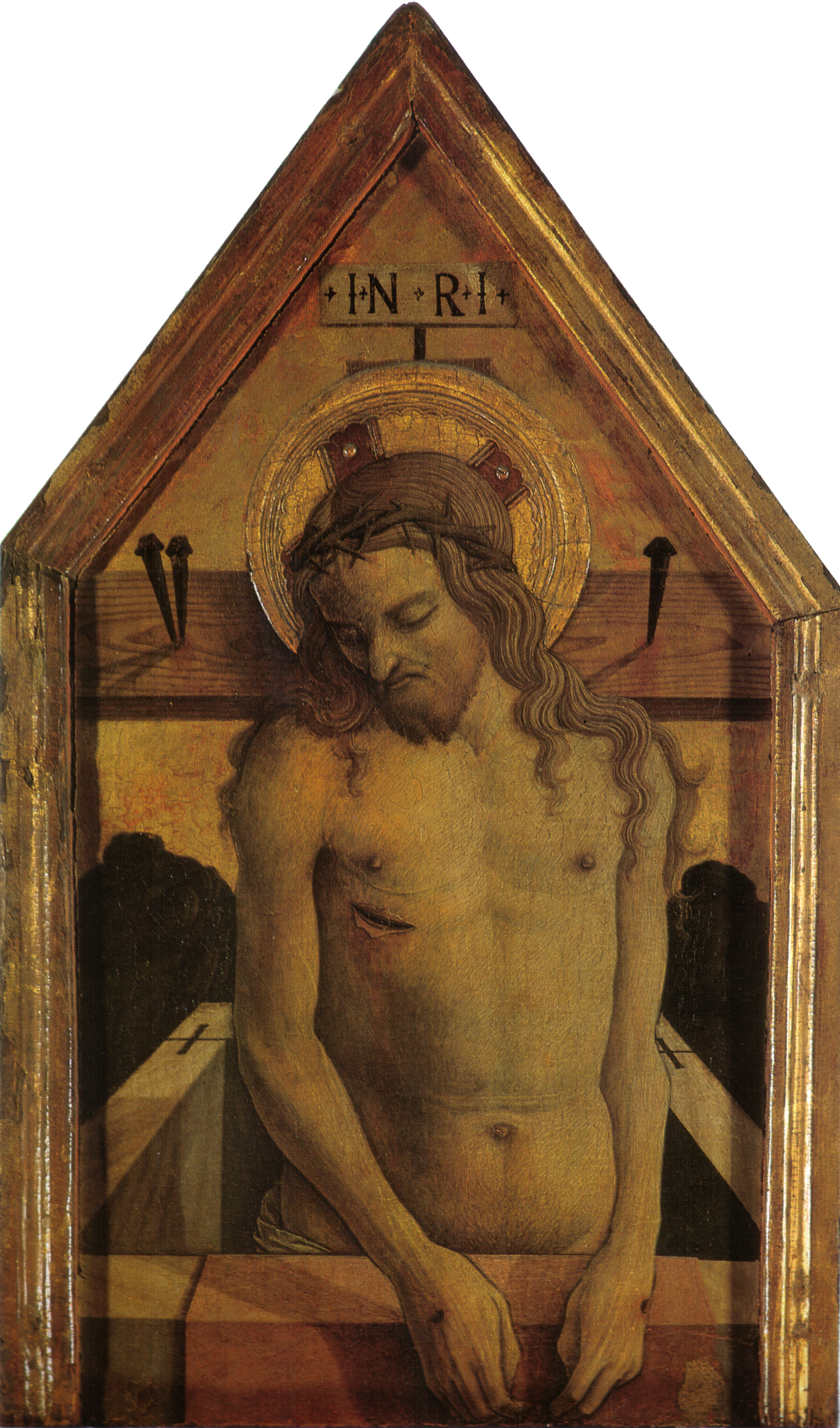
La Pietà

The original wooden frame which was to incorporate the upper panels in a more elegant way is lost.

These three scenes are also spatially united, but only the side panels of the Annunciation, which have the same background with a crenellated wall. On the right the angel glides delicately with his wings and the fluttering cords of his robe and pad in relief; on the left Mary, sitting in front of the lectern, receives the visit of the dove of the Holy Spirit and accepts her destiny by humbly clasping her hands, while on the left there is a delicate glimpse of her bedroom, untouched as befits a virgin. These two small scenes represent a real exercise in perspective, with the grid represented in the blocks of the floor and in the progression of the joints between the brick walls. The Virgin's lectern itself is violently shortened. The type of the Madonna is influenced by Bartolomeo Vivarini, already known to the artist in Venice and also active in the Marche in those years.

The Pietà has a sparse rocky landscape as its backdrop. The body of Christ stands at the same time heroic in its strong plastic physicality, and painful for the suffering of martyrdom, remembered not only by the grimace, but also by the cross that appears behind him with the three nails driven into the wood. A sarcophagus is made visible by the tilted perspective of Jesus' body. Pietà makes use of a light source, as evinced by the shadow Jesus casts in the lower third of the frame, and the shadow cast by the nails in the upper third.

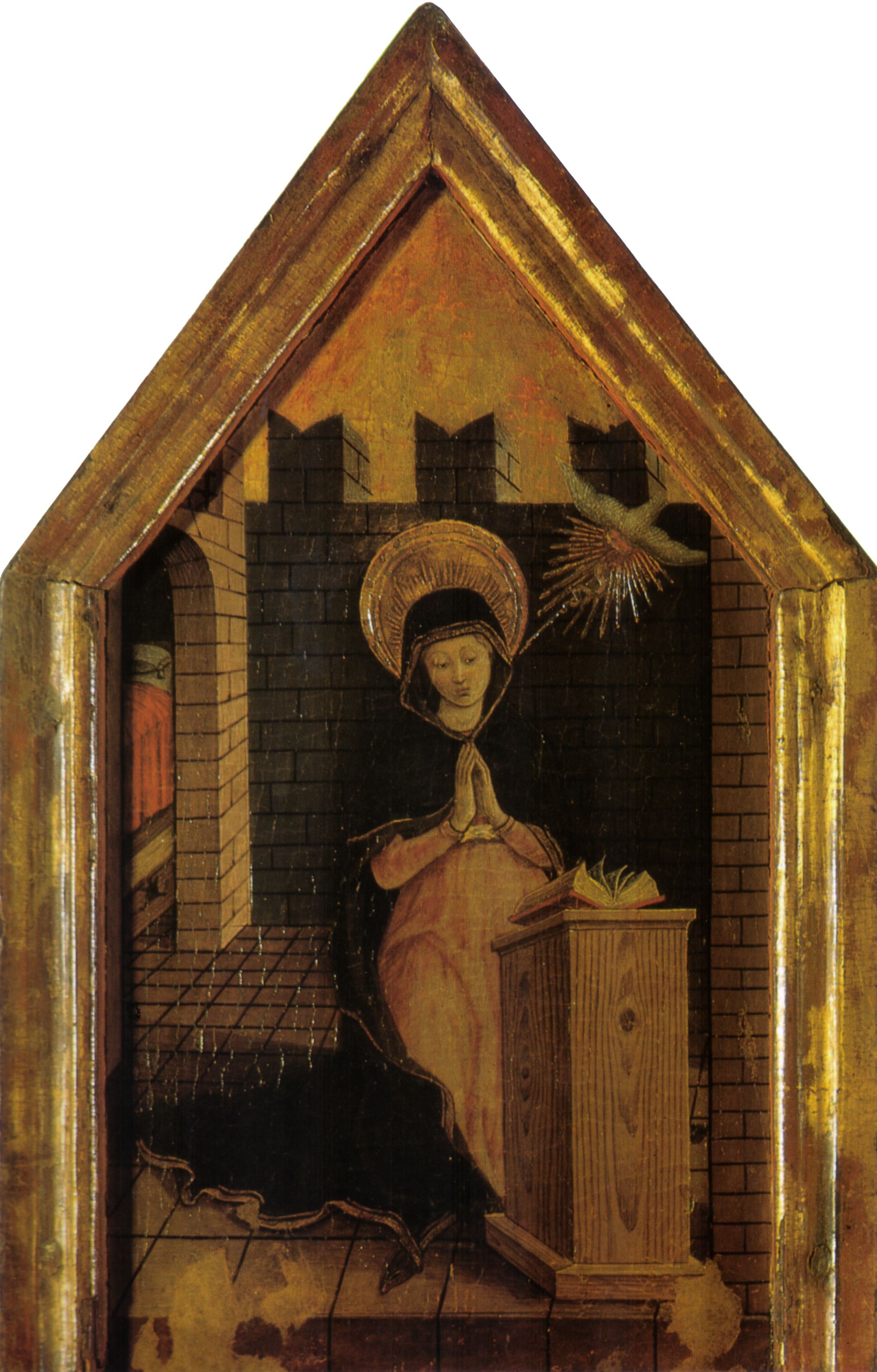
Annunciation

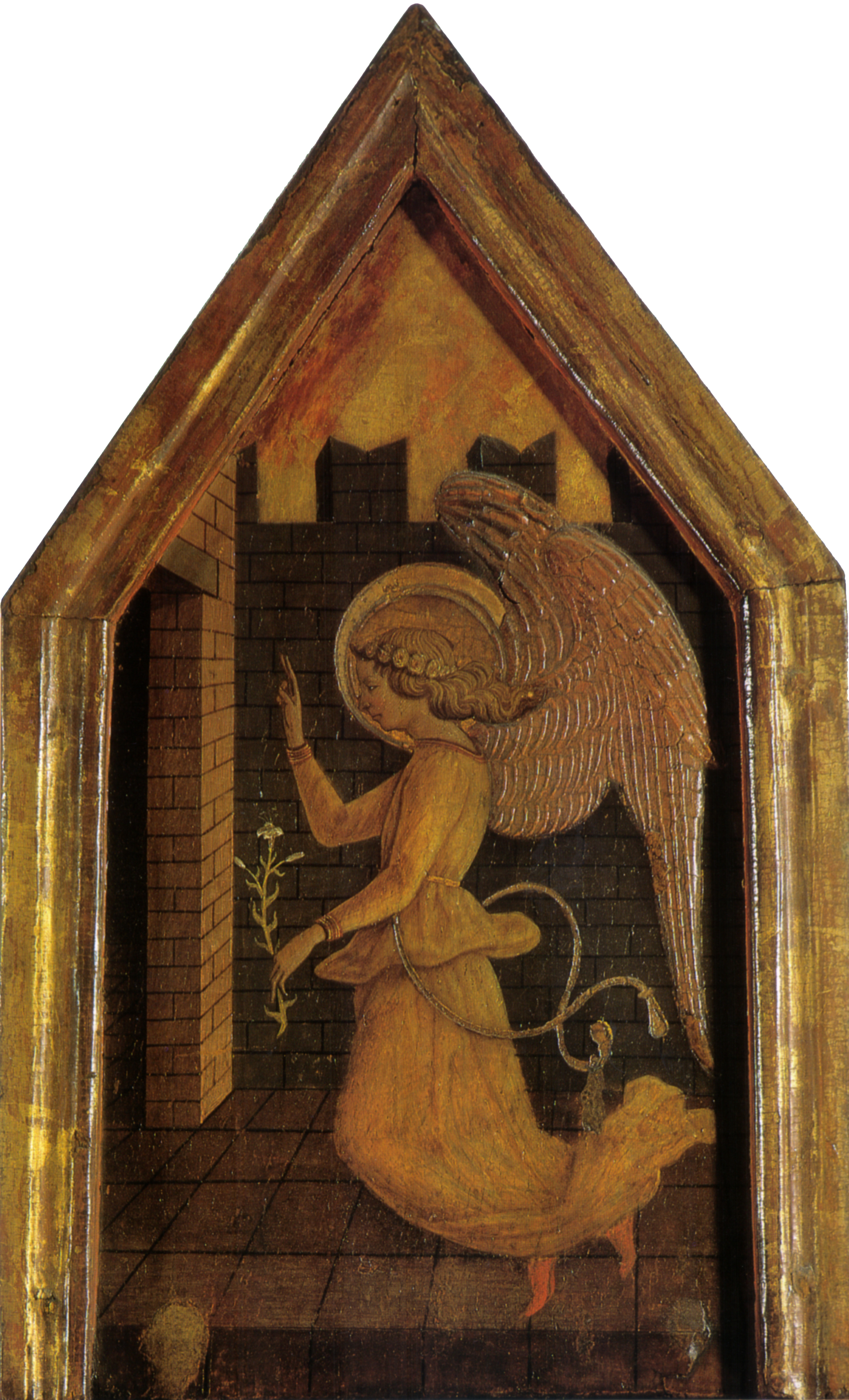
Angel of the Annunciation

=== Predella ===
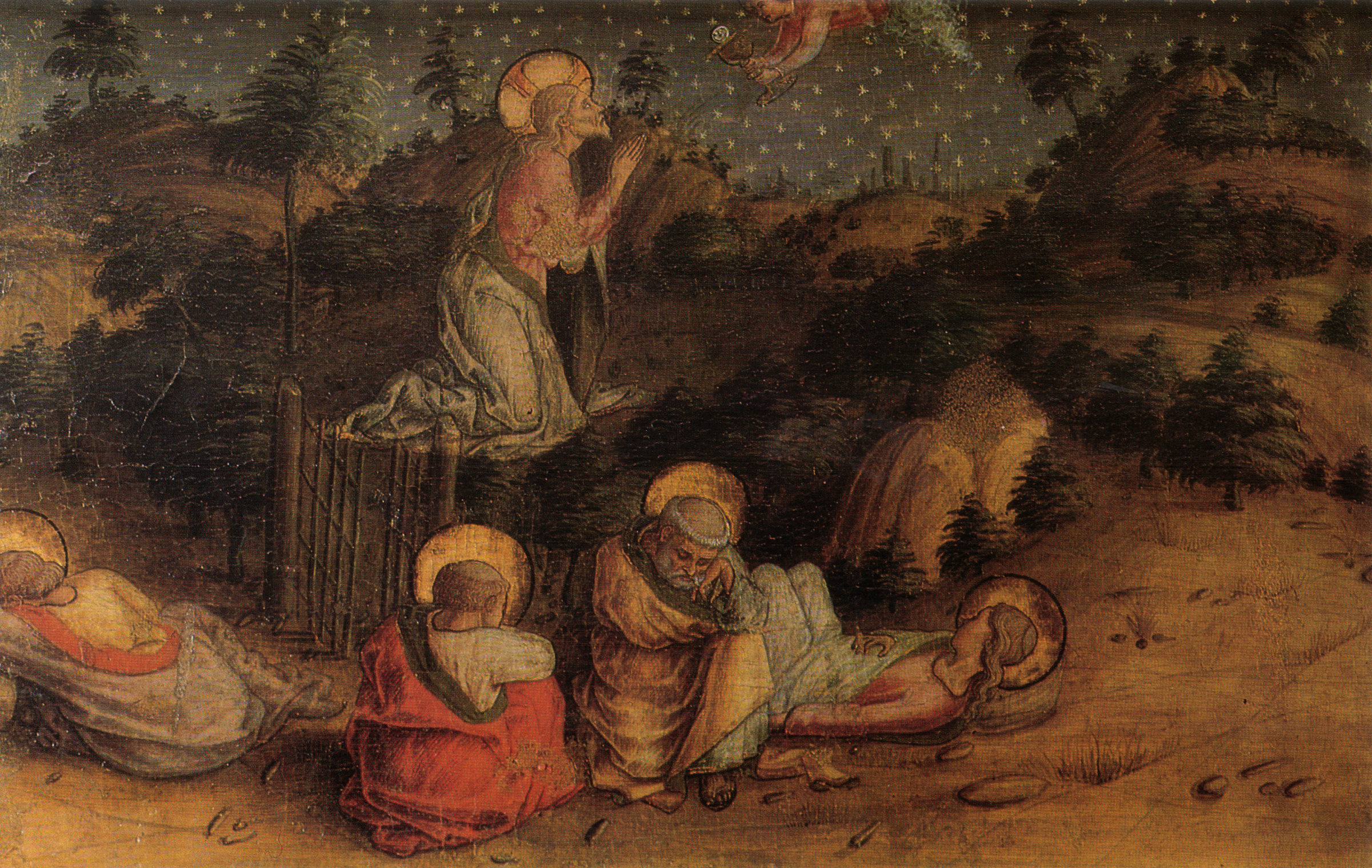
Prayer in the Garden

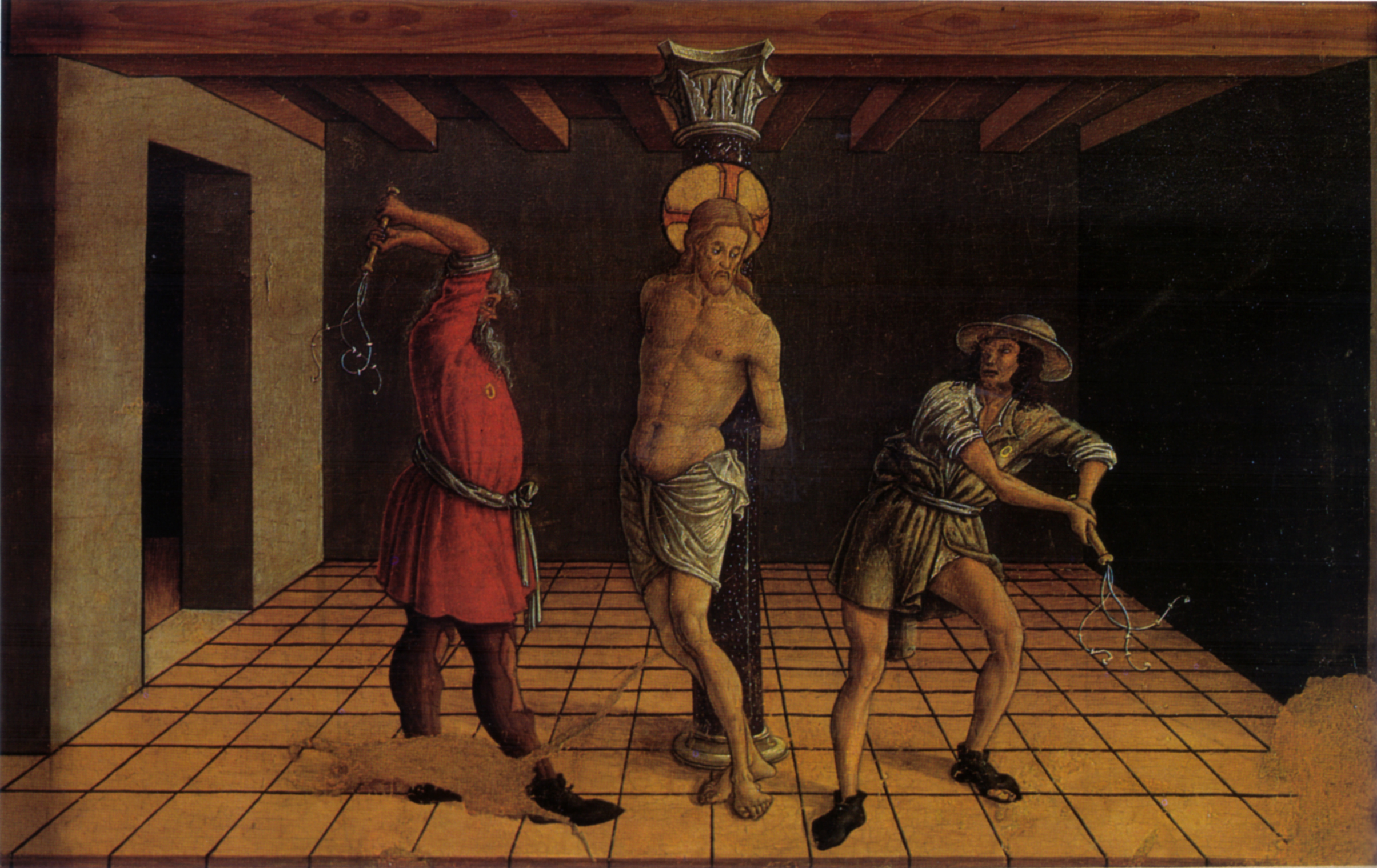
Flagellation

The predella shows narrative scenes, rare in the artist's production. The inspiration from Mantegna's San Zeno Altarpiece is evident for the scenes (excluding the Flagellation), attempting to convey the drama of the events even more, as can be seen clearly in the Crucifixion where the elderly Mary is transfigured by a grimace of pain. The soldier lying foreshortened in the Resurrection is an explicit quotation of the Transport of Saint Christopher frescoed in the Ovetari Chapel in Padua. The Flagellation instead would refer to the perspective solutions of Paolo Uccello who worked in Urbino in that year, in particular the scenes of the Miracle of the Profaned Host.

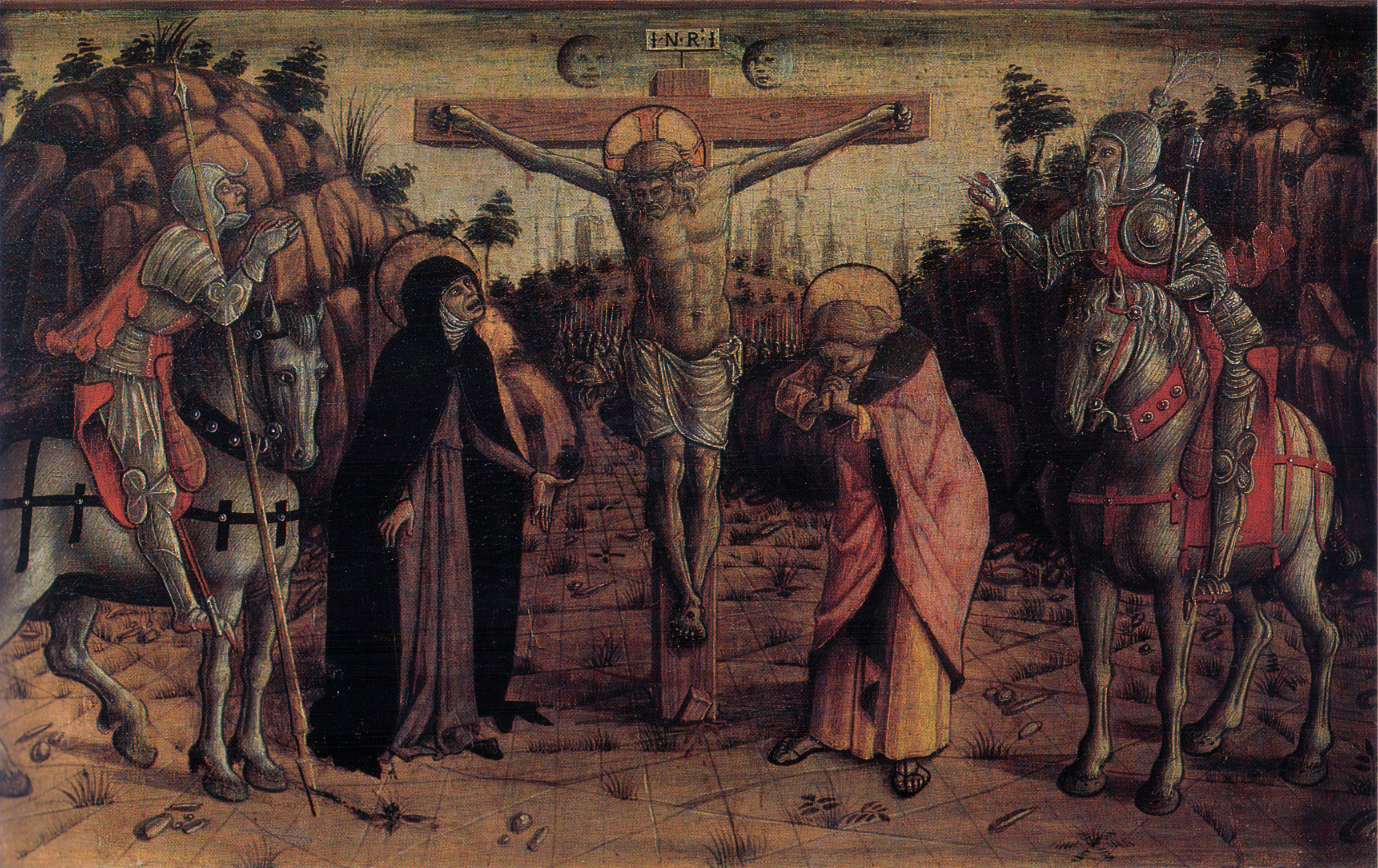
Crucifixion

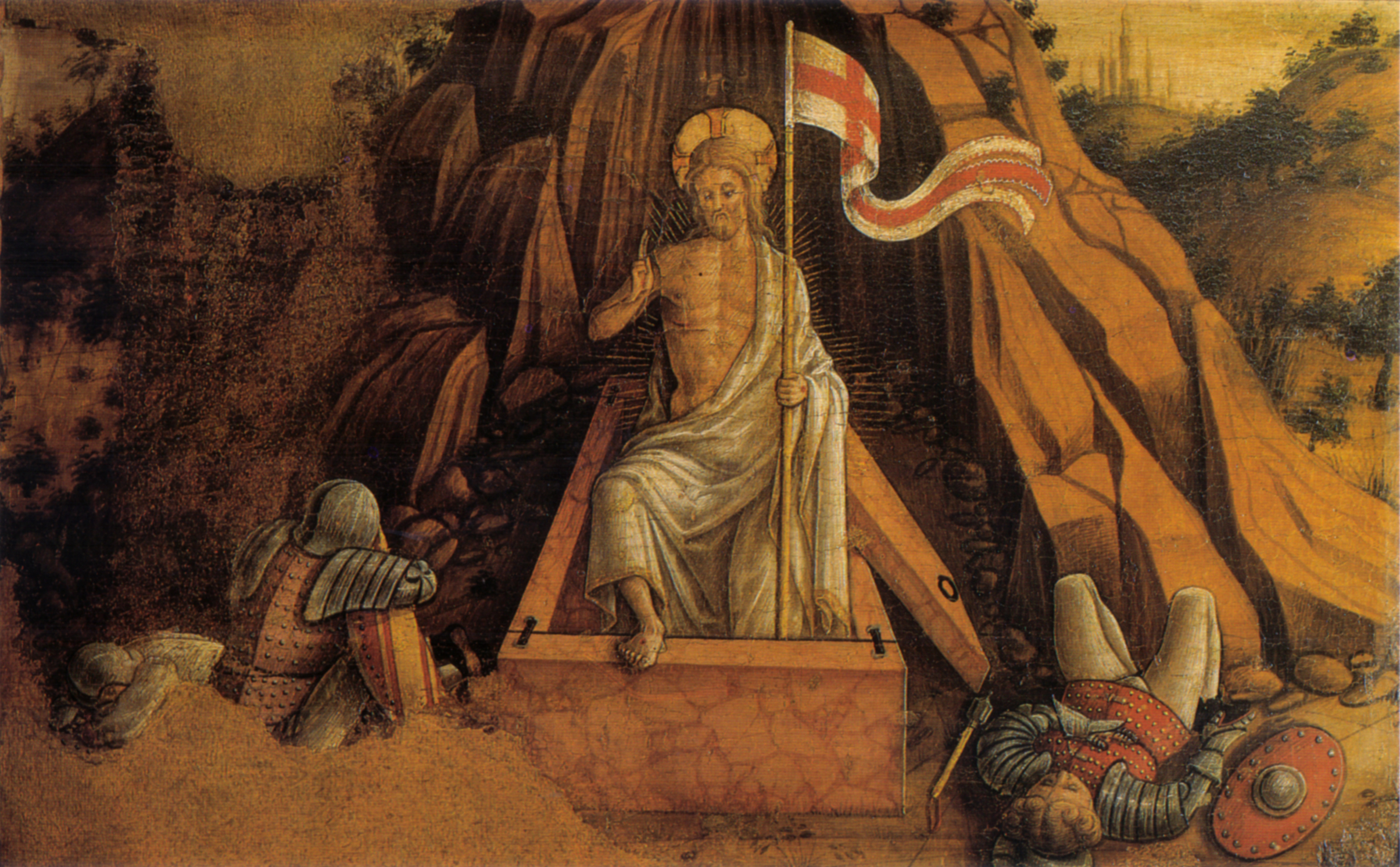
Resurrection
