= List of presidents of the Province of Fermo =

President of the Province of Fermo
- Presidente della Provincia di Fermo
- Incumbent; Michele Ortenzi since 19 December 2021
- Term length: 4 years
- Inaugural holder: Fabrizio Cesetti
- Formation: 2009

The president of the Province of Fermo is the head of the provincial government in Fermo, Marche, Italy. The president oversees the administration of the province, coordinates the activities of the municipalities, and represents the province in regional and national matters.

Since December 2021, the office has been held by Michele Ortenzi, a centre-right independent.

== History ==
The Province of Fermo was established in 2004, after being separated from the Province of Ascoli Piceno. In its initial phase, the new province was administered by a government-appointed extraordinary commissioner, Michele De Feis, pending the organisation of its institutional bodies. Following the 2009 elections, Fabrizio Cesetti took office as the first president of the province, marking the beginning of the province's ordinary democratic administration. The president was directly elected by the citizens for a five-year term and was responsible for appointing and dismissing the members of the Provincial Executive.

Following the 2014 Delrio Law, the president is elected by an assembly composed of the mayors and municipal councillors of the municipalities within the province. The president serves a four-year term and acts as the legal representative of the province, presiding over the Provincial Council and the Provincial Assembly of Mayors.

== List ==
Nº	Portrait	Name	Term of office		Party	Election
Nº	Portrait	Name	Start	End	Party	Election
–		Michele De Feis (Prefectural commissioner)	13 December 2004	23 June 2009	—	
1		Fabrizio Cesetti	23 June 2009	13 October 2014	Democratic Party	2009
1		Fabrizio Cesetti	13 October 2014	2 July 2015	Democratic Party	2014
–		Aronne Perugini (Acting vice-president)	2 July 2015	19 December 2016	Civic list	2014
2		Moira Canigola	19 December 2016	19 December 2021	Democratic Party	2016
3		Michele Ortenzi	19 December 2021	16 March 2026	Independent (centre-right)	2021
3		Michele Ortenzi	16 March 2026	Incumbent	Independent (centre-right)	2026

== Sources ==
- "Storia amministrativa dell'ente". Ministero dell'Interno.
