= Ninetta Bartoli =

First woman mayor in Italy (1896–1978)

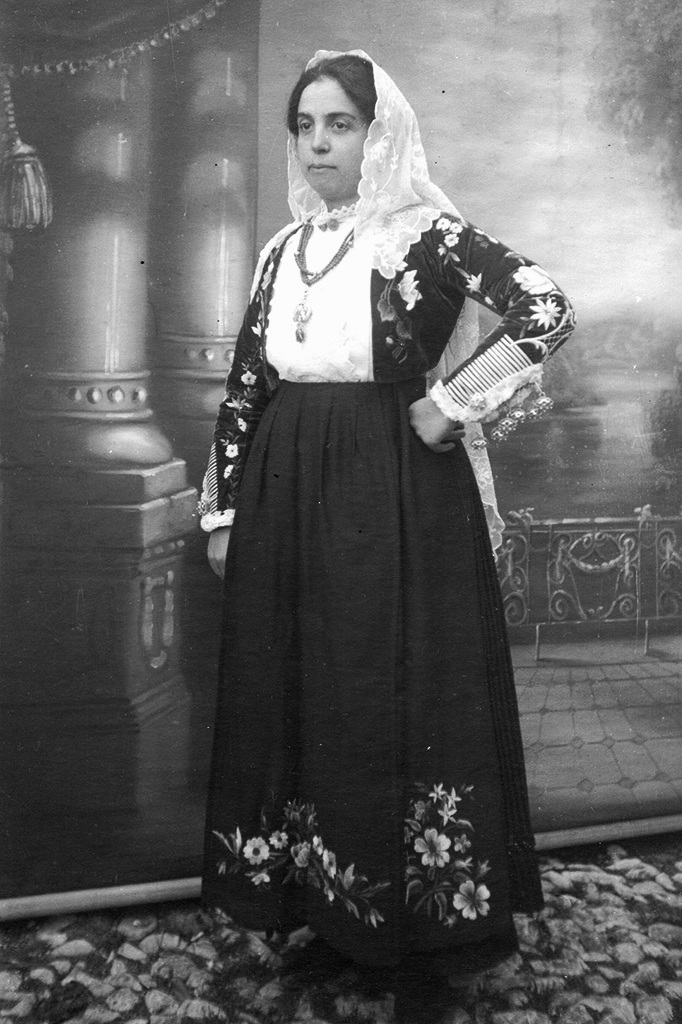
- Official portrait taken on Bartoli's first day as a mayor, 1946; she is dressed in a Sardinian traditional costume used for ceremonial purposes.

Mayor of Borutta
- In office 10 March 1946 – 1958

Personal details
- Born: Antonia Bartoli; 24 September 1896 Borutta, Sardinia, Kingdom of Italy
- Died: 30 November 1978 (aged 82) Borutta, Sardinia, Italy
- Resting place: Borutta cemetery
- Party: Christian Democracy (DC)
- Education: "Figlie di Maria" Institute, Sassari
- Occupation: Politician
- Known for: First woman mayor in Italy

Antonia "Ninetta" Bartoli (24 September 1896 – 30 November 1978) was an Italian politician. She became one of the first women mayors in Italy when she was elected in her native town of Borutta, Sardinia, in 1946.

== Life and career ==
Born into a noble family in the small town of Borutta, in the Meilogu historical region of Sardinia, Ninetta Bartoli was educated at the prestigious "Figlie di Maria" Institute of Sassari. Contrarily to her sister, who got married and left their hometown, Bartoli remained single and became more closely involved with the local Catholic community, after meeting missionary Giovanni Battista Manzella.

During the Fascist regime, Bartoli was socially engaged in her parish, and actively opposed gender inequalities. In 1945, when Fascism fell and opposition parties were legalized, she assumed the role of the secretary for the local section of the Christian Democracy party (DC). The following year, after women were legally allowed to be electoral candidates, she successfully ran for mayor of Borutta with the support of the most prominent DC members in the province – most notably the Segni family, whose member Antonio Segni would go on to be elected President of the Italian Republic; Bartoli was friends with his wife Laura Carta. She won the municipal election with 332 votes out of a total of 371, corresponding to a rate of 89%. She was re-elected twice and remained in office until 1958, when she lost the support of younger DC members, who had replaced many of the older politicians.

Bartoli's tenure as mayor was characterized by the realization of extensive building projects in Borutta, including the first public housing complex, the kindergarten and elementary school, a cemetery, the municipal building, the aqueduct, the sewage system and the electrical grid. She established dairy and agricultural cooperatives, a retirement home, and promoted several projects for the improvement of women's condition and their employment as qualified professionals. She invested part of her personal fortune in the restoration of the San Pietro di Sorres monastery, where in 1955 a community of Benedictine monks was founded, which was the first in centuries in Sardinia.

Bartoli died in Borutta in late 1978; her body was displayed at the municipal building before being buried in the local cemetery. In her honour, the municipality created an award for women who made significant contributions in the social, political or economical field of their community; a public square was also named after her.

== See also ==
- Sardinians
- List of first women mayors
- Electoral firsts in Italy
