= Michele Ortenzi =

Italian politician (born 1974)

President of the Province of Fermo
- Incumbent
- Assumed office 19 December 2021
- Preceded by: Moira Canigola

Mayor of Montegiorgio
- Incumbent
- Assumed office 11 June 2018
- Preceded by: Armando Benedetti

Personal details
- Born: 9 May 1974 (age 52) Montegiorgio, Marche, Italy

Michele Ortenzi (born 9 May 1974) is an Italian politician serving as president of the Province of Fermo since 2021. He has served as mayor of Montegiorgio since 2018.

In December 2021, Ortenzi was elected president of the Province of Fermo for the centre-right coalition, defeating Mauro Ferranti, mayor of Montappone, with 52,331 weighted votes to 37,864. He was re-elected for a second term in March 2026.
