= Nuraghe Santu Antine =

Ancient megalithic edifice in Sardinia

Coordinates: 40.4865°N 8.7698°E

- Sa domo de su re
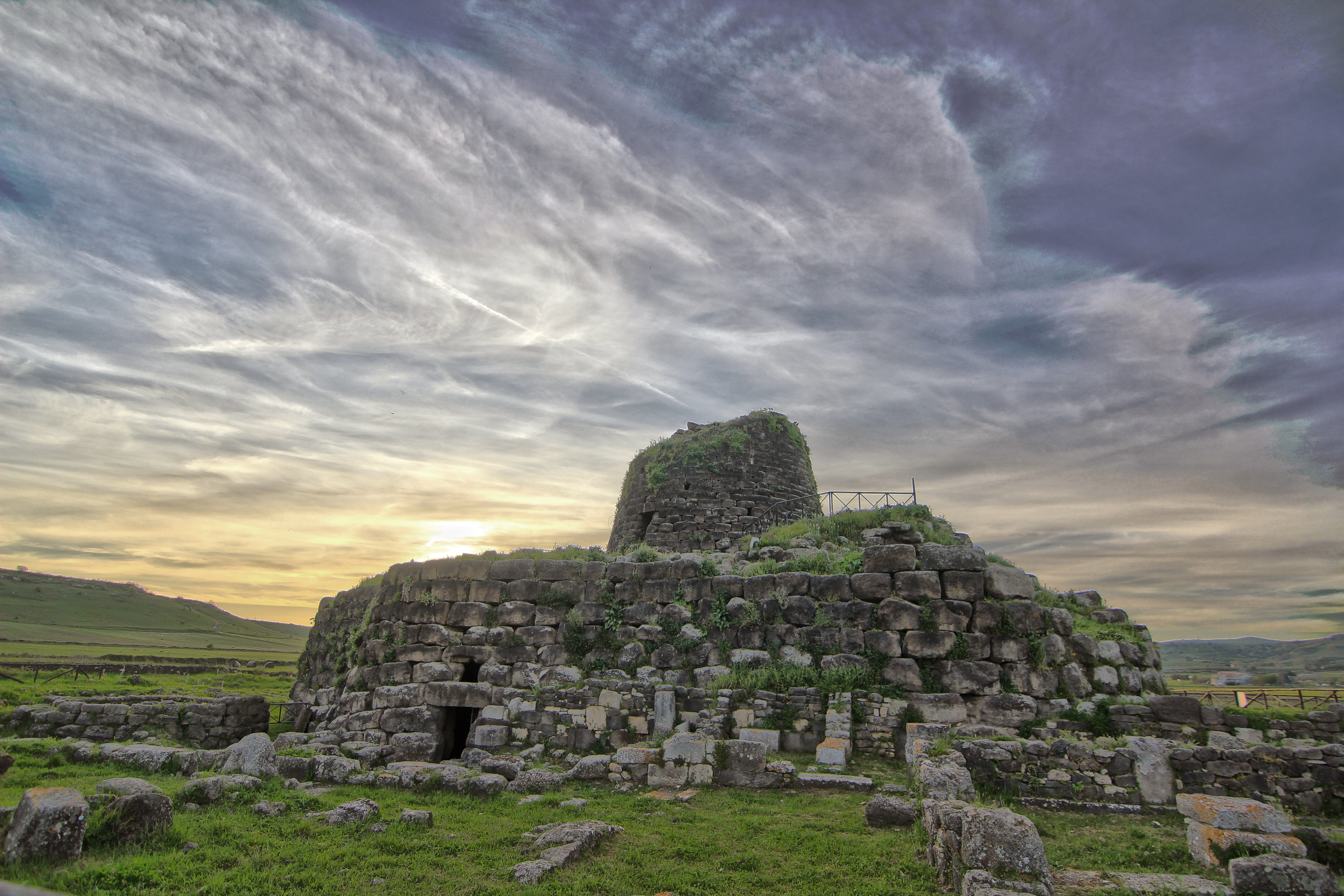
- Interactive map of Nuraghe Santu Antine
- Type: Village
- Periods: Bronze Age
- Cultures: Nuragic civilization
- Location: Torralba, Sardinia, Italy

Santu Antine ("Saint Constantine"), also known as Sa domo de su re ("The house of the king" in the Sardinian language) is a nuraghe (ancient megalithic edifice built by the Nuragic Civilization) in Torralba, one of the largest in Sardinia. It is located in the centre of the Cabu Abbas plain.

== Description ==
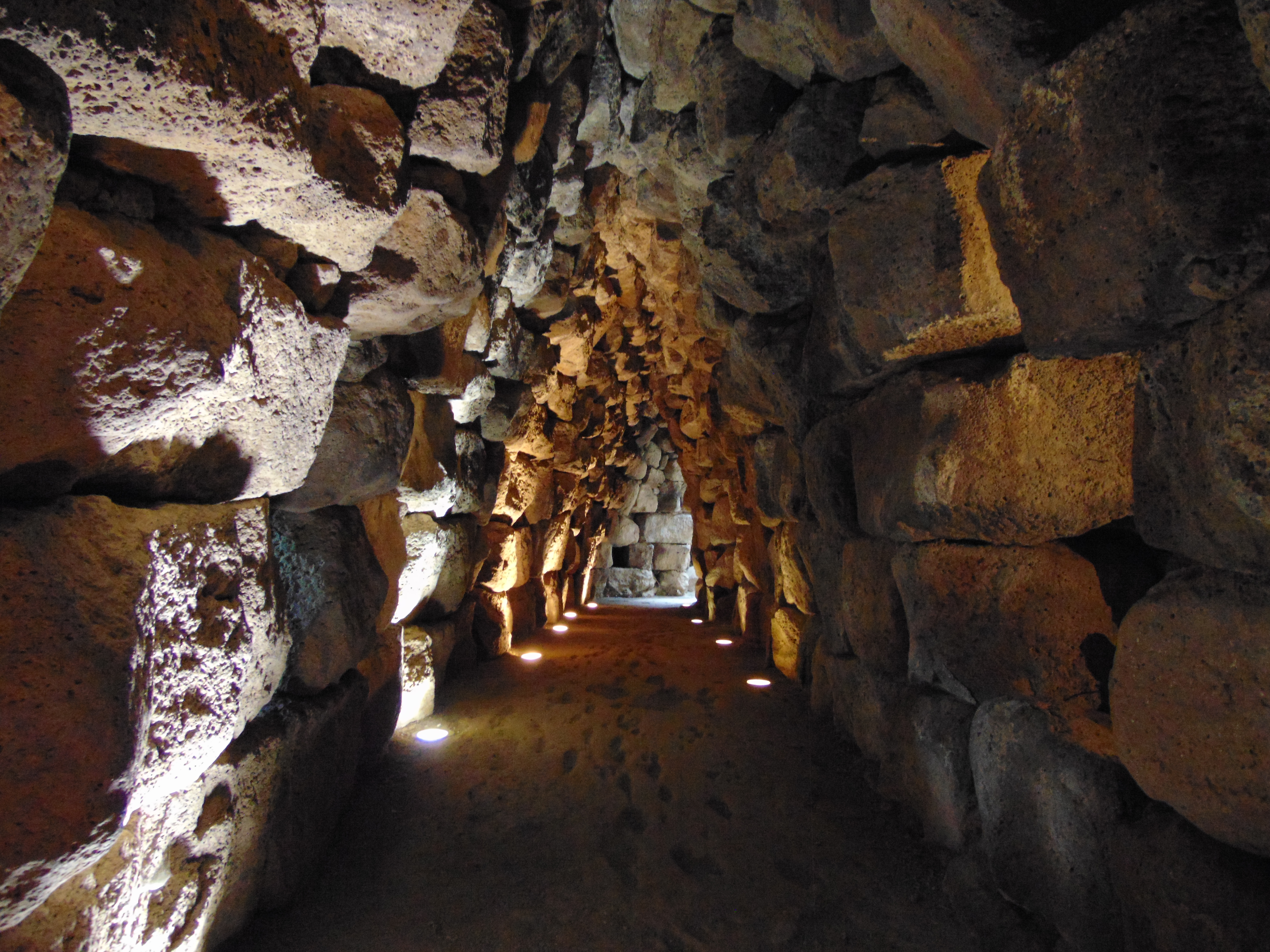
Corridor

Santu Antine is constructed of huge basalt blocks. The main tower originally reached a height of 23–24 metres (75–80 ft) and contains three tholoi chambers on top of each other. The central tower with diameter of 15 metres (50 ft) is 17 metres (55 ft) high. It has three floors. The top floor is now gone. Multiple 27 metres (90 ft) long corridors built with the corbel arch technique can be observed inside of the Nuraghe, superimposed on two floors. In addition to the towers, the nuraghe featured three wells.

The main structure was built around the 19-18th century BC, and the other parts of the nuraghe date back to the 17th–15th century BC. The remains of a Nuragic village lie nearby.

== Archaeological and archaeoastronomical studies ==
The nuraghe has been studied several times from an archaeoastronomic point of view, and these studies have shown how its structure is oriented following the solstices. These claims were supported, among others, by the archaeologist Ercole Contu and archaeostronomists Mauro Peppino Zedda, Juan Antonio Belmonte and Michael Hoskin. In particular, Hoskin, science historian and emeritus professor at Churchill College in Cambridge, called Santu Antine "the most sophisticated dry stone monument on earth's surface".

== Gallery ==
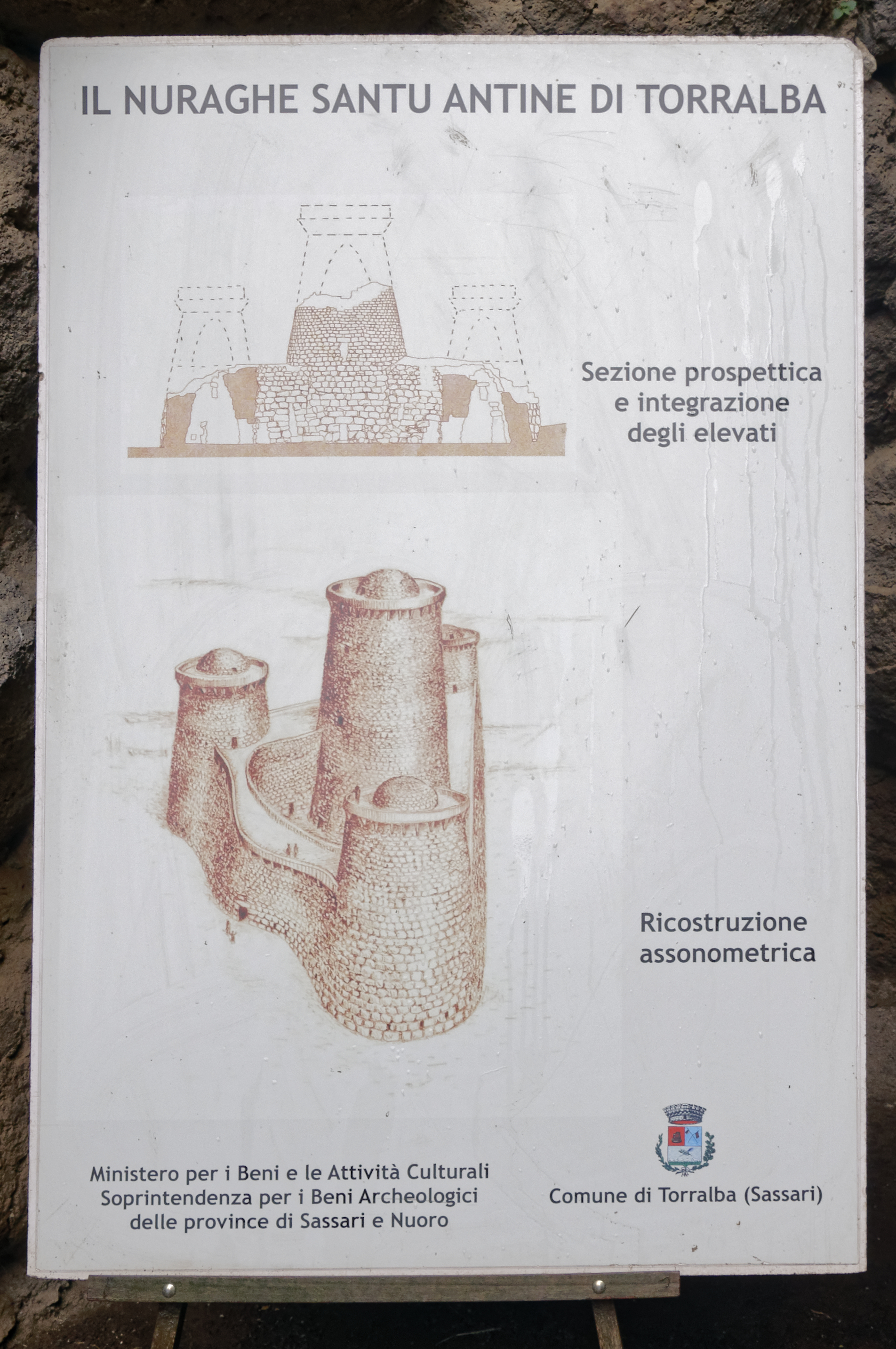
Reconstruction

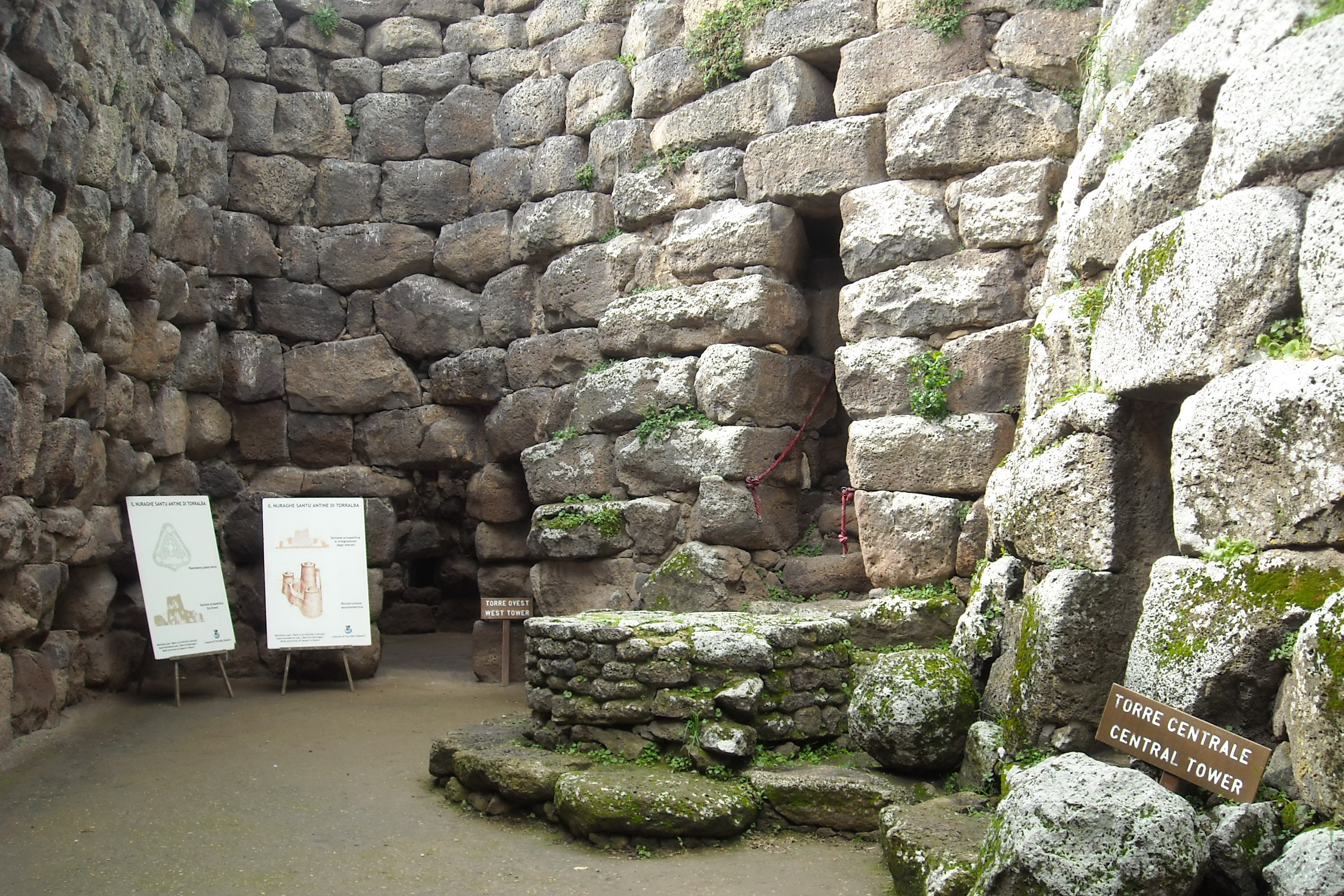
Courtyard

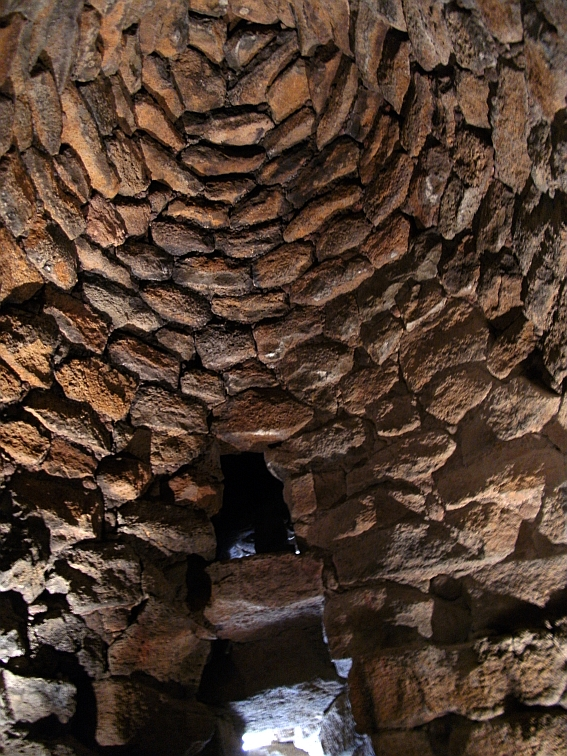
Tholos

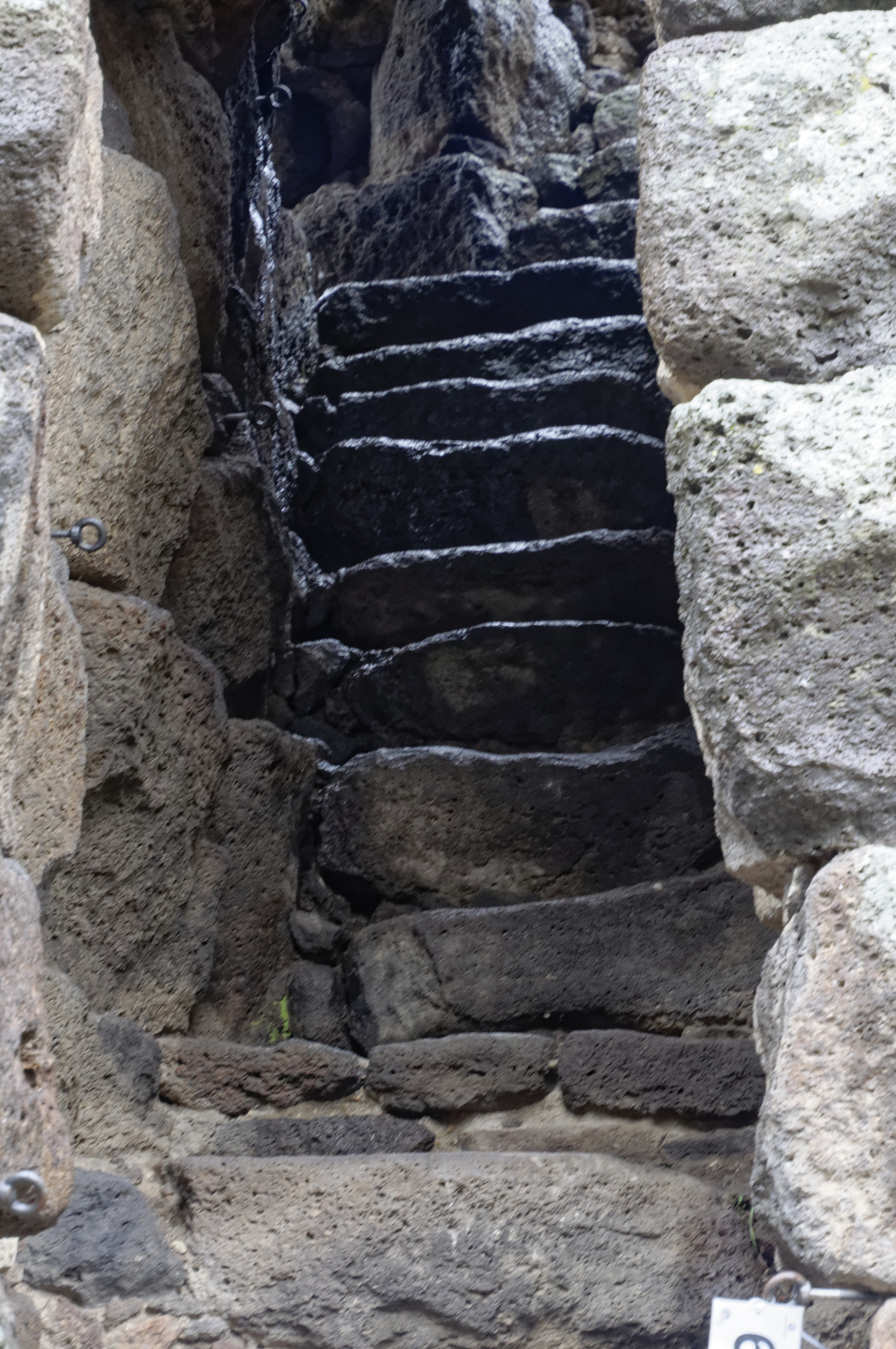
Stairs

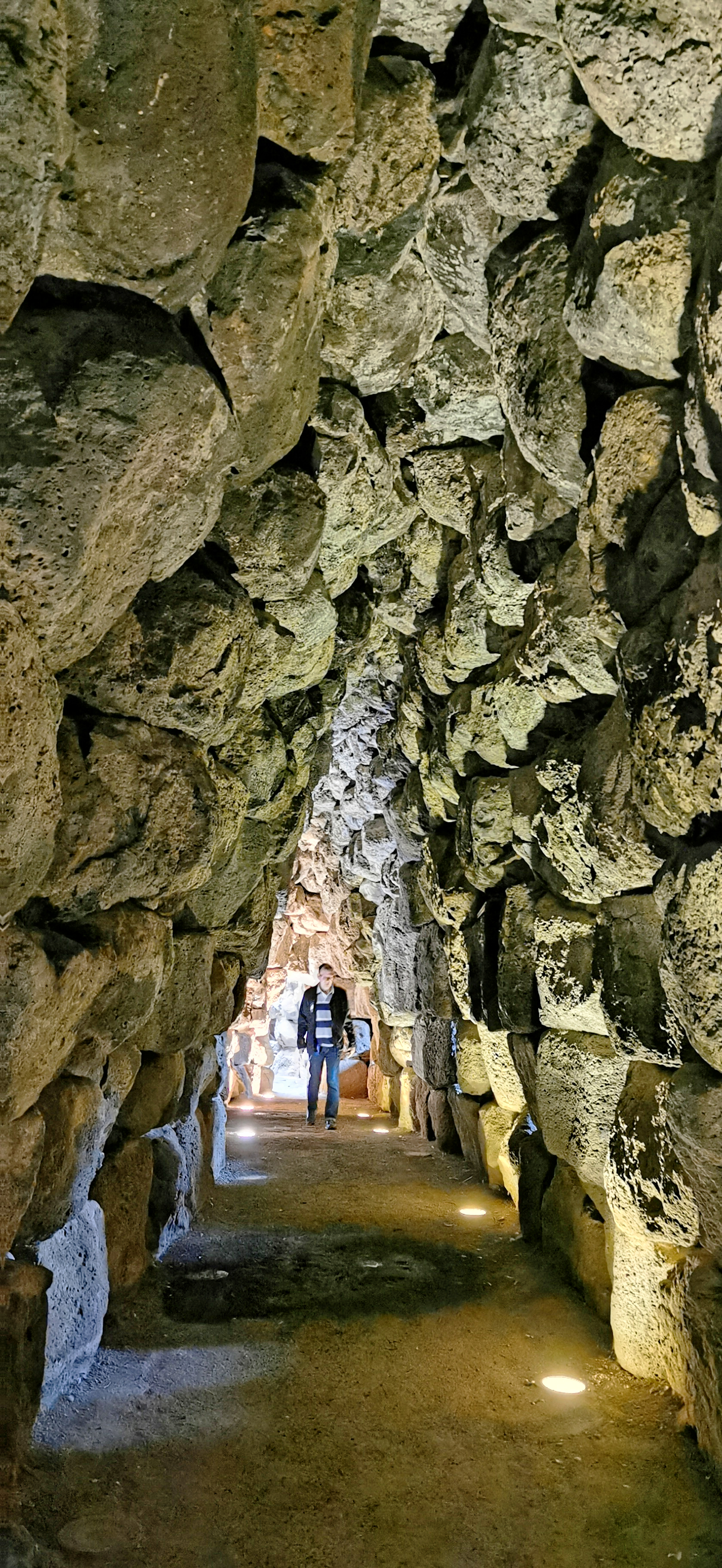
Internal corridor

== See also ==
- Nuragic civilization
- Nuraghe

== Bibliography ==
- Il Nuraghe Santu Antine, Ercole Contu, 1988. (PDF available at Sardegna Digital Library.)
- Belmonte Avilés, Juan Antonio; Hoskin, Michael (2002). Reflejo del cosmos : atlas de arqueoastronomía en el Mediterráneo antiguo (in Spanish). Madrid: Equipo Sirius. ISBN 84-95495-32-5. OCLC 52224308.
