= Ada Natali =

First woman mayor in Italy (1898–1990)

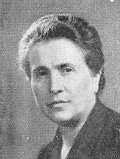
Official portrait for the Chamber of Deputies, 1948

Ada Natali (5 March 1898 in Massa Fermana – 27 April 1990 in Massa Fermana) was an Italian politician. She served in the Italian Chamber of Deputies and was also among the first women to serve as mayor in Italy.

== Life and career ==
Ada Natali was born in Massa Fermana to Giuseppe Natali, the socialist mayor of her hometown, and Argia Germani, a teacher. She studied at the teaching institute in Ascoli Piceno, after receiving her qualifications in 1921, she taught at school in Massa Fermana for ten years. In 1929, she enrolled in the law faculty at the University of Macerata. In 1946, she was elected as the mayor of Massa Fermana after running as a candidate of the Italian Communist Party (PCI) and served in that post until 1959. In 1948, she was elected to the Chamber of Deputies as a member of the PCI.

During the 1950s, she supported the struggles of workers employed in hat factories to obtain a national contract of employment. Natali also served as director of the feminist Unione donne italiane.

== See also ==
- List of first women mayors
- Electoral firsts in Italy
