= Torralba, Sardinia =

Torralba Turalva
- Comune
- Comune di Torralba
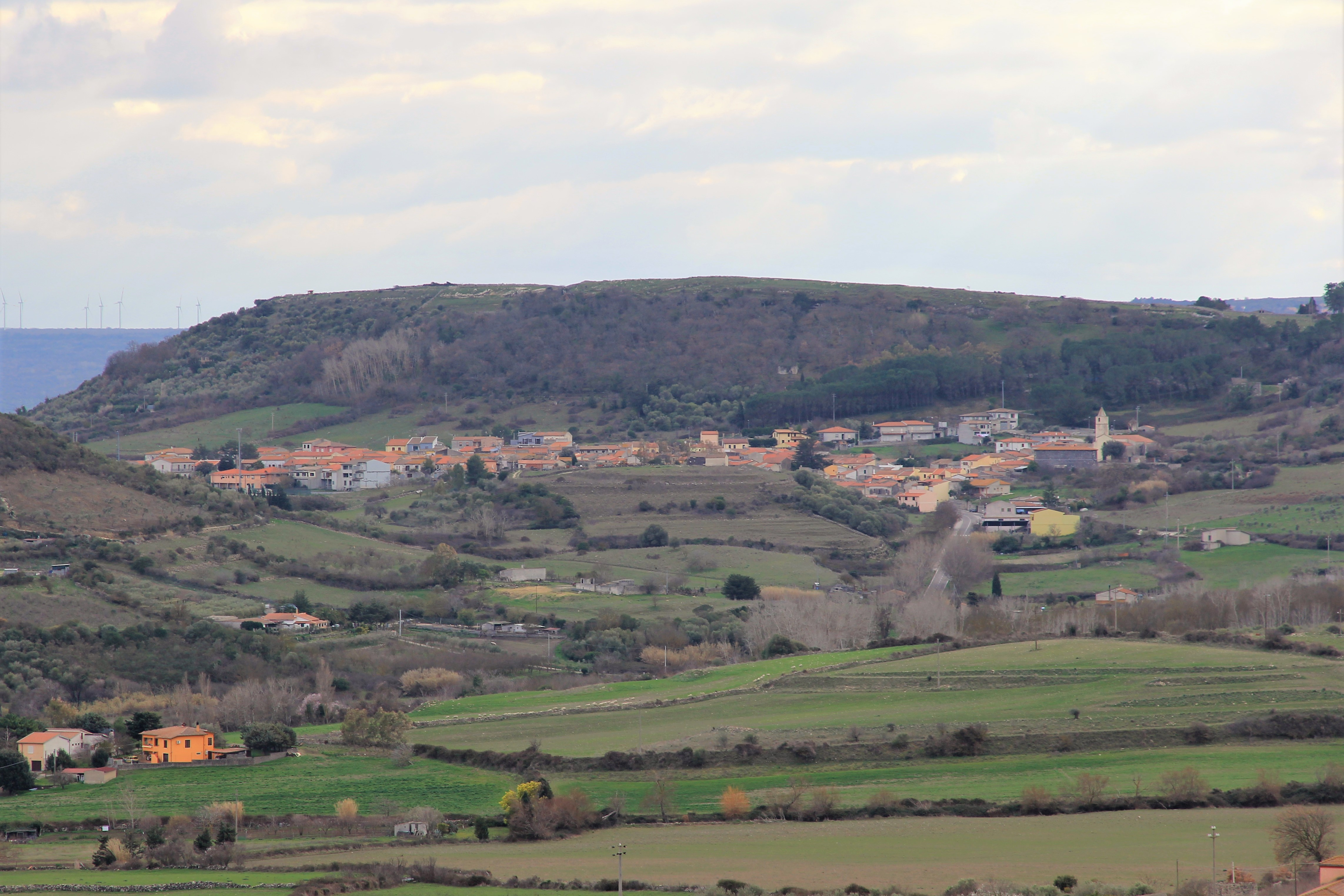

- Coat of arms

- Location within Sardinia
- Coordinates: 40°31′N 8°46′E
- Country: Italy
- Region: Sardinia
- Metropolitan city: Sassari (SS)
- Frazioni: Bonnanaro, Bonorva, Borutta, Cheremule, Giave, Mores

Government
  - Mayor: Pier Paolo Mulas (since 2022)

Area
  - Total: 36.75 km^{2} (14.19 sq mi)
- Elevation: 435 m (1,427 ft)

Population (2024)
  - Total: 874
  - Density: 23.8/km^{2} (61.6/sq mi)
- Demonym: Torralbesi
- Time zone: UTC+1 (CET)
  - Summer (DST): UTC+2 (CEST)
- Postal code: 07048
- Dialing code: 079

Torralba (Sardinian: Turalva) is a town and commune in Sardinia, Italy, administratively part of the Metropolitan City of Sassari.

The communal territory is home to the Nuraghe palace of Nuraghe Santu Antine.

== History ==
The area has been inhabited since the Neolithic, as evidenced by the numerous domus de janas found beneath the San Pietro di Sorres plateau. However, Torralba's most significant historical period occurred during the Nuragic Age, as evidenced by the more than thirty nuraghes and over ten giants' tombs found in its territory. Among the most important nuraghes in the Torralba area are the Ruju nuraghe and undoubtedly the Santu Antine nuragic complex, one of the largest and best preserved in Sardinia, with a 17-meter-high central tower.

The town of Torralba is mentioned for the first time in a historical document dated around 1064-65. In the Middle Ages, the town belonged to the curatoria of Meilogu, in the Giudicato of Torres and arose around the church of Santa Maria. With the fall of the Giudicato (1259), it came under the dominion of the Genoese Doria family.

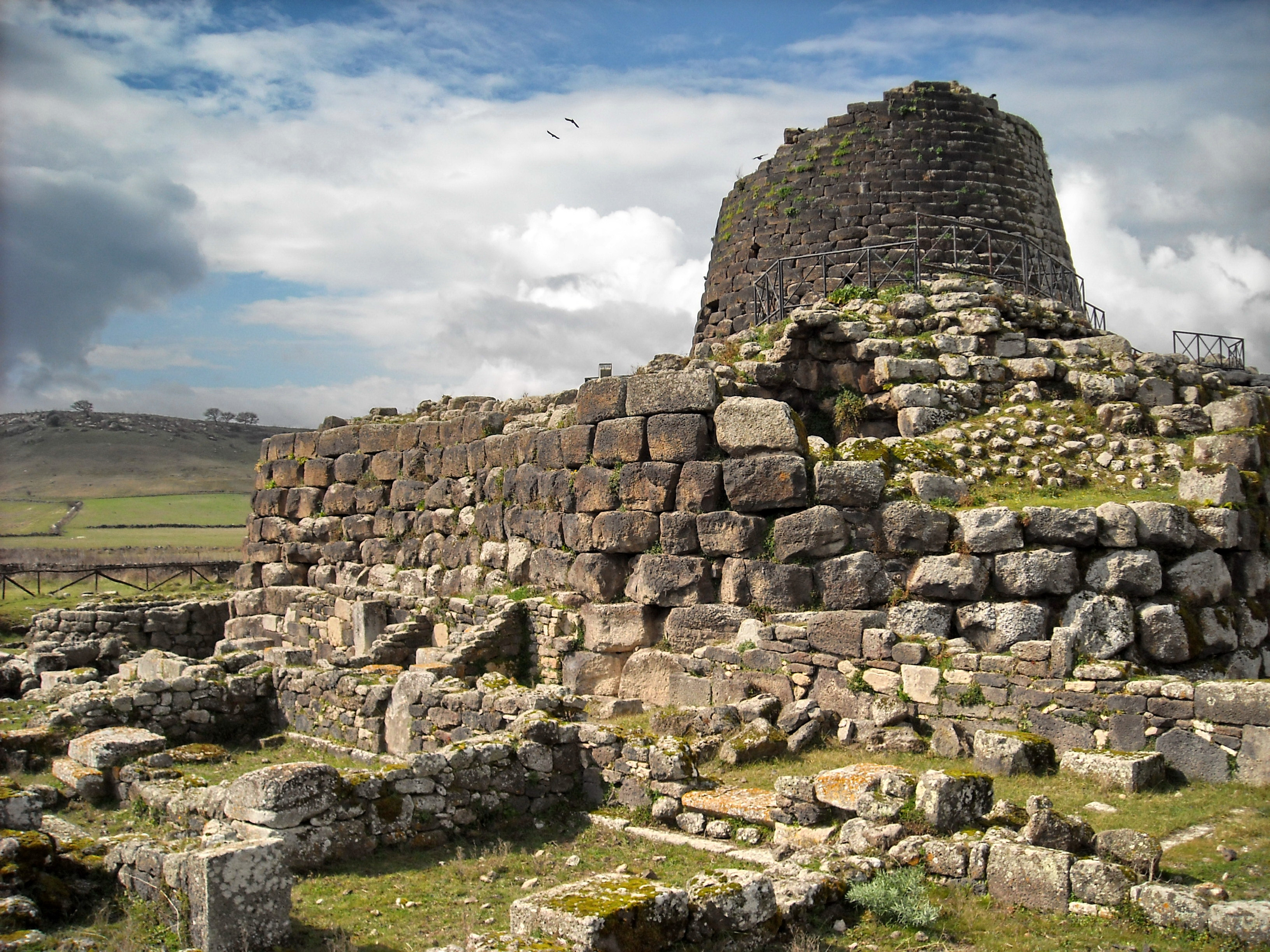
The Nuraghe Santu Antine in Torralba
