= San Domenico, Fermo =

Roman Catholic co-cathedral in Fermo, Italy

Coordinates: 43.160545°N 13.719401°E

San Domenico is a Gothic-style Roman Catholic co-cathedral located on Largo Maranesi in Fermo, in the region of Marche, Italy.

== History ==
The church was built from 1233 to 1491 at the site of a prior church dedicated to San Tommaso di Canterbury (Thomas Becket). The Dominicans had come to Fermo after San Domenico di Guzman visited the town in 1214. The church has undergone numerous reconstructions. The present brick façade has a rose window and a single portal built in late-Romanesque-Gothic-style in 1455. The inner arch of the portal is rounded with a floral motif, while the outer border peaks in an acute angle. The niche in the pediment of the portal has a small statue of St Dominic. The façade remains unfinished.

To the right, is a smaller door leading to an oratory dedicated to the Madonna of the Rosary. The bell-tower has gothic mullioned windows, restored in 1733.

The interior has a single nave refurbished in 1846-1848 by the architect Luigi Fontana.

The chapel of the Holy Sacrament once held the painting of the Last Supper by Nicola Antonio Monti. The main altar was consecrated in 1422 and made with travertine. The wooden choir stalls were carved in 1448 by Giovanni da Montelparo. The organ shutters have carved wooden baroque decorations from 1695, and gilded in the next century. The instrument was rebuilt in 1803 by Gaetano Antonio Callido.
