= Massa Fermana =

- Comune
- Comune di Massa Fermana
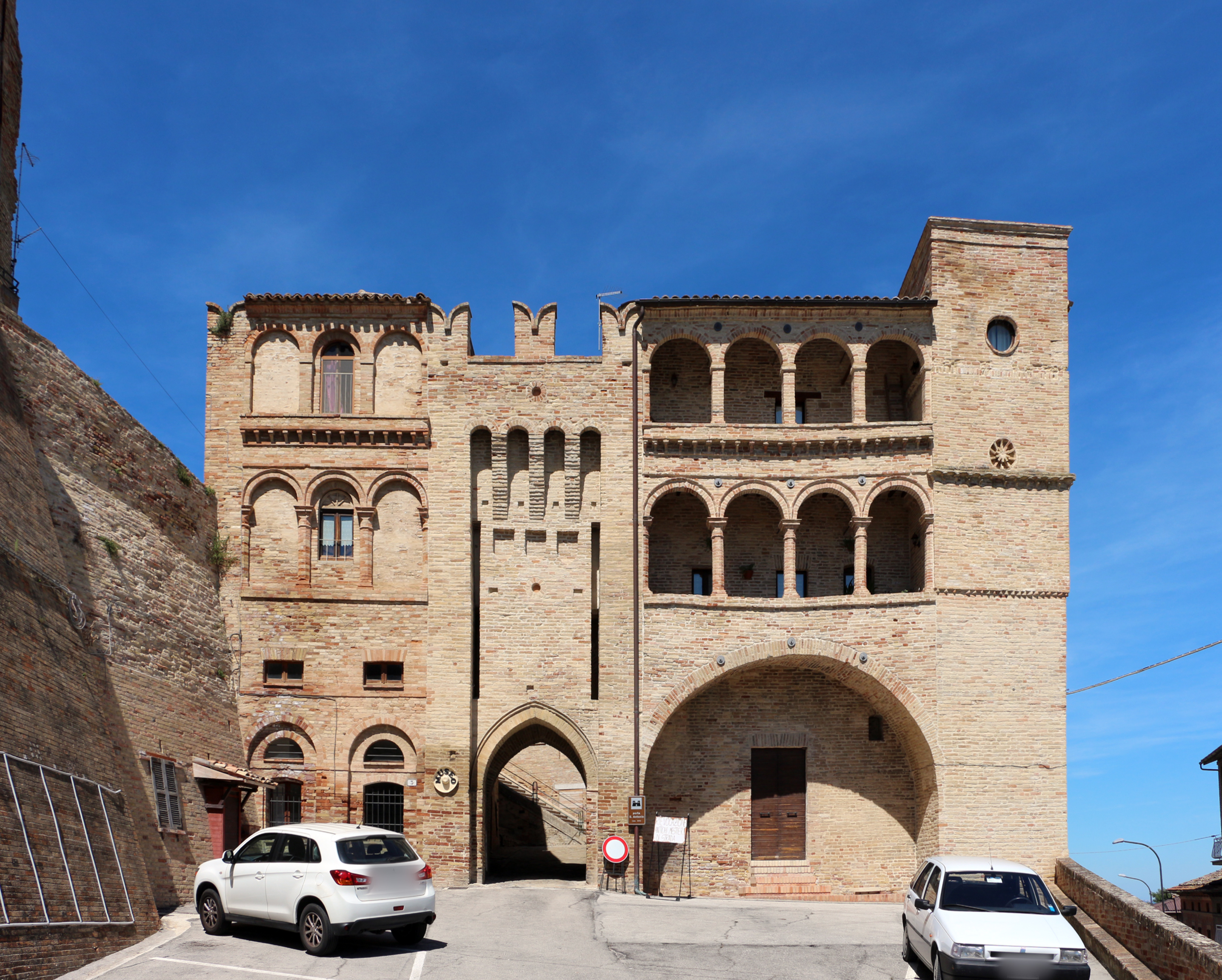

- Location within Italy Location within Marche
- Coordinates: 43°9′N 13°28′E
- Country: Italy
- Region: Marche
- Province: Fermo (FM)

Government
  - Mayor: Giampiero Tarulli

Area
  - Total: 7.7 km^{2} (3.0 sq mi)
- Elevation: 340 m (1,120 ft)

Population (1 January 2008)
  - Total: 970
  - Density: 130/km^{2} (330/sq mi)
- Demonym: Massetani
- Time zone: UTC+1 (CET)
  - Summer (DST): UTC+2 (CEST)
- Postal code: 63020
- Dialing code: 0734
- Patron saint: St. Lawrence
- Saint day: August 10

Massa Fermana is a comune (municipality) in the Province of Fermo in the Italian region Marche, located about 50 kilometres (31 mi) south of Ancona and about 35 kilometres (22 mi) northwest of Ascoli Piceno.

The parish church of Santi Lorenzo, Silvestro, e Ruffino houses the Massa Fermana Altarpiece (1468) by Carlo Crivelli. The St Anthony Gate dates to the 14th century.

In 1946, Ada Natali become mayor of this town, being the first female mayor in Italy's history.
