= Amico Ricci =

Italian art historian

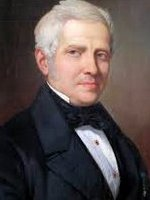

Amico Ricci Petrocchini, Petruccini or Petruchini (1794-1862) was an Italian art historian and marquess. He is most notable for his 1834 Memorie storiche delle arti e degli artisti della Marca di Ancona, the first systematic survey of art history in the Marche. He also composed a number of cantatas for viola (1862).

== Life ==
Born in Macerata to a noble family from that town. He was a knight of the Ordine Mauriziano and was made a member of Macerata's Accademia dei Catenati as recognition for his "dissertazioni". He died in Modena.

== Works ==
- Elogio del pittore Gentile da Fabriano, Macerata, Giuseppe Mancini Cortesi, 1829.
- Le belle arti nella città di Gubbio, Bologna, Romano Turchi, 1831.
- Operette di belle arti, Bologna, Romano Turchi, 1831.
- Memorie storiche delle arti e degli artisti della Marca di Ancona, Macerata, Alessandro Mancini, 1834, 2 volumes (Volume I).
- Compendio delle memorie istoriche delle arti e degli artisti della marca d'Ancona, Bologna, Sassi alla Volpe, 1835.
- Dello stato geografico e politico del Piceno dopo la guerra marsica o sociale fino alla pontificia dominazione, Roma, Boulzaler, 1836.
- Dell'anello nuziale. Epistola del marchese Amico cavalier Ricci per le nozze della sorella Alba con il nobil uomo signor Giuseppe Lazzarini, Macerata, Cortesi, 1837.
- "Necrologia dell'abate Michele Colombo", in Giornale letterario-scientifico di Modena, giugno 1838.
- Monumento di Andrea Manfredi da Faenza, 13º generale dell'ordine de' Servi, Bologna, Jacopo Marsigli, 1840.
- Torri degli Asinelli e Garisendi, Torino, Fontana, 1840.
- Iscrizione sepolcrale di Guido Reni ed Elisabetta Sirani esistente in San Domenico di Bologna, Bologna, Marsigli, 1842.
- Degli uomini illustri di Macerata, Roma, Tipografia delle belle arti, 1847.
- Sulle arti degli antichissimi popoli. Lezioni, Perugia, Bartelli, 1847.
- Storia dell'architettura in Italia dal secolo IV al XVIII, Modena, Regio-ducal Camera, 1857-1859, 3 voll. Ristampa anastatica: Bologna, Forni, 1967.

== Bibliography (in Italian) ==
- Anna Maria Ambrosini Massari (editor), Dotti amici. Amico Ricci e la nascita della storia dell'arte nelle Marche, Ancona, Il lavoro editoriale, 2007. ISBN 978-88-7663-420-8.
- Anna Maria Ambrosini Massari, "Ricci, Maggiori, Gentile: la nascita della storia dell'arte nelle Marche e un disegno", in Cecilia Prete (a cura di), Gentile da Fabriano "Magister magistrorum" (atti delle Giornate di studio tenute a Fabriano il 28-30 giugno 2005), Sassoferrato, Istituto internazionale di studi piceni, 2006, pp. 129–146.
