= Menichetti =

Menichetti is a Chilean surname. Notable people with the surname include:

- Eduardo Menichetti (1950 or 1951–2007), Chilean businessman
- Pablo Menichetti (born 1973), Chilean author and coach

== See also ==
- Villa Menichetti
