= Andrea Boscoli =

Italian painter (1560-1607)

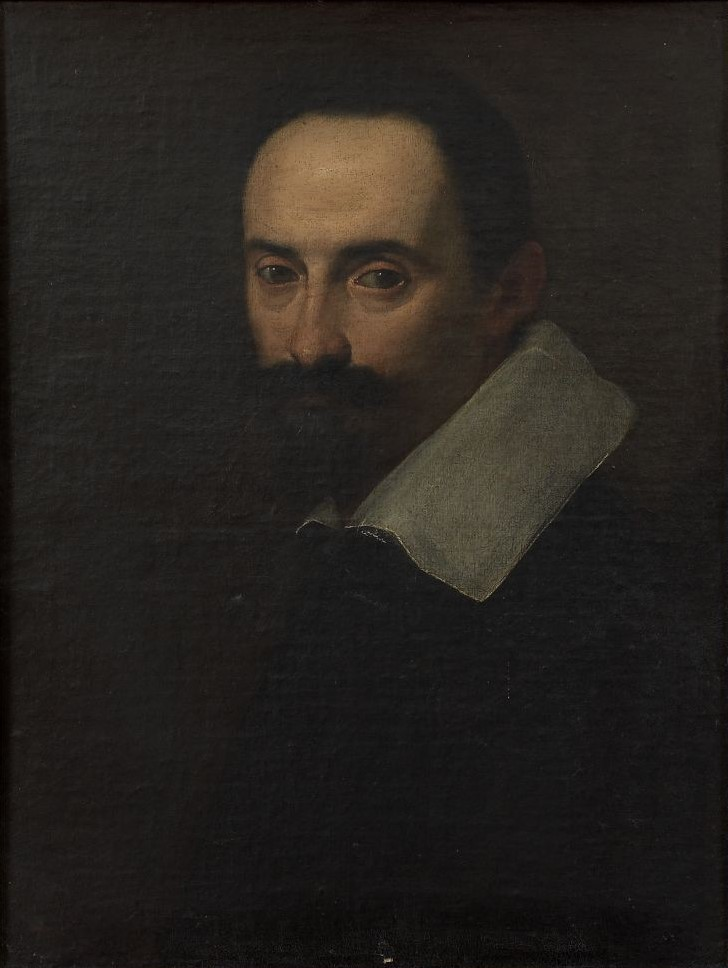
- Self-portrait, c. 1595–1599, Uffizi, Florence
- Born: c. 1560; Florence, Duchy of Florence
- Died: March 1607; Florence, Duchy of Florence
- Education: Santi di Tito
- Known for: Painting; Drawing
- Movement: Counter-Mannerism

Andrea Boscoli (c. 1560 – March 1607) was an Florentine painter and draftsman of the late Renaissance.

== Biography ==
Andrea Boscoli was born in Florence around 1560. He was a pupil of Santi di Tito, probably in the eighth decade of the 16th century. It was perhaps in the early years of the following decade that Boscoli went to Rome for a short educational trip, during which he made mainly drawings from antiquity and from the friezes of Polidoro da Caravaggio.

On 1 March 1584, Boscoli matriculated in the Accademia delle Arti del Disegno in Florence. No paintings from his early years have survived. His early drawings draw inspiration from early 16th-century masters such as Pontormo, Rosso Fiorentino, Andrea del Sarto, Polidoro da Caravaggio and Perino del Vaga. In 1587, Boscoli painted the fresco depicting the Martyrdom of St. Bartholomew in the small cloister of San Pier Maggiore, Florence. The fresco reflects the influence of Santi di Tito's counter-Mannerist style through distinct, highly personal touches. Works dating from this period include his Marriage at Cana (Florence, Uffizi) and the Triumph of Mordecai (Los Angeles County Museum of Art).

His religious commissions are imbued with sincere Counter-Reformation devotion and keen naturalism, a quality that reached its zenith in his St. Francis (National Museum of San Matteo, Pisa). In 1593, Boscoli created athe Annunciation for the Church of Santa Maria del Carmine, Pisa. The following year, he painted frescoes for the small Church of San Matteo, most of which have since been destroyed. His Miracle of St. Nicholas in the Church of San Lorenzo alle Rose in Florence dates to 1596. In 1597, he produced a series of drawings depicting the Passion of Christ, which were later engraved by Pieter de Jode and published in Siena. He also produced two oval drawings illustrating stories of St. Nicholas (Florence, Uffizi), which may have been intended as panels for a private cabinet. These sketches attest to his extensive travels and keen cultural curiosity. Works dating from 1599 include a small painting of St. John Resurrecting Drusiana (Philadelphia, Philadelphia Museum of Art, Johnson Collection), notable for its fine, naturalistic treatment of light, and an altarpiece depicting the St John the Baptist Preaching Among the Pharisees for the Carmelite church of San Giovanni Battista, Rimini.

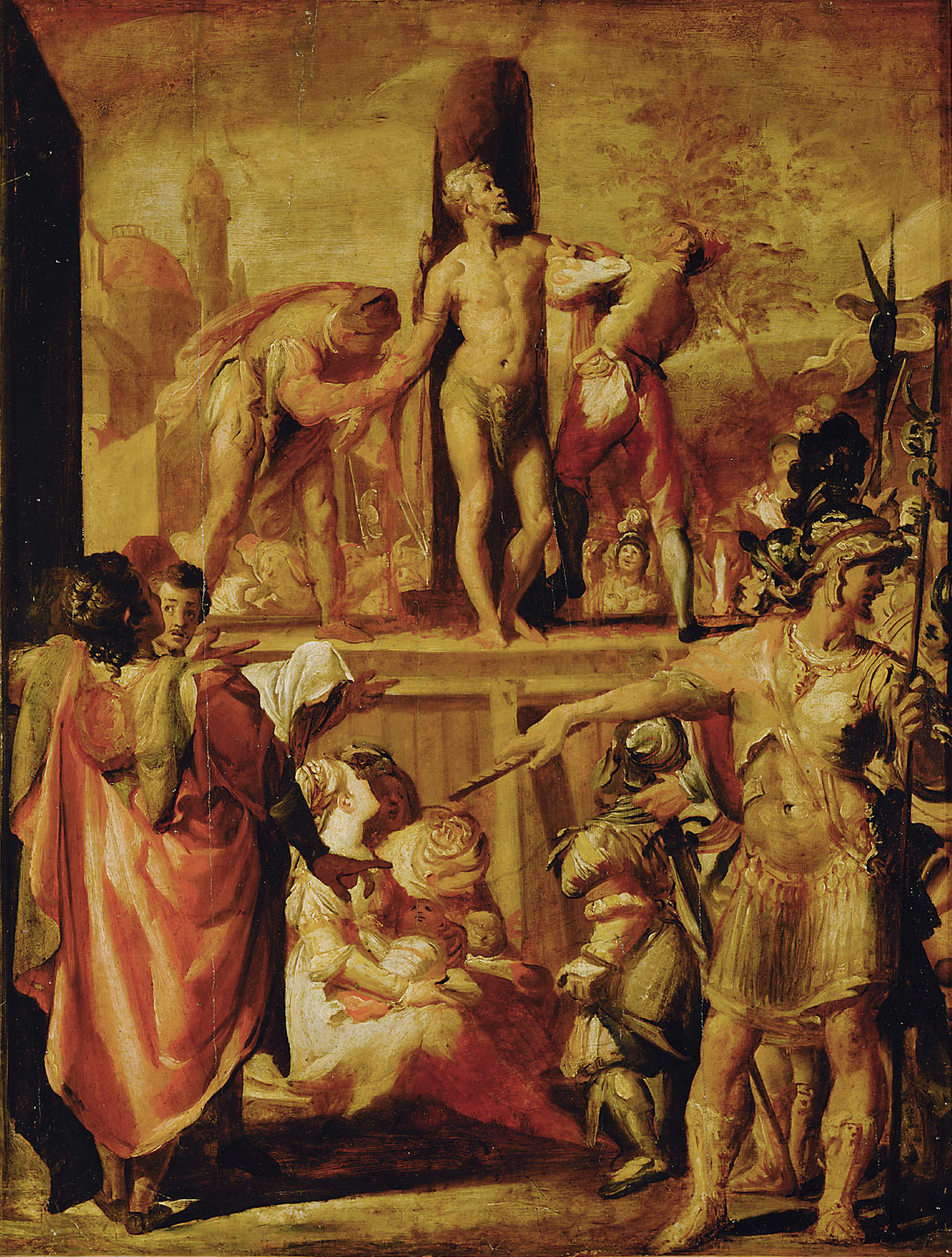
Martyrdom of St. Bartholomew, Kunsthistorisches Museum, Vienna

In the early 1600s, Boscoli relocated to the Marche. During his six years there, he developed a more intense use of light and greater compositional breadth. Works from 1600 include a pair of altarpieces in the monastery of San Luca in Fabriano, frescoes in the local foundling hospital which show some affinity with Barocci's style, and a Nativity (Fabriano, Pinacoteca Civica). In 1600, he created a Madonna with Saints for the Macerata Cathedral. His work in Fermo probably dates from a slightly later period and includes a Circumcision (Fermo Cathedral) and the Stories of the Virgin for the church of Santa Maria Piccinina. In 1603, he painted a series of frescoes in the apse of the Basilica of the Misericordia in Sant'Elpidio a Mare, which bear some resemblance to the flamboyant 'neo-Mannerism' of Andrea Lilio. The Virgin of the Girdle (1604; Macerata, Palazzo Buonaccorsi) features vivid colours and a grand compositional structure, perhaps influenced by the work of the Carracci.

By February 1606, Boscoli had returned to Florence, where he produced various drawings, as well as the large canvas St. Sebastian (Florence, Uffizi). He died between 12 February and 24 March 1607. Although he left no pupils, the fresh imagination displayed in his works proved particularly significant for several 17th-century artists, such as Jacques Callot and Giovanni da San Giovanni.

Boscoli is best remembered as an original and innovative draughtsman. He produced a prolific body of drawings throughout his career, particularly sketches, which he executed quickly in pencil and pen after paintings by contemporary artists in Florence and elsewhere. Boscoli's draftsmanship is distinguished by a linear approach to form resulting from his Florentine training. He retains the ornamental penmanship, sharp spatial contrasts and graceful elongations of Mannerism. However, the less ambiguous definition of space and more natural depiction of emotion in his drawings are intimations of the coming Baroque style.

== Gallery ==
=== Paintings ===
The Muses telling Minerva about the transformation of the Pierides into magpies, National Museum in Wrocław

St. Sebastian, Florence, Uffizi

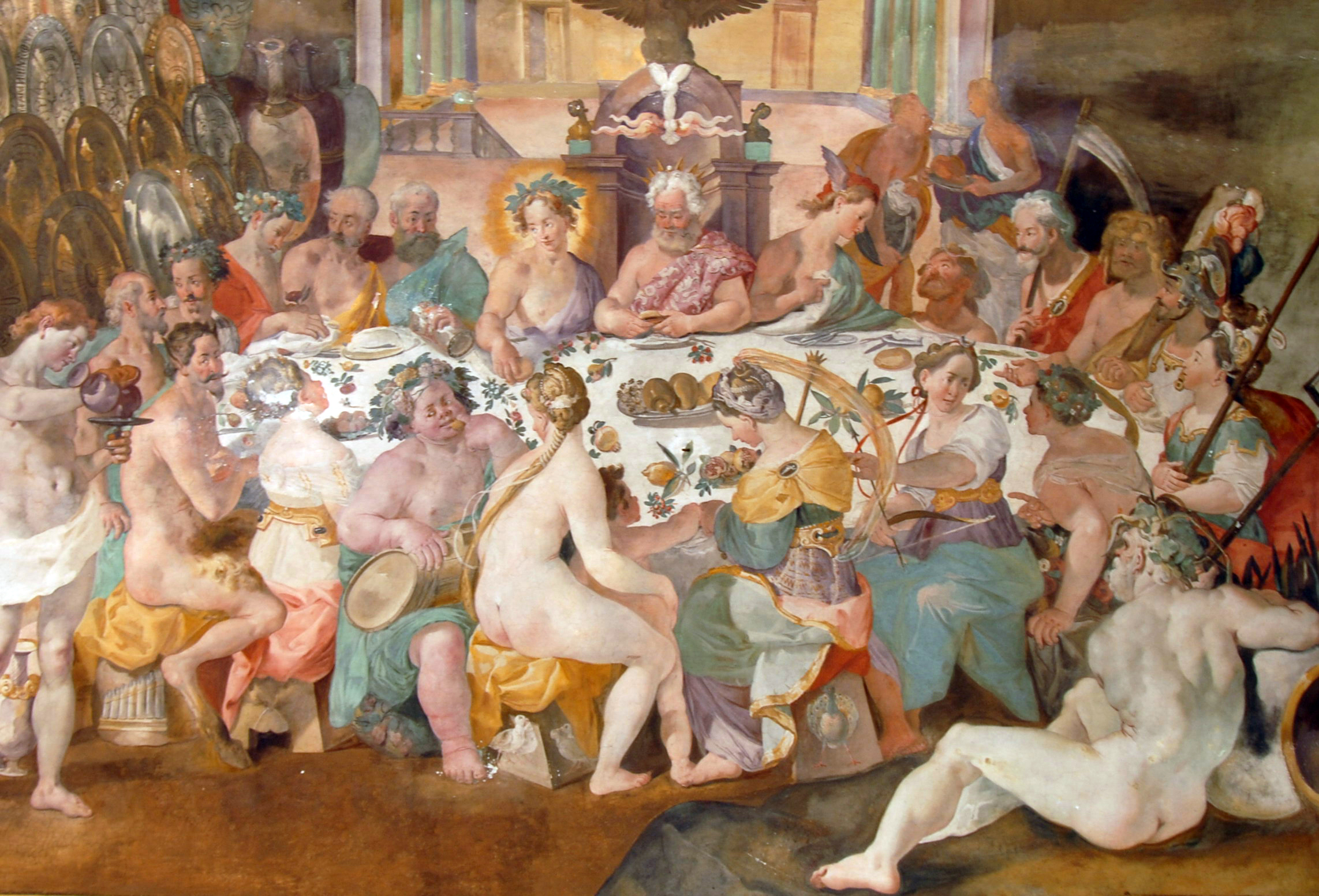
The Banquet of the Gods, fresco in the Main Hall of the Villa di Corliano, Pisa

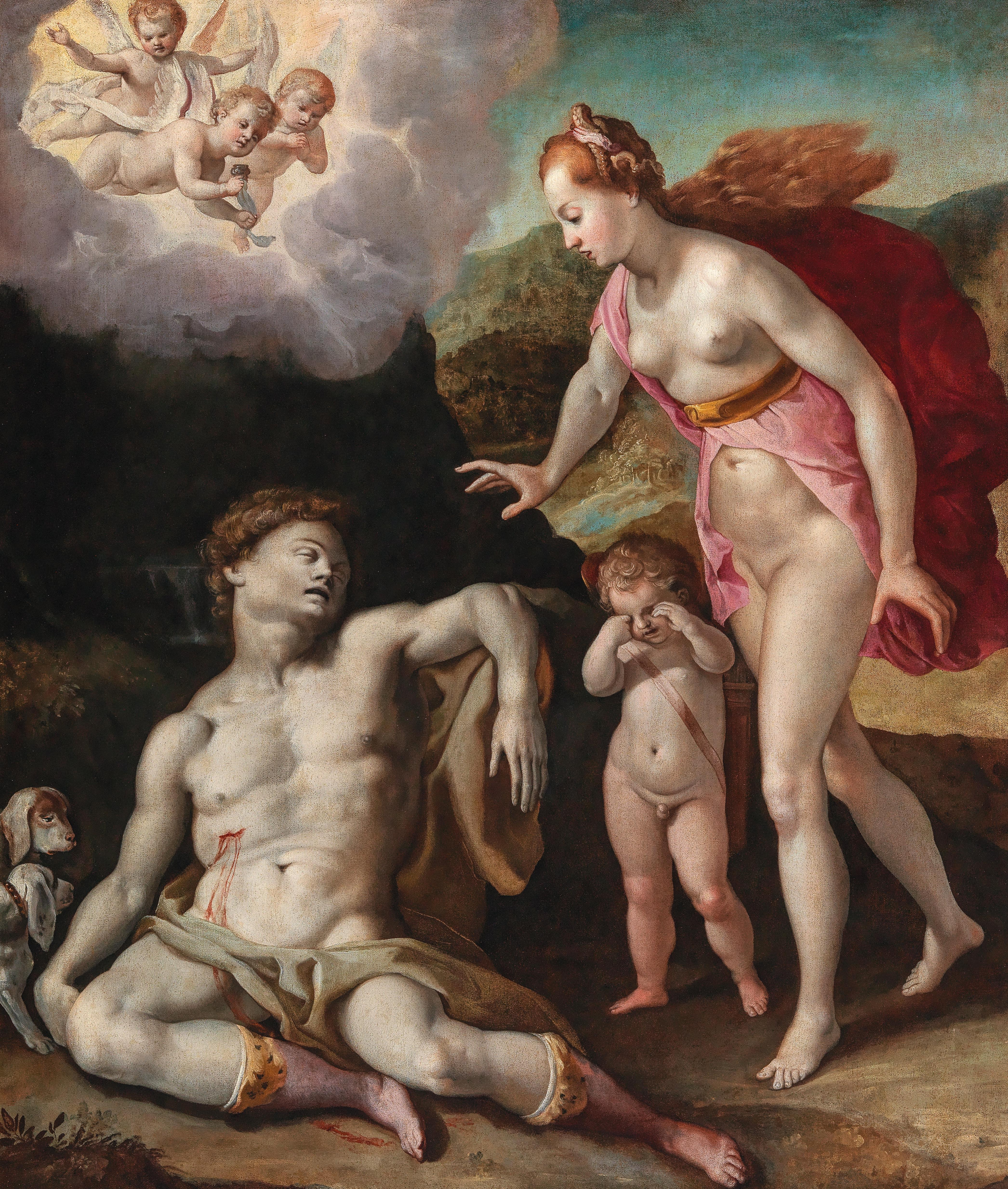
Venus mourning the death of Adonis, priv. col.

=== Drawings ===
Resurrection of Christ (after Pontormo), Kupferstichkabinett Berlin

St. Francis of Assisi Invests New Monks, National Gallery of Denmark, Copenhagen

Two Roman warriors fighting, Leiden University Library

Suovetaurilia, Leiden University Library

Scenes from Ancient History (after Polidoro da Caravaggio), Metropolitan Museum of Art, New York

Scenes from Ancient History (after Polidoro da Caravaggio), Metropolitan Museum of Art, New York

Study for a Nude, Rijksmuseum, Amsterdam

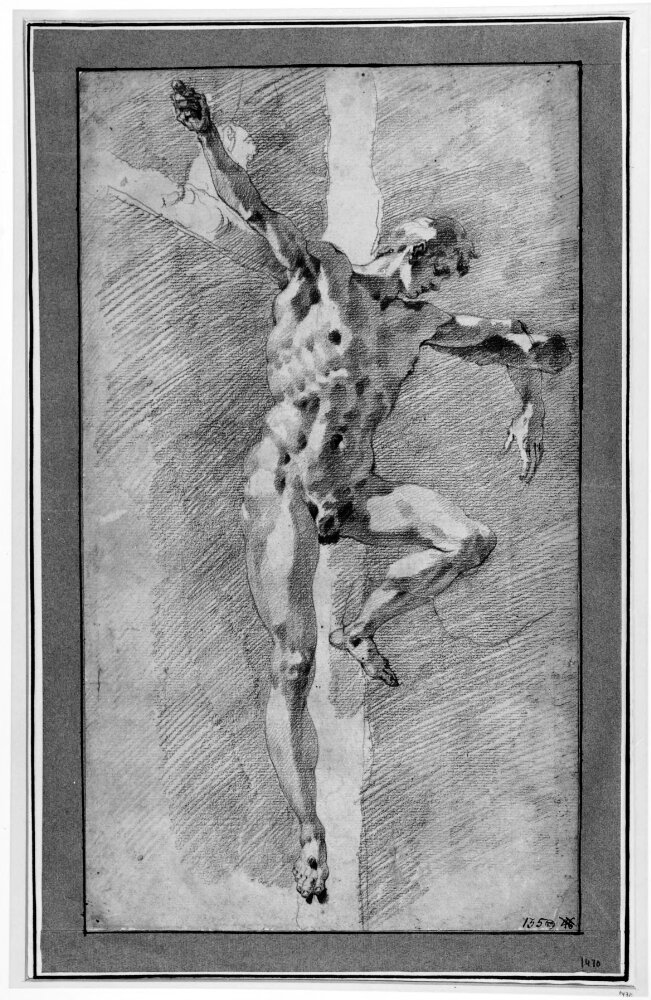
Study for the penitent thief, Nationalmuseum, Stockholm

== Bibliography ==
- Bryan, Michael (1886). Graves, Robert Edmund (ed.). Dictionary of Painters and Engravers, Biographical and Critical. Vol. I A-K. London: George Bell and Sons. p. 161.
- Forlani Tempesti, Anna (1971). "BOSCOLI, Andrea". Dizionario Biografico degli Italiani (in Italian). Vol. 13: Borremans–Brancazolo. Rome: Institute of the Italian Encyclopaedia. ISBN 978-88-12-00032-6.
