= Basilica Lateranense di Maria Santissima della Misericordia, Sant'Elpidio a Mare =

Church building in Sant'Elpidio a Mare, Italy

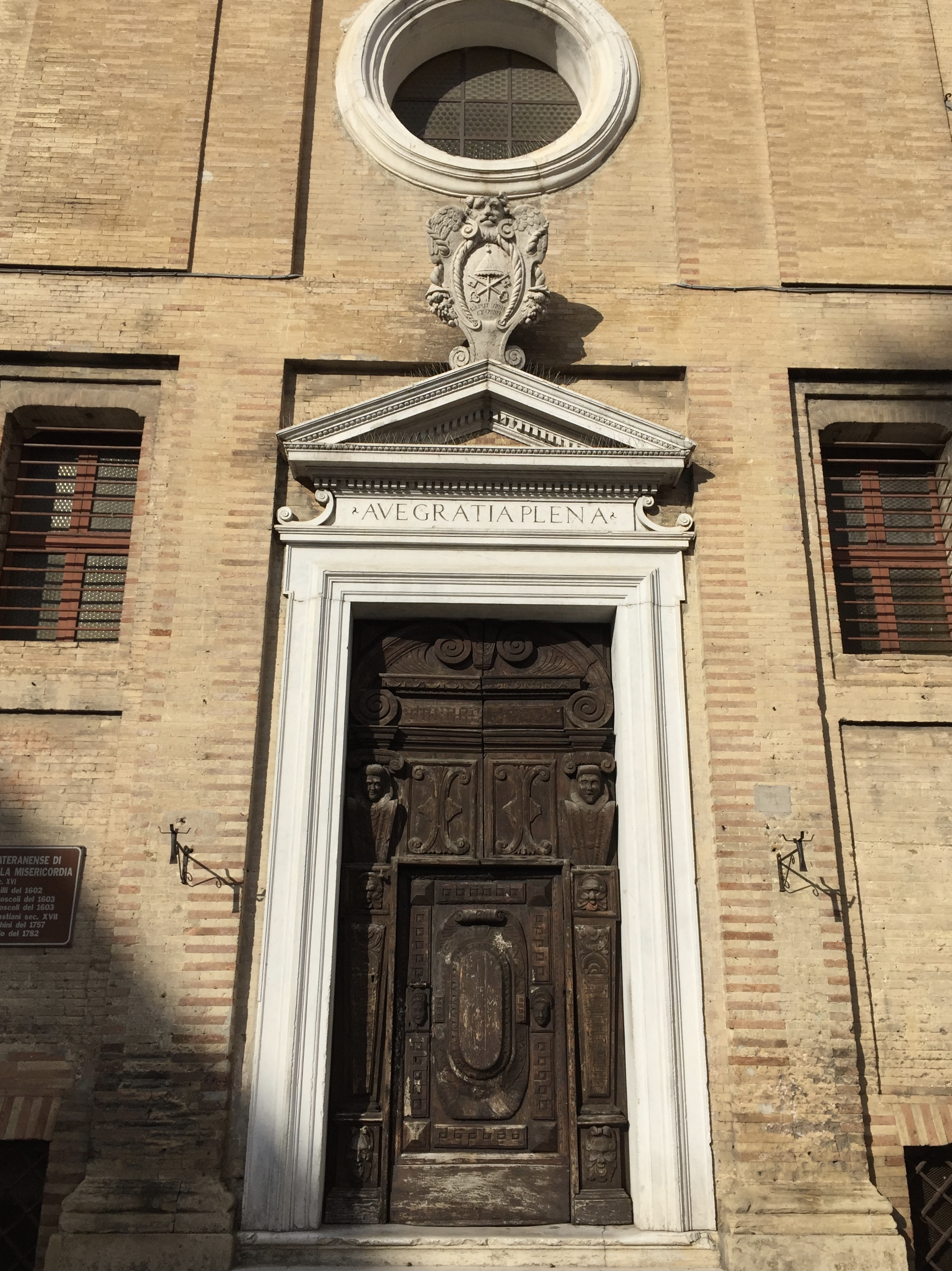

The Basilica Lateranense di Maria Santissima della Misericordia is a Renaissance-style, Roman Catholic basilica church located on Piazza Matteotti in the town of Sant'Elpidio a Mare in the province of Fermo, region of Marche, Italy.

== History ==
On June 1, 1939, the Archconfraternity of Maria della Misericordia erected a small church at the site was built as an ex-voto for the ebbing of the Bubonic plague. The church is dedicated to the Marian veneration of the Virgene della Misericordia.

Construction of the present Basilica Lateranense began in 1575. In front is the Torre Gerosolimitana, erected by the Knights Hospitaller in the 14th century. The interior of the church has elaborate stucco decoration. It still houses an altarpiece to the right of the main altar, depicting the Miracle of Santa Marta (1602) by Andrea Lilli of Ancona; frescoes (1603) by Andrea Boscoli. The nave has frescoed depicting Birth of Mary, Marriage of the Virgin, and a Madonna della Misericordia (17th century) by Cristoforo Roncalli. Since 1974 it houses a church organ (1757) by Pietro Nacchini.
