= Pacini =

Pacini may refer to the following persons:

- Alfredo Pacini, an Italian prelate of the Roman Catholic Church
- Clara Pacini (born 2002), French actress
- Domenico Pacini, an Italian physicist
- Edoardo Pacini, an Italian footballer
- Émilien Pacini, a 19th-century French librettist of Italian origin
- Filippo Pacini, an Italian anatomist
- Francesco Pacini (born 1906, date of death unknown), Italian modern pentathlete
- Francesco Pacini (footballer)
- Franco Pacini, an Italian astrophysicist
- Giovanni Pacini, a 19th-century Italian composer, known mostly for his operas
- Giuseppe Pacini, an Italian footballer
- José Pacini, an Argentine football player
- Mark Pacini, an American video game designer
- Piero Pacini da Pescia (1495-1514), Italian publisher
- Regina Pacini, a Portuguese lyric soprano and First Lady of Argentina
- Roberto Pacini, an Italian director, author and theatre and film producer
- Sante Pacini (1735 - circa 1790), Italian painter and engraver active mostly in Tuscany in an early Neoclassic style
- Sophie Pacini (born 1991), German-Italian pianist

It may also refer to:

- Pacinian corpuscle, mechanoreceptor responsible for sensitivity to deep pressure touch and high frequency vibration
