= Paolo dal Pozzo Toscanelli =

Italian Renaissance astronomer (1397–1482)

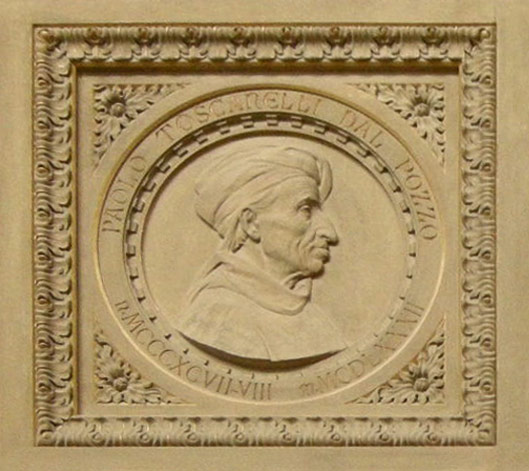
Paolo dal Pozzo Toscanelli

Paolo dal Pozzo Toscanelli (1397 – 10 May 1482) was an Italian mathematician, astronomer, and cosmographer. Born in Florence, he was a notable local Renaissance figure. Christopher Columbus carried his map (depicting Asia to the west of Europe) on his first voyage to the New World.

== Life ==
Paolo dal Pozzo Toscanelli was born in Florence, the son of the physician Domenico Toscanelli and Biagia Mei. There is no precise information on his education and background. Gustavo Uzielli claimed in 1894 that Toscanelli studied at the University of Padua, but modern authors consider this pure conjecture. Toscanelli lived most of his life in Florence, with occasional excursions to Todi and Rome. He is said to have entered into correspondence with scholars around Europe, but his writings have yet to be thoroughly researched.

Thanks to his long life, his intelligence and his wide interests, Toscanelli was one of the central figures in the intellectual and cultural history of Renaissance Florence in its early years. His circle of friends included Filippo Brunelleschi, the architect of the Florence Cathedral, and the philosopher Marsilio Ficino. He knew the mathematician, writer and architect Leon Battista Alberti, and his closest friend was Cardinal Nicholas of Cusa—himself a wide-ranging intellect and early humanist, who dedicated two short mathematical works in 1445 to Toscanelli, and made himself and Toscanelli the interlocutors in a 1458 dialogue titled On Squaring the Circle (De quadratura circuli). When Nicholas of Cusa was on his death bed in the remote Perugian town of Todi in 1464, Toscanelli traversed 120 miles from Florence to be with him.

Toscanelli along with Nicholas of Cusa appears to have belonged to a network of Florentine and Roman intellectuals who searched for and studied Greek mathematical works, along with Filelfo, George of Trebizond, and the humanist Pope Nicholas V, in company with Alberti and Brunelleschi.

=== Cartography ===
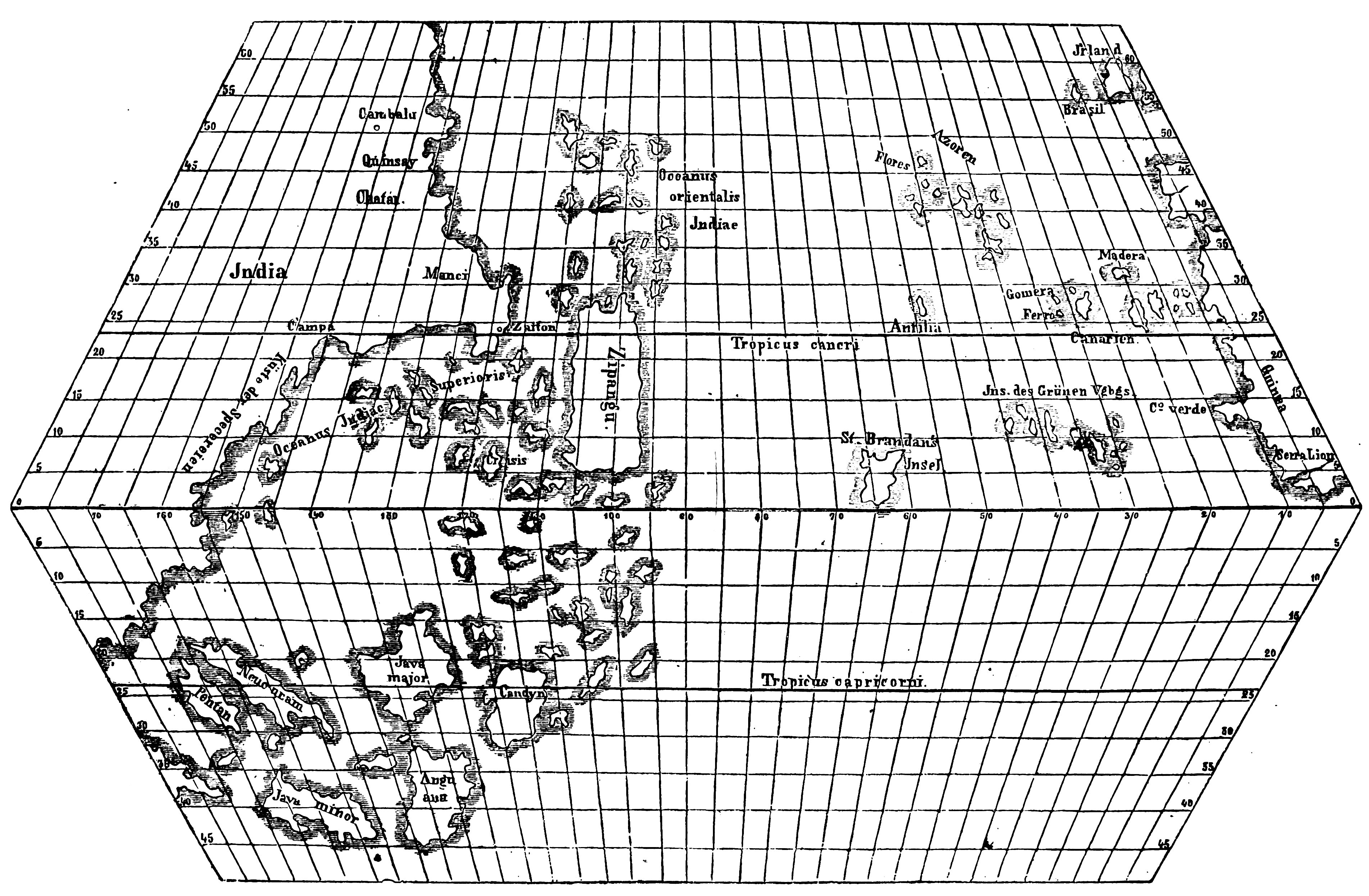
Speculative reconstruction made in 1898 of the map Toscanelli sent to Fernão Martins ("Zipangu" was a name for Japan)

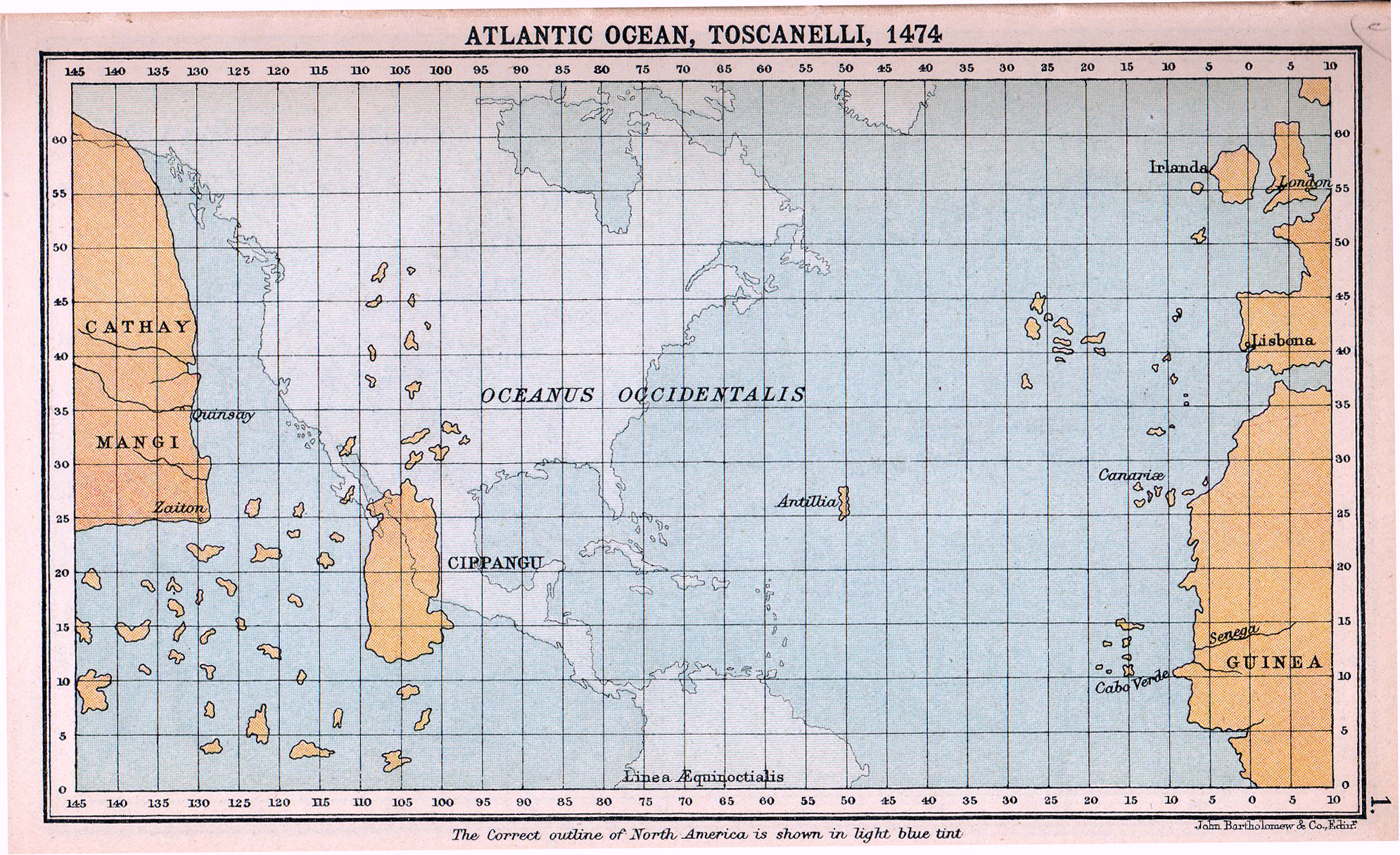
Comparison of Toscanelli's map (yellow) to the Americas (gray) ("Cippangu" was a name for Japan)

According to one theory, in 1439, the Greek philosopher Gemistos Plethon, attending the Council of Florence, acquainted Toscanelli with the extensive travels, writings and mapping of the 1st century BC/AD Greek geographer Strabo, hitherto unknown in Italy. Nearly 35 years later, the Italian was to follow up this amplified knowledge.

In 1474, Toscanelli sent a letter and a map to his Portuguese correspondent Fernão Martins, priest at the Lisbon Cathedral, detailing a scheme for sailing westwards to reach the Spice Islands and Asia. Fernão Martins delivered his letter to the King Afonso V of Portugal, in his court of Lisbon. The original of this letter was lost, but its existence is known through Toscanelli himself, who later transcribed it along with the map and sent it to Christopher Columbus, who carried them with him during his first voyage to the New World. Toscanelli had miscalculated Asia as being 5,000 miles longer than it really was, and Columbus miscalculated the circumference of the Earth by 25 percent: both of which resulted in Columbus not realizing initially he had found a new continent.

An uncorroborated story links Toscanelli’s attendance at a Chinese delegation to the Pope in 1432, when many Chinese inventions were discussed, with a flood of drawings made around the same year by the artist-engineer Taccola (1382 – c.1453), which were later developed by Brunelleschi and Leonardo da Vinci. In a 1474 letter by Toscanelli to Columbus, the authenticity of which has been a matter of disagreement among scholars, Toscanelli mentions the visit of men from Cathay (China) during the reign of Pope Eugenius IV (1431–1447):

Also in the time of Eugenius one of them [of Cathay] came to Eugenius, who affirmed their great kindness towards Christians, and I had a long conversation with him on many subjects, about the magnitude of their rivers in length and breath, and on the multitude of cities on the banks of rivers. He said that on one river there were near 200 cities with marble bridges great in length and breadth, and everywhere adorned with columns. This country is worth seeking by the Latins, not only because great wealth may be obtained from it, gold and silver, all sorts of gems, and spices, which never reach us; but also on account of its learned men, philosophers, and expert astrologers, and by what skill and art so powerful and magnificent a province is governed, as well as how their wars are conducted.

— Extract of the First Letter of Paolo Toscanelli to Columbus

It has been suggested that the man in question may have been Niccolo da Conti, who was returning from the east and is known to have met with Pope Eugenius in 1444.

In a second letter, Toscanelli describes further these men as extremely learned and willing to share their knowledge:

The said voyage is not only possible, but it is true, and certain to be honourable and to yield incalculable profit, and very great fame among all Christians. But you cannot know this perfectly save through experience and practice, as I have had in the form of the most copious and good and true information from distinguished men of great learning who have come from the said parts, here in the court of Rome, and from others being merchants who have had business for a long time in those parts, men of high authority.

— Extract of the First Letter of Paolo Toscanelli to Columbus

=== Astronomy ===
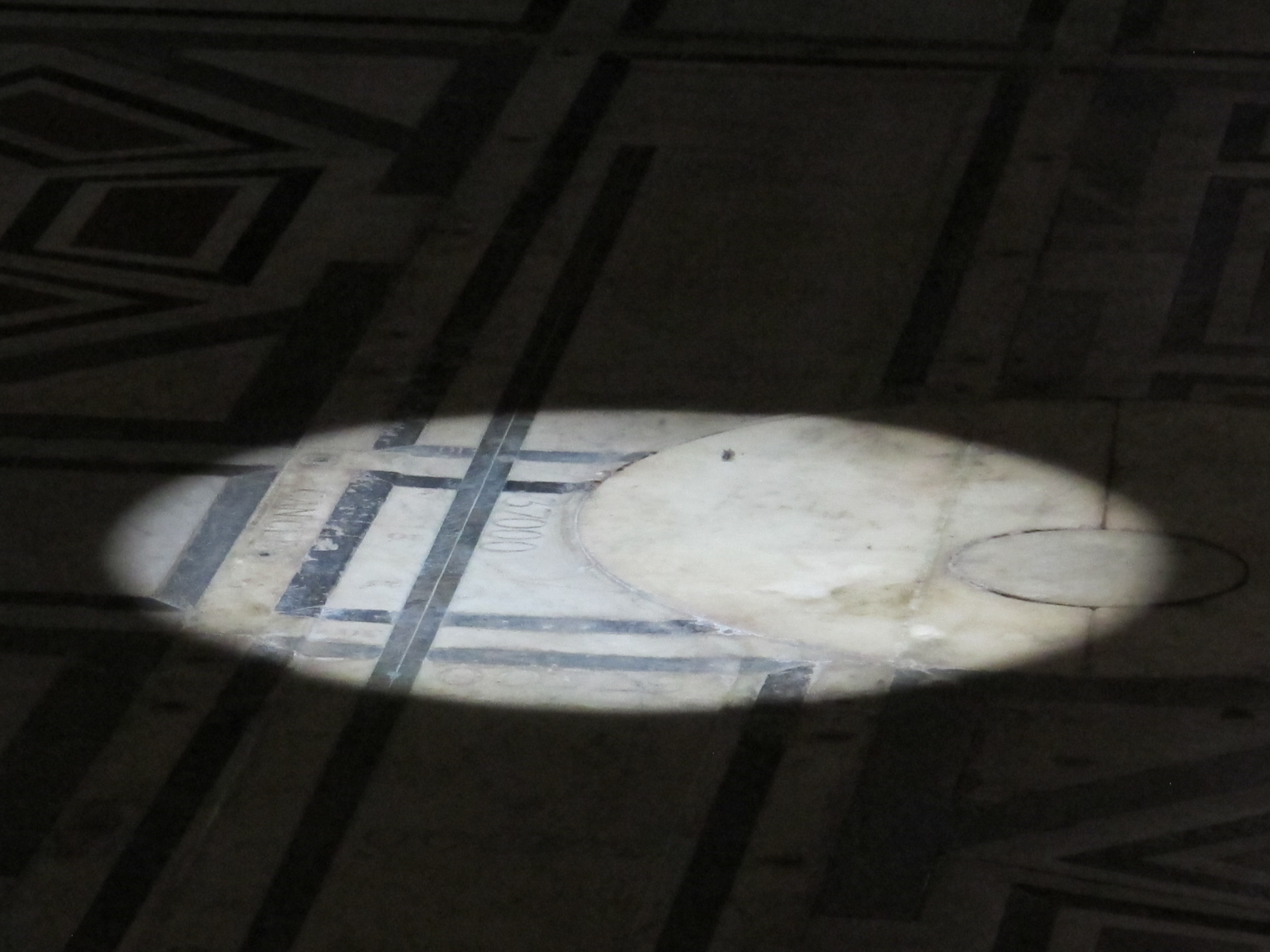
The gnomon projection on the floor of the Santa Maria del Fiore Cathedral during the solstice on 21 June 2012

Toscanelli is noted for his observations of six comets, one in 1472, two in 1457, one in 1456 (which was to be named Halley's Comet after Edmond Halley predicted its return in 1759), one in 1449, and one in 1433.

In 1475 he pierced a hole in the dome of Florence Cathedral making a gnomon at 91.05 metres (298.7 ft) above the pavement to create a meridian line. The height precluded the installation of a complete meridian line of the floor of the cathedral, but allowed a short section of approximately 10 metres (33 ft) to run between the main altar and the north wall of the transept. This allows for observation for around 35 days either side of the summer solstice.

== See also ==
- The Pinzon Brothers
- Juan de la Cosa
