= Villa di Corliano =

Coordinates: 43°46′49.81″N 10°25′43.57″E

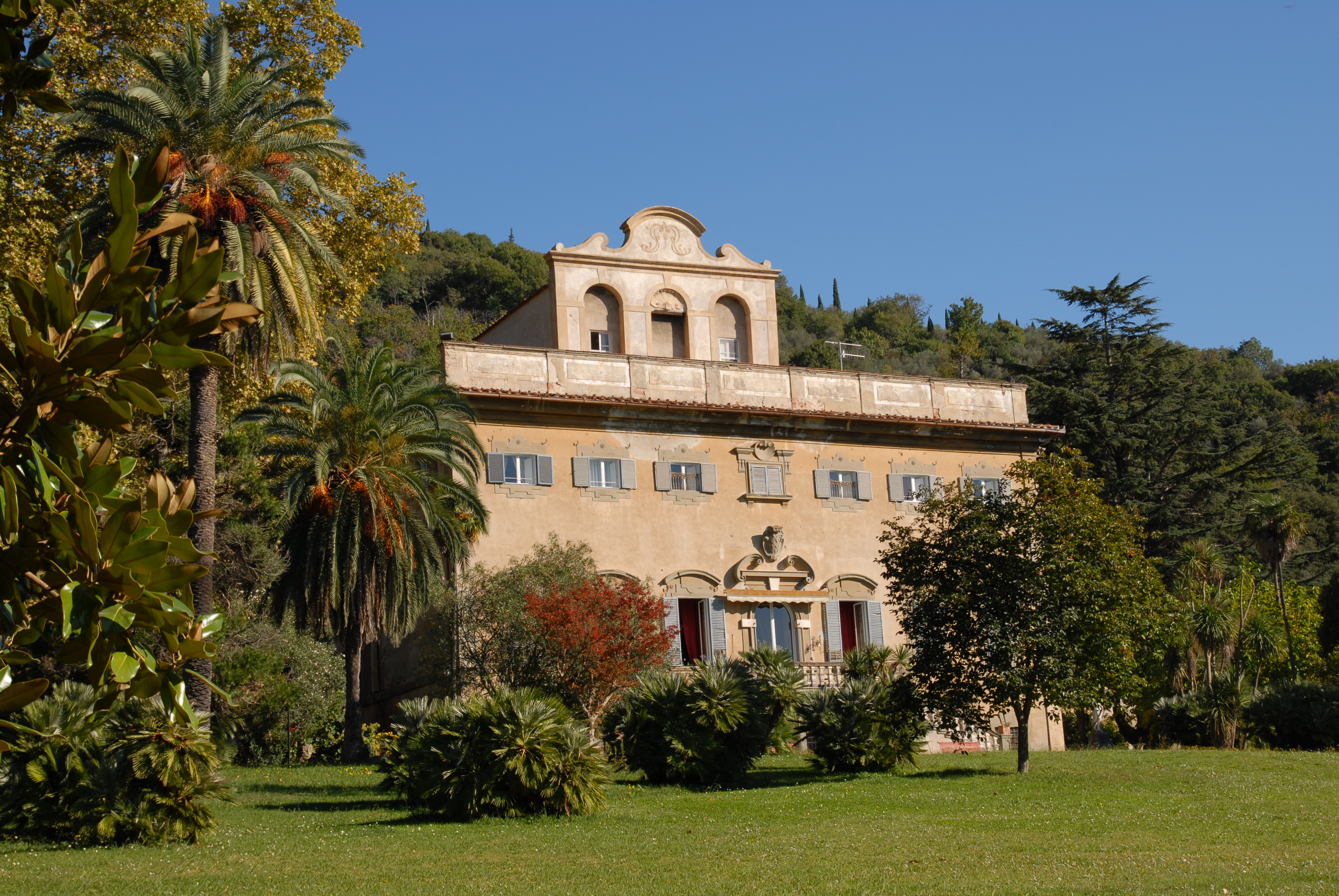
Villa di Corliano

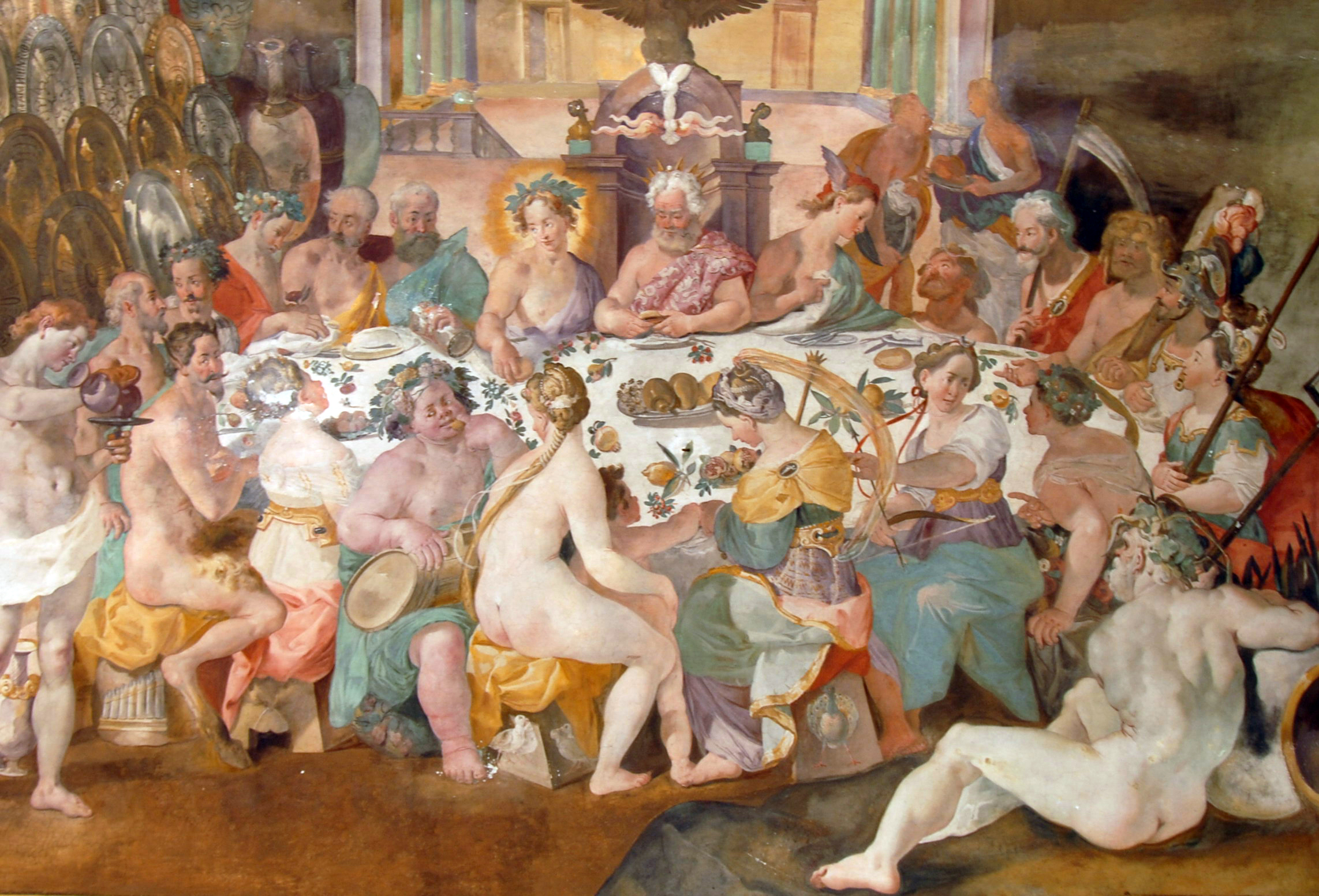
A.Boscoli, Convivio degli dei (The gods' banquet), Villa di Corliano, 1592

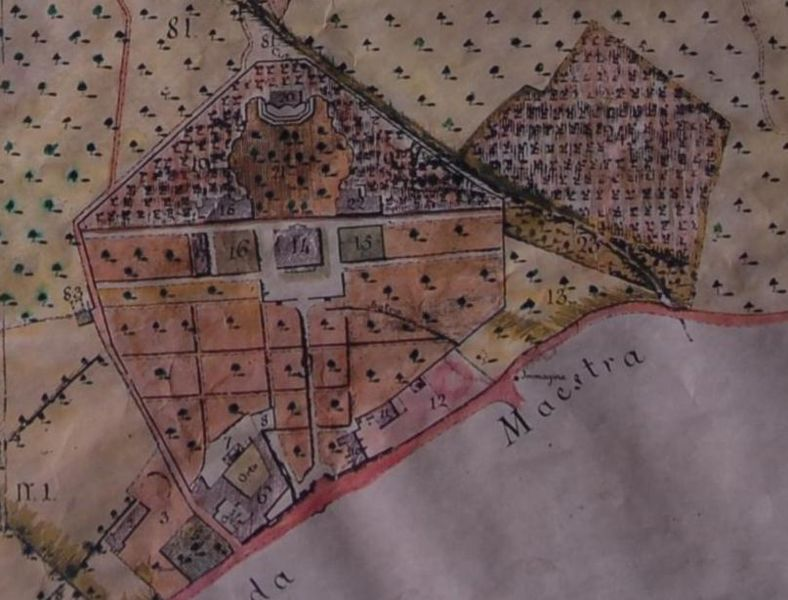
Corliano private park (1766)

The Palazzo al Borgo di Corliano is a villa situated near coast of Tuscany, central Italy, in the valley between Lucca and Pisa, 2 kilometres from the Spa town of San Giuliano Terme. It is one of the numerous villas that built by the Pisan merchants as summer houses, along the fertile west slopes of Mount Pisano.

On both sides of the villa, decorated with typical Florentine Mannerist 16th-century graffiti (harpy eagles, fruit crowns and flowers, birds and other symbols, representing the virtues of Fortress, Abundance and Fortune) are the farm and the oil mill, dating to the end of the 17th century. In 1755, on the occasion of the wedding of Maria Teresa Scolastica Ottavia della Seta Gaetani Bocca with Count Cosimo Baldassarre Agostini Fantini Venerosi, the villa was restored by the Veronese architect Ignazio Pellegrini.

In the vestibule there are some 18th-century marble busts representing Roman Emperors, while the vault is painted with a mythological scene representing Paris awarding Venus the fruit, under the watchful June and Minerva's stare. In the lateral ovals there are the Cathedral Square of Pisa, the original view of the villa, Piana della Croce Mount (Apuan Alps), the Gulf of Lerici, two unknown castles and the commissioners' portraits. In the central hall is a vault, with a fresco representing The Gods' Banquet and months and zodiacal signs allegorical representations, by the Florentine painter Andrea Boscoli. On the walls are 18th-century fresco paintings with the Four Seasons, attributed to Natili and Matraini, as are the ones in the little church.

The 4 hectares private park has been changed several times in the centuries, according to the different age's trends. The current garden layout is from the 19th century.

Corliano belongs to a wider estate complex constituted by the ancient villa, the aristocratic chapel, the farm, the oil mill, stables, the kaffeehaus, the park, rural annexes, the boundary wall and monumental entrance, which was under control due to its historical-artistic interest pursuant to Italian Laws.
