= Santo Stefano a Pozzolatico =

Roman Catholic church in Impruneta, Tuscany, Italy

Coordinates: 43°43′28.4″N 11°14′39.0″E

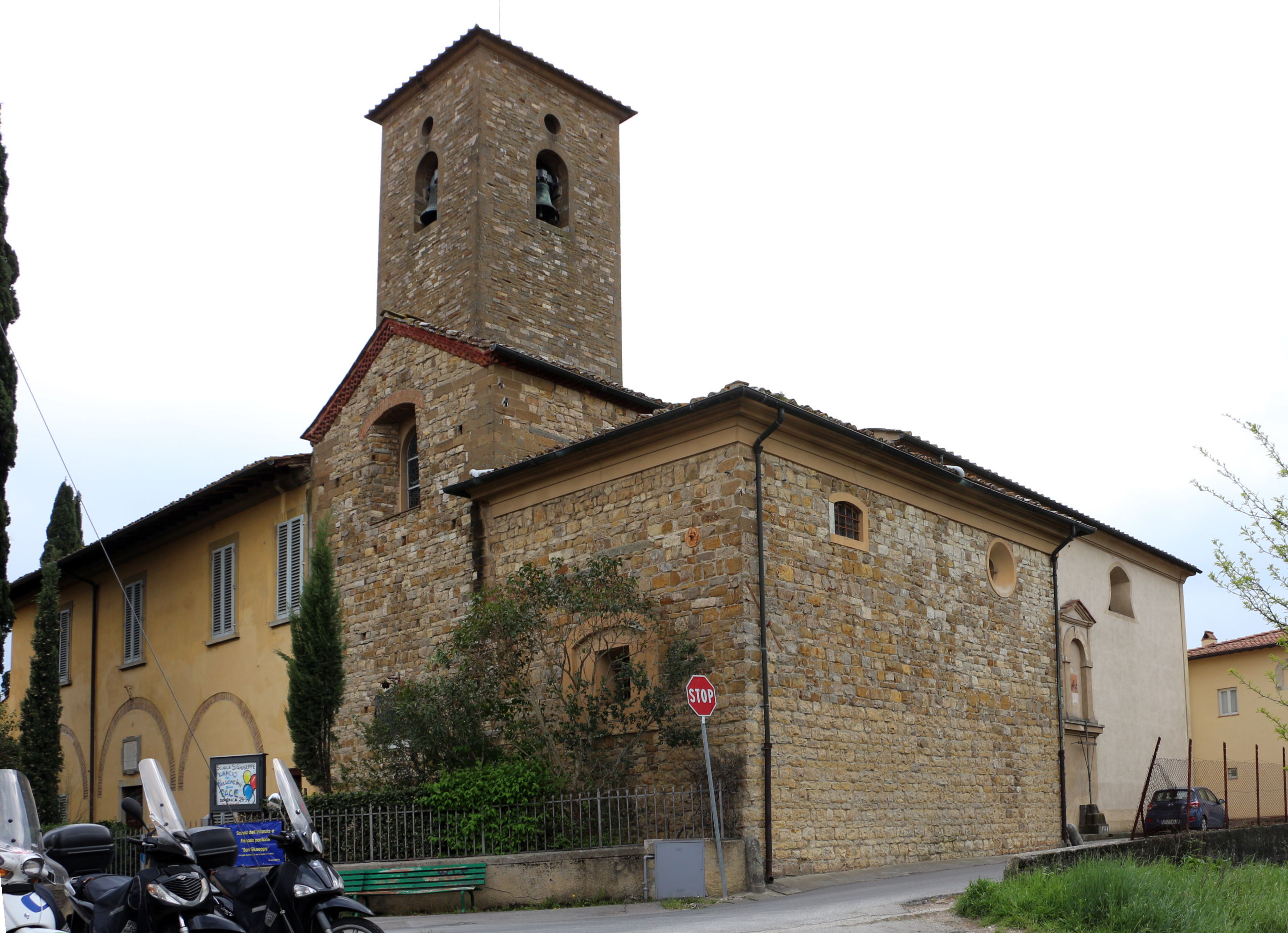
Apse of church with medieval bell-tower

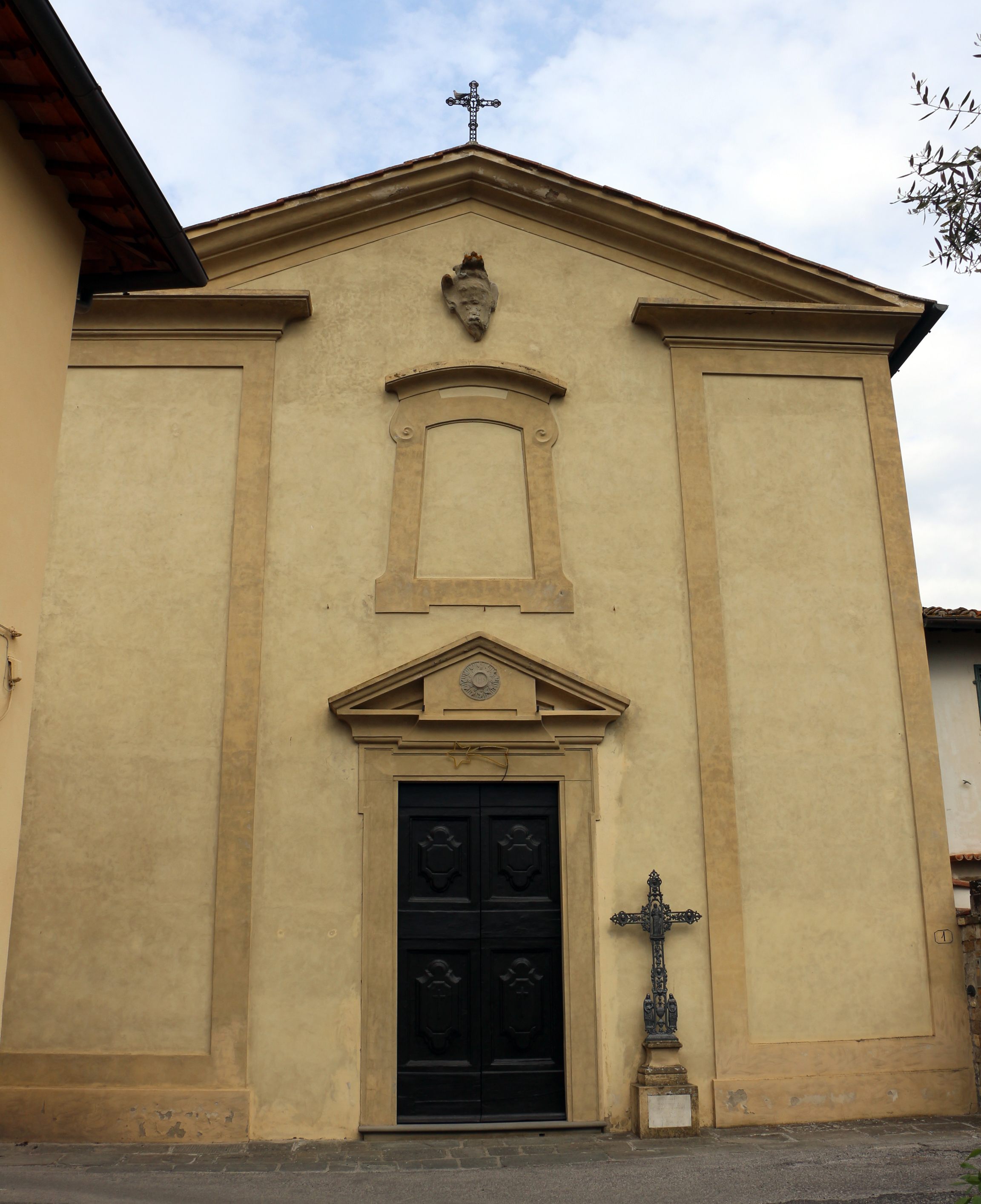
Facade of church

Santo Stefano a Pozzolatico is a Roman Catholic church on Via di Riboia #3 in the neighborhood of Pozzolatico within the town limits of Impruneta, but just north of the Autostrade del Sole circumvaling Florence, and in the province encompassed by the metropolitan city of Florence, region of Tuscany, Italy.

== History ==
A church at the site is mentioned by 11th and 12th centuries, and appeared to minister to Christian pilgrims. It was variably patronized by the church of Santa Maria all'Impruneta, then later by a number of prominent Florentine families, including the Ricci who added a dedication of the church to Saint Caterina de' Ricci. The bell-tower dates to the 14th century, but the present church building was rebuilt later in a Baroque style.

Among the works in the church is an altarpiece (first on left) of the Madonna and Child painted in the style of Agnolo Gaddi; the second altar on right has a Madonna and Child with young St John the Baptist and Saints Cosimo and Damian (1632) by Alessandro Allori. The second altar on the right houses a Madonna delle Grazie by Jacopo del Casentino.
