= Villa Menichetti =

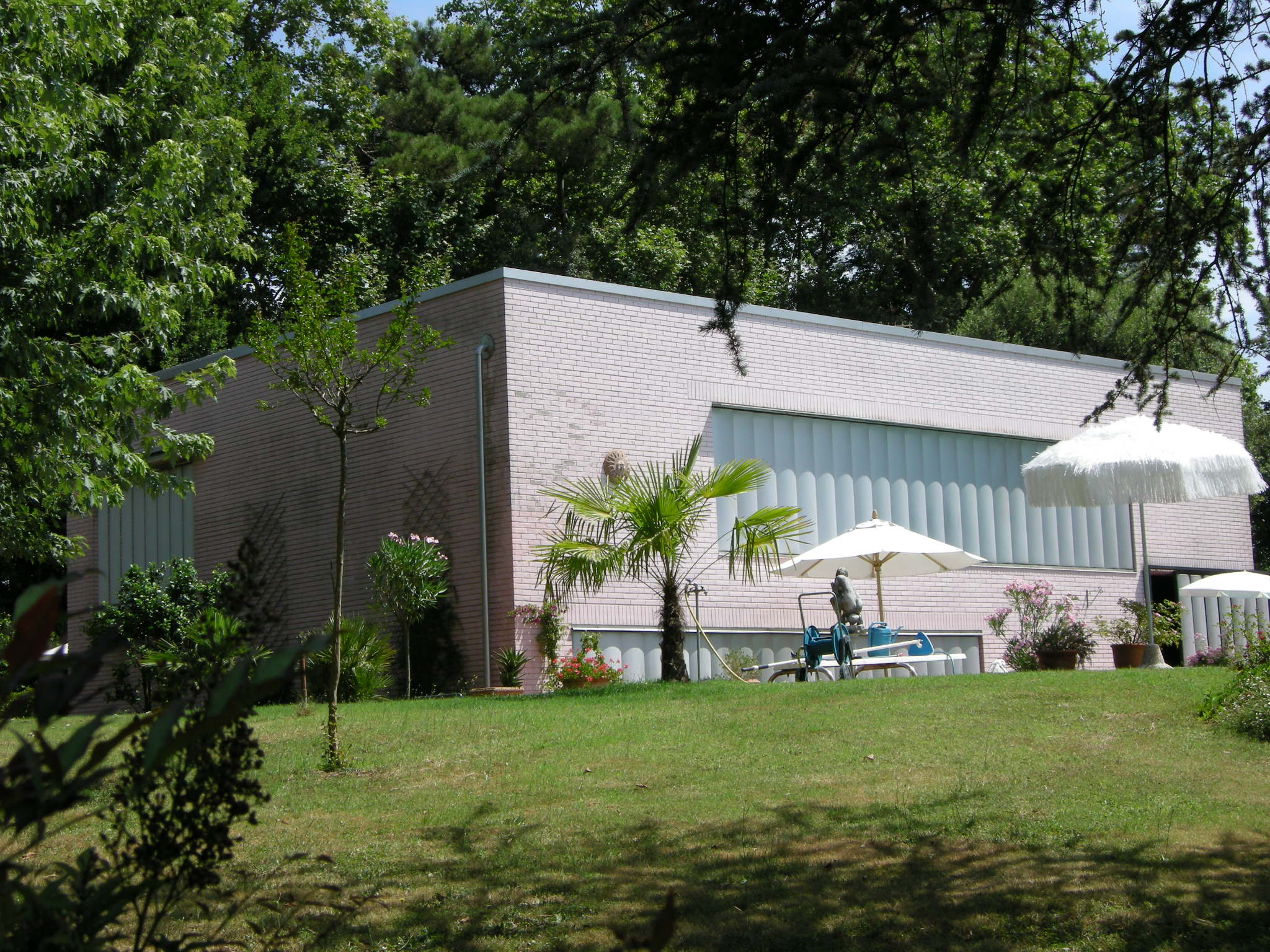
- Villa Menichetti
- Interactive map of the Villa Menichetti area

General information
- Location: via Piana, 210

Design and construction
- Architect: Piero Menichetti

Villa Menichetti is a stately home located at via Piana, 210 (in the Second Traverse) in the Sant'Alessio area of Lucca.

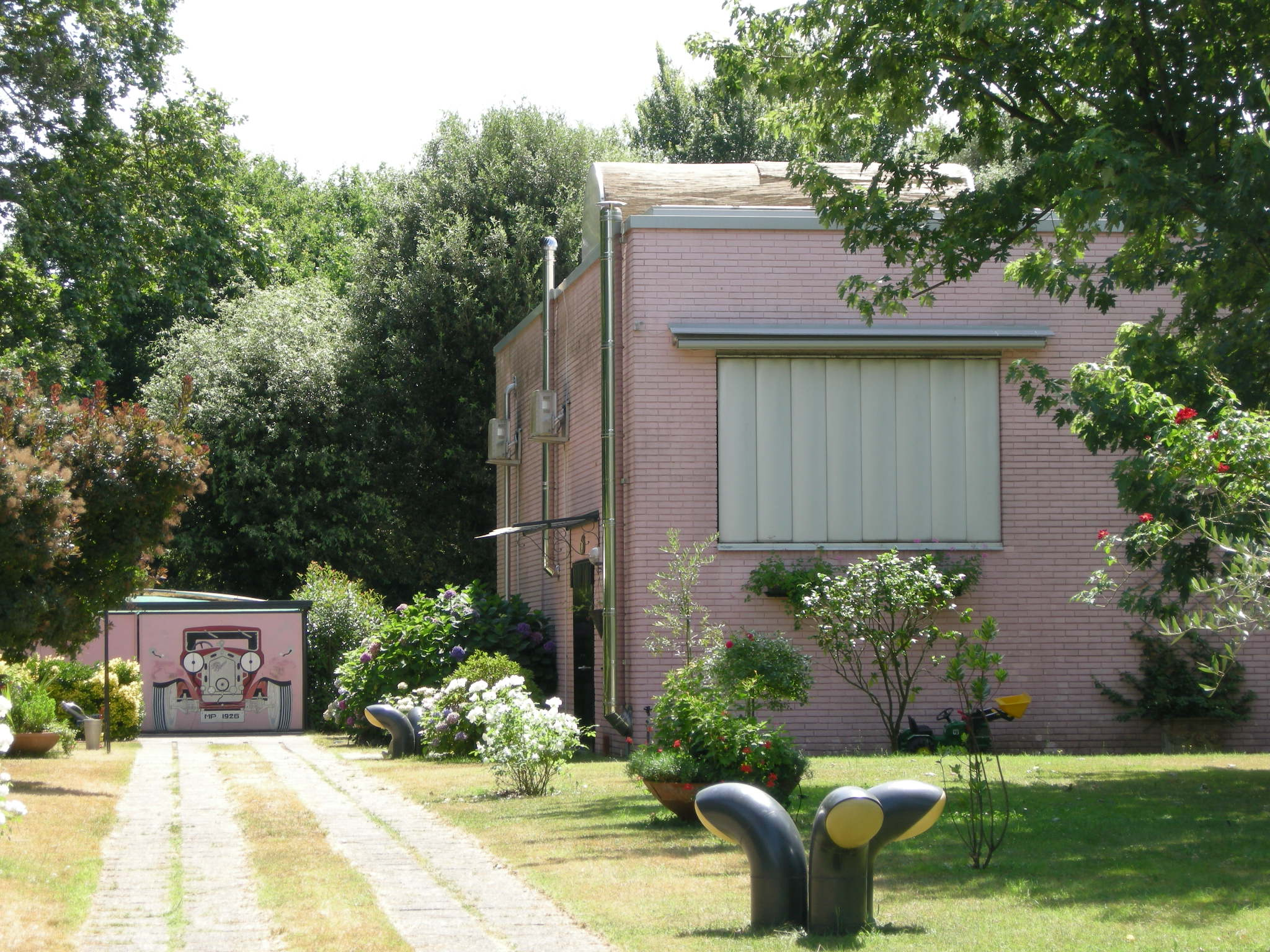
Villa Menichetti

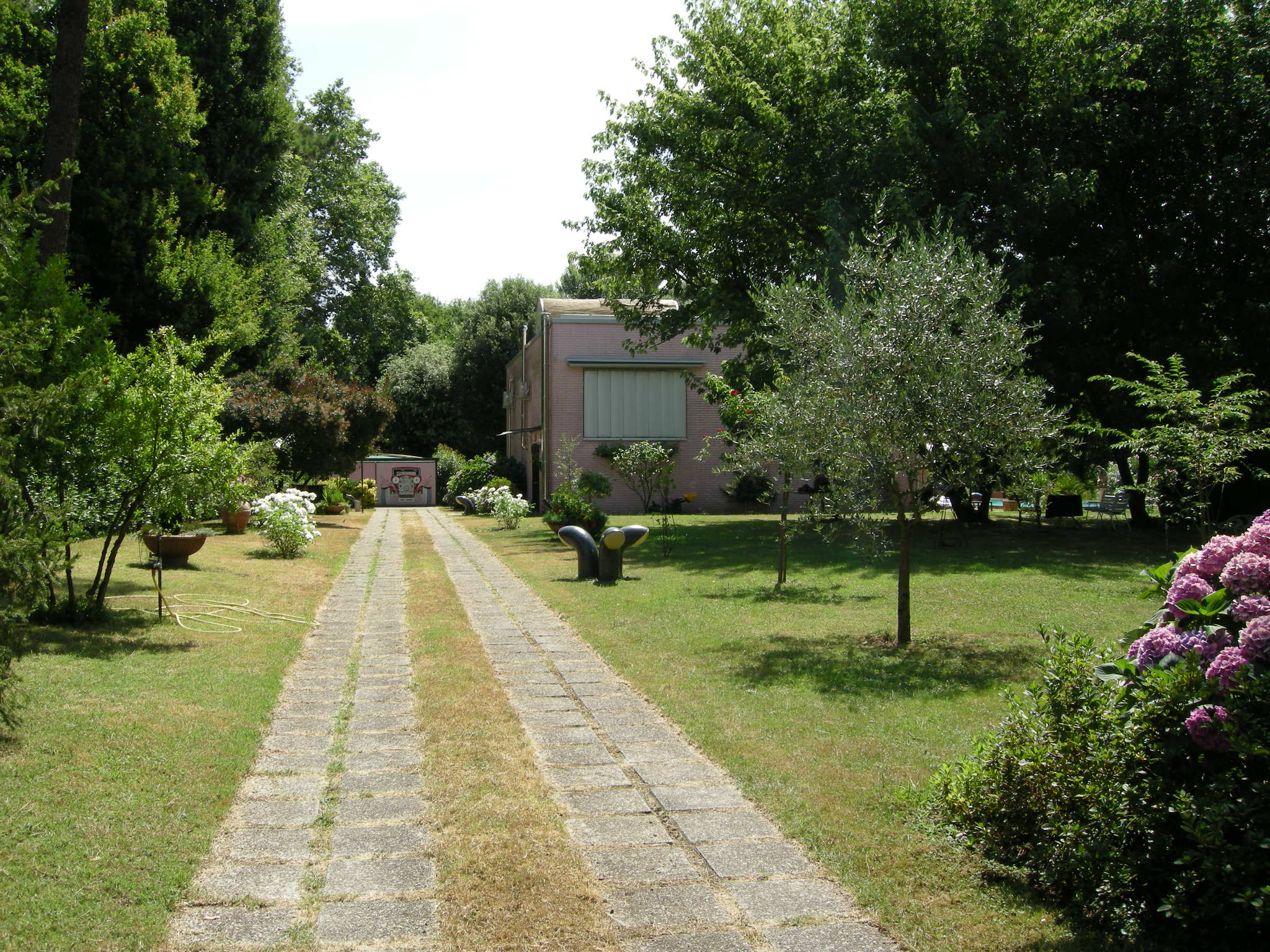
Garden

The house is situated on a low hill, surrounded by a countryside rich in historic villas. Of the three floors that constitute it, only the top one is completely above ground and is used for residence, while the one below, intended to house the studio, is semi-basement. The remaining floor, completely underground, hosts a laboratory, a recreational space, and various technical and accessory rooms.

== History ==
The villa was built in 1969–70 to a design by the designer Piero Menichetti as his own house-studio and soon became a sort of exemplification of the author's ideas and design proposals, thanks, on one hand, to the attention from industry magazines and, in the Lucca area, to the close and productive relationship the author maintained with local productive sectors and various local companies.

Of particular interest were some distributive and interior solutions, effectively rendered here, from which some local companies drew new impetus, as in the case of the colored cement tiles for the living area floor, in production since the end of the last century and again widespread since then.

== Critical reception ==
The house presents itself "as a brick parallelepiped like the houses of Lucchese farmers, but painted pink-farmer-house", with the essential difference that "the aluminum brise-soleil, 40 cm, brutally out of scale with the brick pattern, is a clear and definite "no" to any possible vernacular allusion." Regarding the interior spaces, the same article notes how "the discovery of rules and details of amusing inventions continues among function-objects, bathroom-cells, framing of abstract panoramas, recomposed and sliced in the brise-soleil grid."

== Architecture ==
The perimeter wall hides the very low-sloped roof with a cover made of copper sheets on a supporting structure of steel trusses. Additionally, the perimeter wall hides two uncovered internal courtyards. The larger one, on the northeast corner, hosts the external stairs leading to the house and studio, sheltered with curved plexiglass sheets on a steel structure. The remaining part of the courtyard is green. On the northeast side, there is a smaller courtyard intended as a garden, also equipped for the laundry area on the basement floor.

The north front has only a black-painted iron gate, through which one accesses the larger courtyard, and a continuous vertical aluminum window. The east and west facades show a squared opening high off the ground, closed only with vertical aluminum panels that function as brise-soleil and open towards the respective courtyards. On the south front, this type of closure has a greater development, serving as movable shutters for the aluminum window of the living room. Still on the south front, there is a similar window, low to the ground, for the studio area. Opposite the south front is a pool with the same height and length measurements as this front, being, in Menichetti's intentions, homologous to the front.

The interior, intended for residence, is articulated on a free plan. The bedroom is raised and separated from the living room by a low prefabricated wall. The bathroom is partly covered with Impruneta tiles, mirrored, with the design echoed by elastic polyurethane shelves-benches. The sink is embedded in a cabinet covered with white-pink striped print designed by Menichetti himself.

The kitchen is almost open to the living room except for a long striped print cabinet at human height, containing all necessary elements. The floors, excluding the bedroom and bathroom, are made of hexagonal cement tiles in black and white representing a geometric trompe-l'œil design depicting a cube, produced since the beginning of the century by a company in Lucca.

The dining table, made of wood, with chairs inspired by Mackintosh, are made to Menichetti's own design as well as the "Tumbo" floor lamp, made in the 70s for Ismos by the Sartoni brothers, a leading Italian outdoor lighting company of the time.

The entire apartment has a suspended ceiling with fir wood planks. The studio is located one meter below ground level and is, like every other room in the villa, unplastered, with exposed brickwork as outside. The floor of this room is tiled. The basement floor, partly carpeted and partly tiled with gres, remains shrouded in semi-darkness due to the presence of only a few horizontal light openings.

== Bibliography ==
- P. Riani, A pink house in the Lucca countryside, in "Casa Vogue", no. 50, 1975.
