= San Lorenzo alle Rose =

Church in Impruneta, Italy

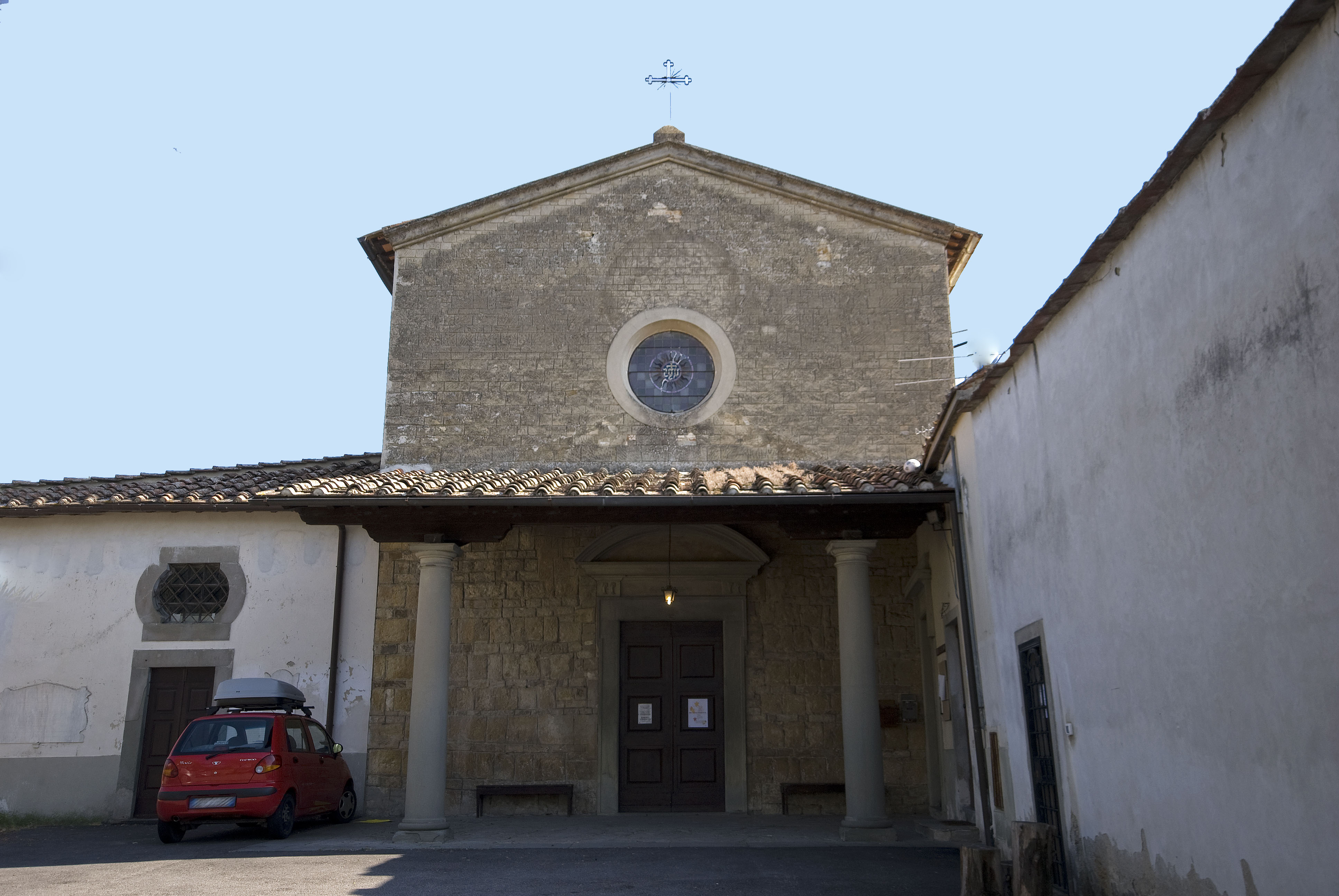
- Façade of the church.

Religion
- Affiliation: Roman Catholic
- Province: Florence

Location
- Location: Impruneta, Italy
- Interactive map of San Lorenzo alle Rose
- Coordinates: 43°42′50″N 11°13′42″E

Architecture
- Type: Church
- Style: Romanesque
- Groundbreaking: 11c

San Lorenzo alle Rose is a Romanesque-style, Roman Catholic church located on Vicolo Rose #7 in Impruneta, in the region of the Metropolitan city of Florence, Italy.

== History ==
A church at the site was founded around the year 1000; the facade is a rough stone and brick. The meaning of the suffix alle Rose is unclear; it may reflect the flora of the site or the early patronage of the Rossi family, landowners in the region. The church was later patronized by the Grifoni family.

The church has undergone numerous refurbishments, and lost much of the original Romanesque style. The facade has a portico with Tuscan columns. The main altarpiece is a 16th-century Annunciation with Saints attributed to the Maestro di Serumido. The lateral stone altars added at that time included altarpieces depicting San Nicola di Bari (1596) by Andrea Boscoli and Saints Dominic and Catherine by Francesco Curradi. A Madonna and Child by Taddeo Gaddi is now in a lateral chapel to the left of the presbytery.

== Gallery ==
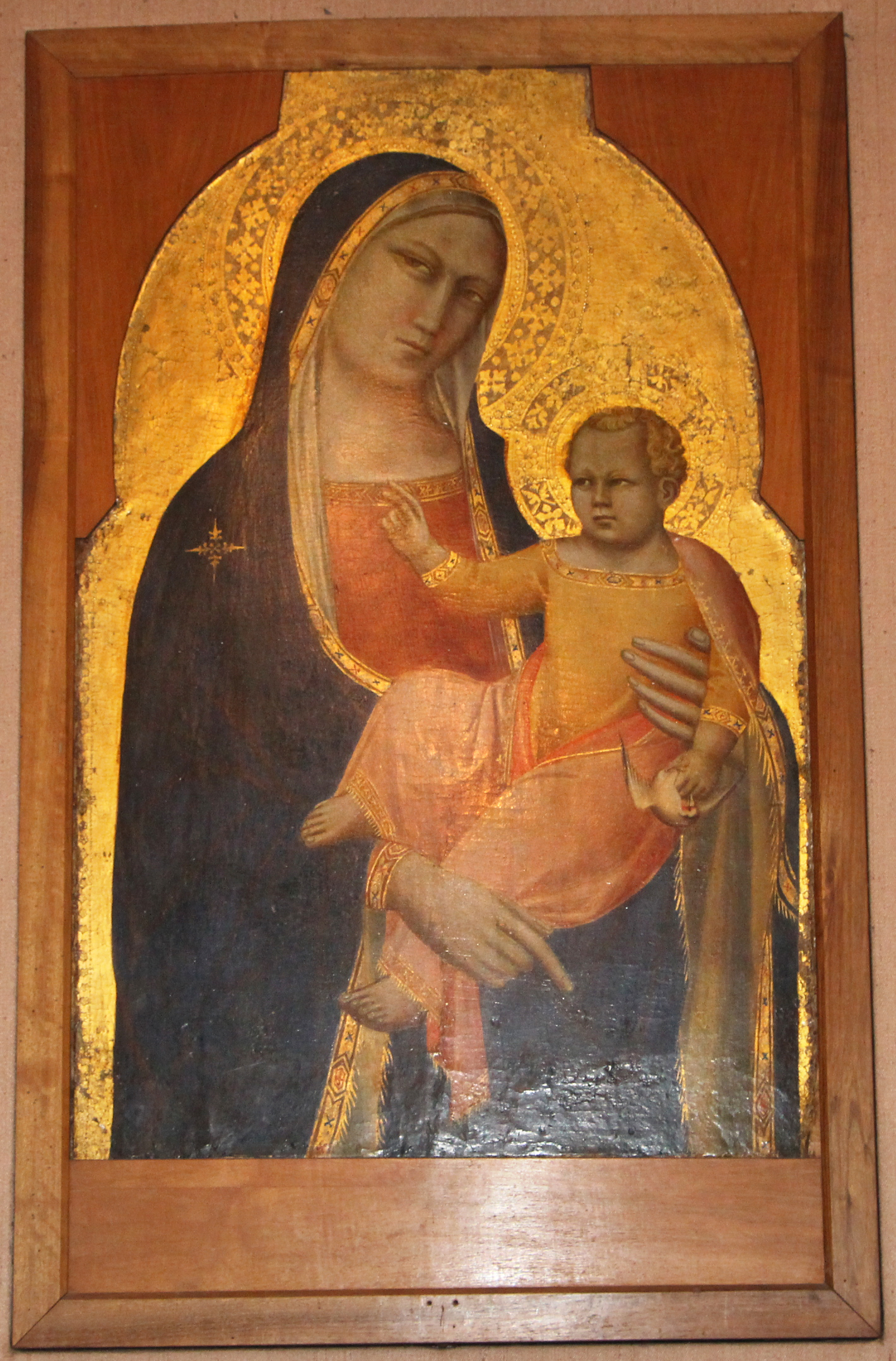
Taddeo Gaddi altarpiece

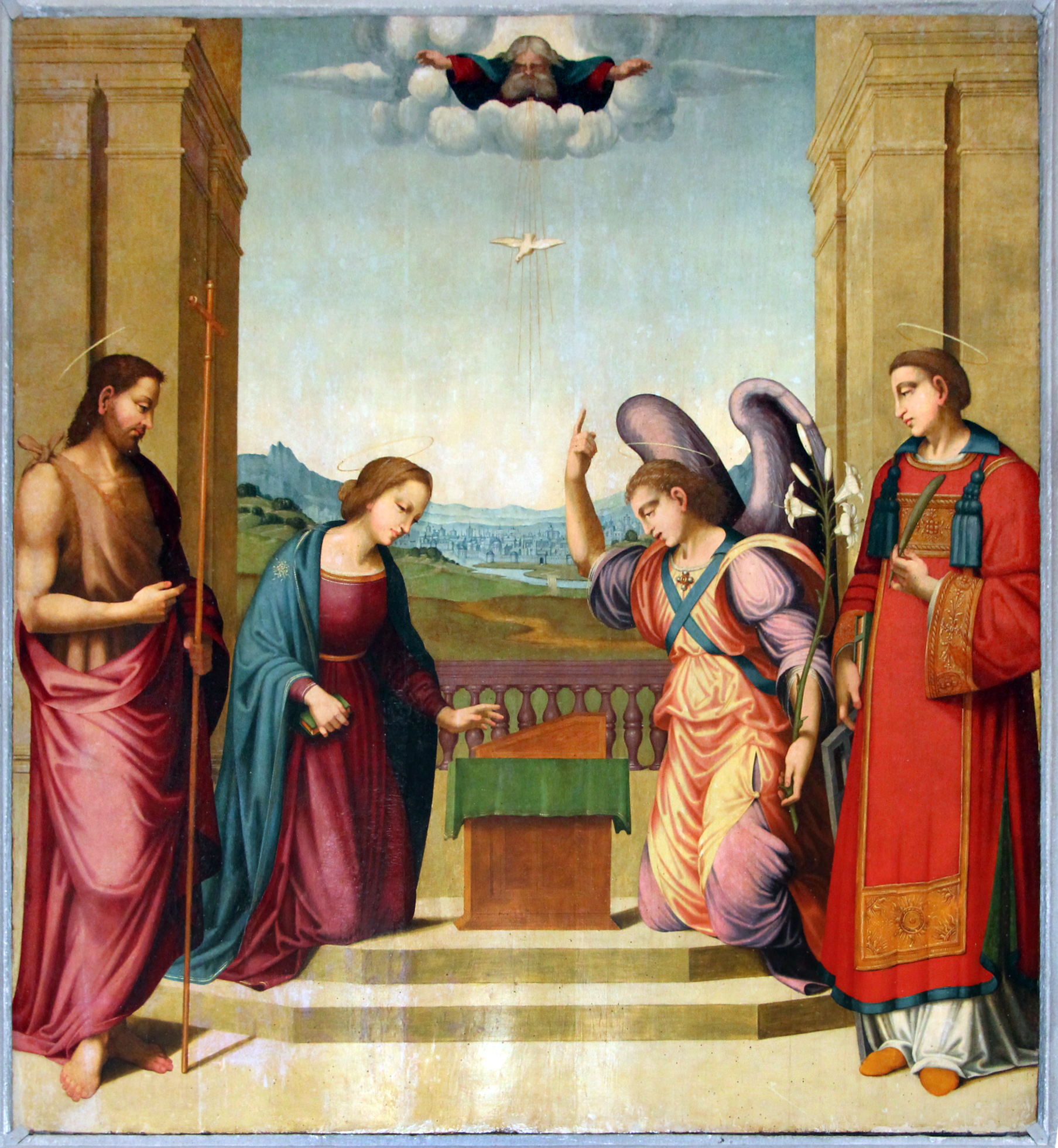
Maestro di Serumido altarpiece

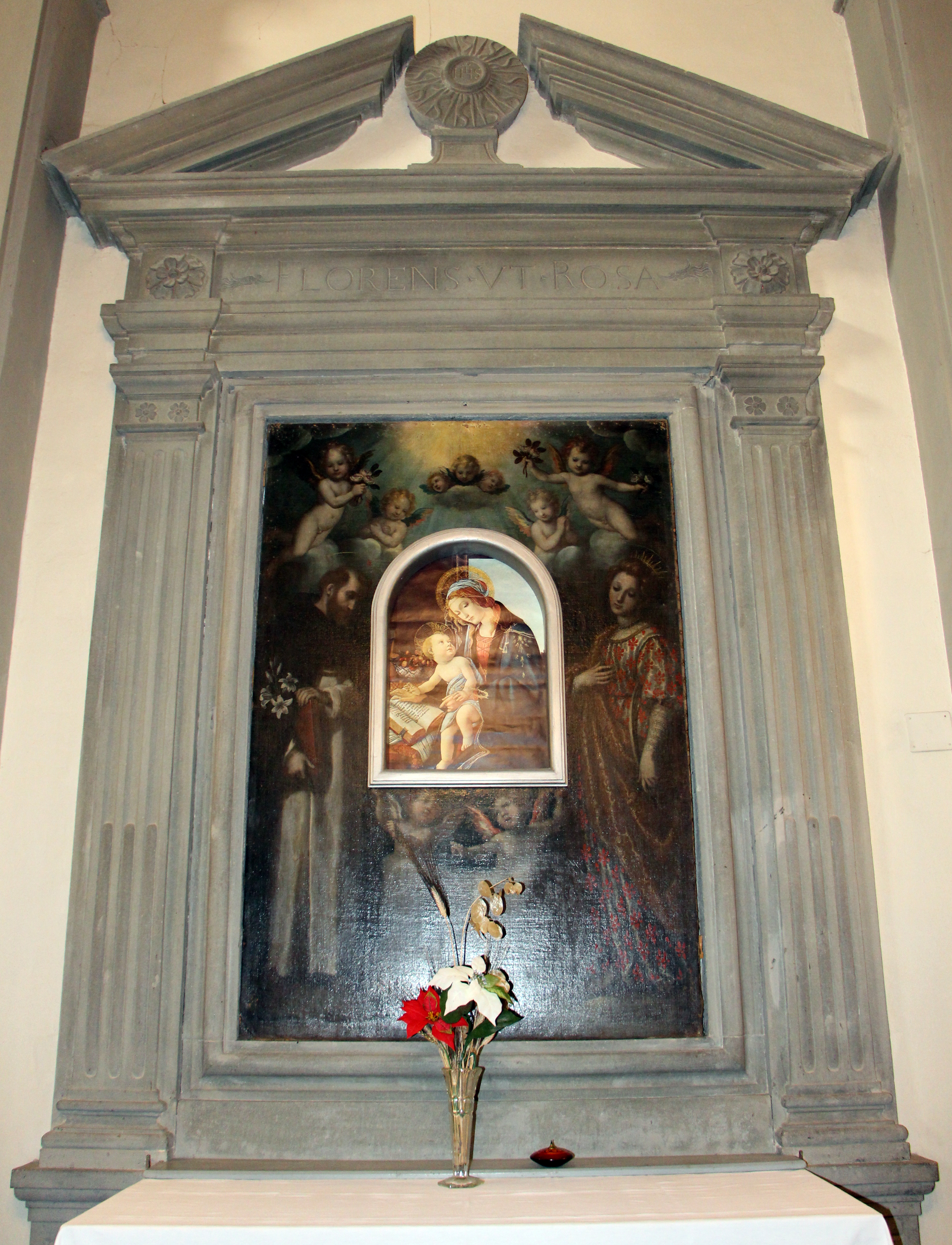
Francesco Curradi altarpiece

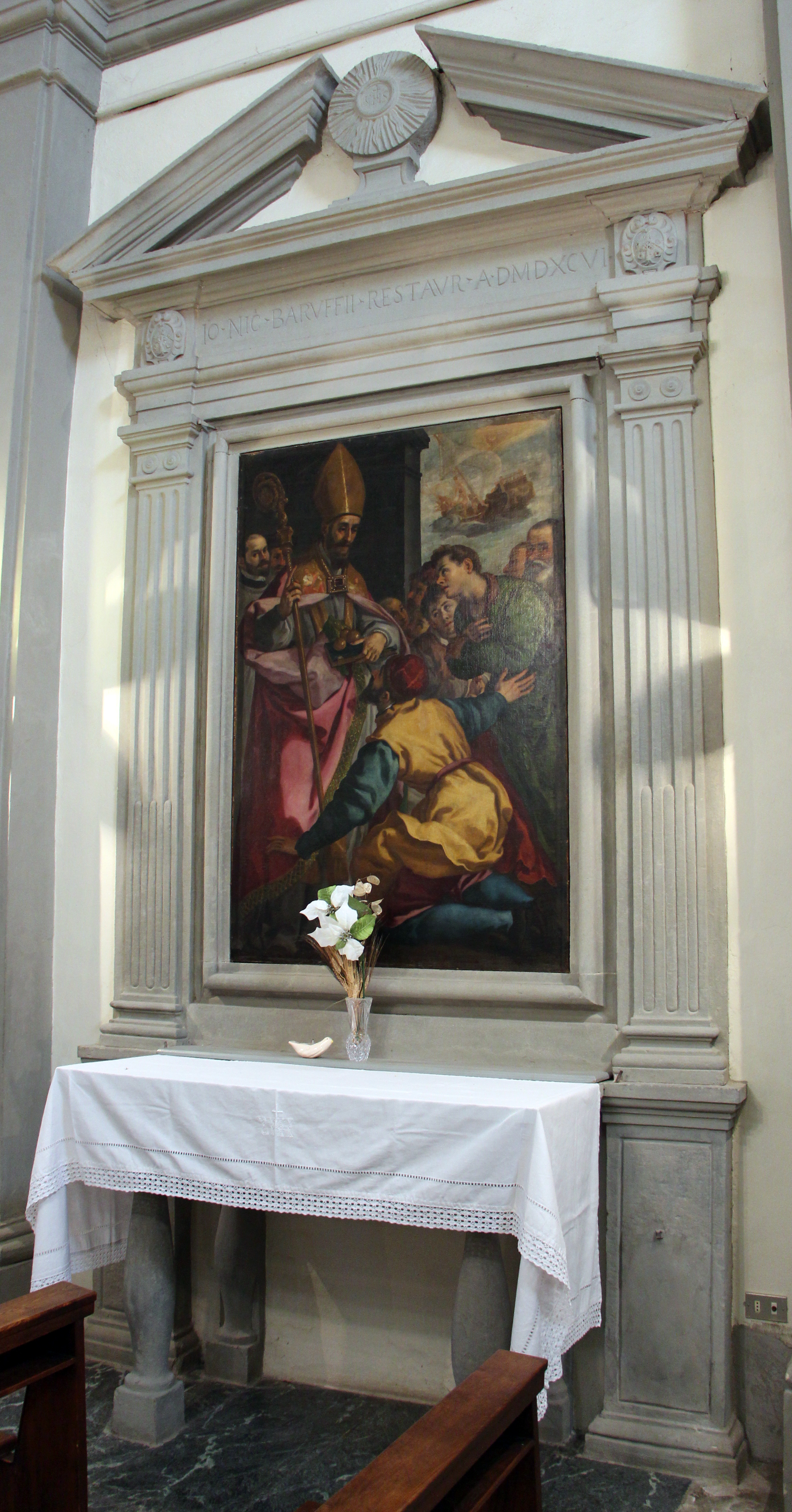
Andrea Boscoli altarpiece
