= Elpidius the Cappadocian =

Abbot and saint

Saint Elpidius the Cappadocian
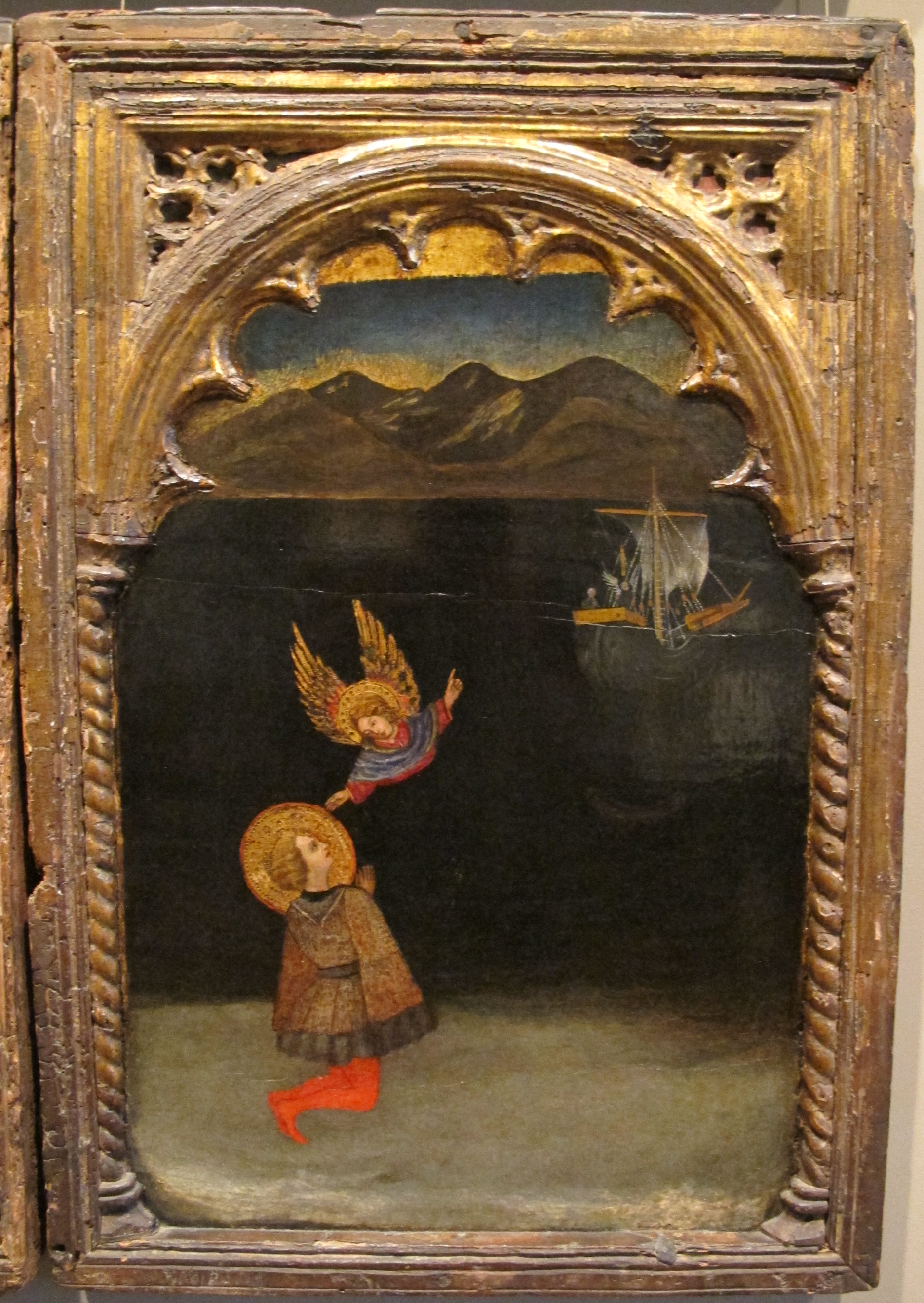
- Died: 4th century
- Venerated in: Roman Catholic Church
- Major shrine: Sant'Elpidio a Mare
- Feast: September 2
- Attributes: vine in leaf in winter

Saint Elpidius the Cappadocian (Italian: Sant'Elpidio, Santo Abate Elpidio) (4th century) was an abbot and saint of Asia Minor. Tradition states that he lived in a cave in Cappadocia for twenty-five years. Disciples, such as Eustace (Eustachio) and Ennesius (Ennesio), gathered around him.

== Veneration ==
The village of Cluana, in Marche, acquired Elpidius' relics in the 7th century in exchange for the donation of a piece of land. The relics of Elpidius and his companions Eustace and Ennesius were consigned to the local inhabitants, and the town later acquired the new name of Sant'Elpidio a Mare. The relics of Elpidius are considered to have saved the town from a Lombard siege; tradition states that the saint appeared in the sky asking the inhabitants to defend the village.
