= Impruneta =

- Comune
- Comune di Impruneta
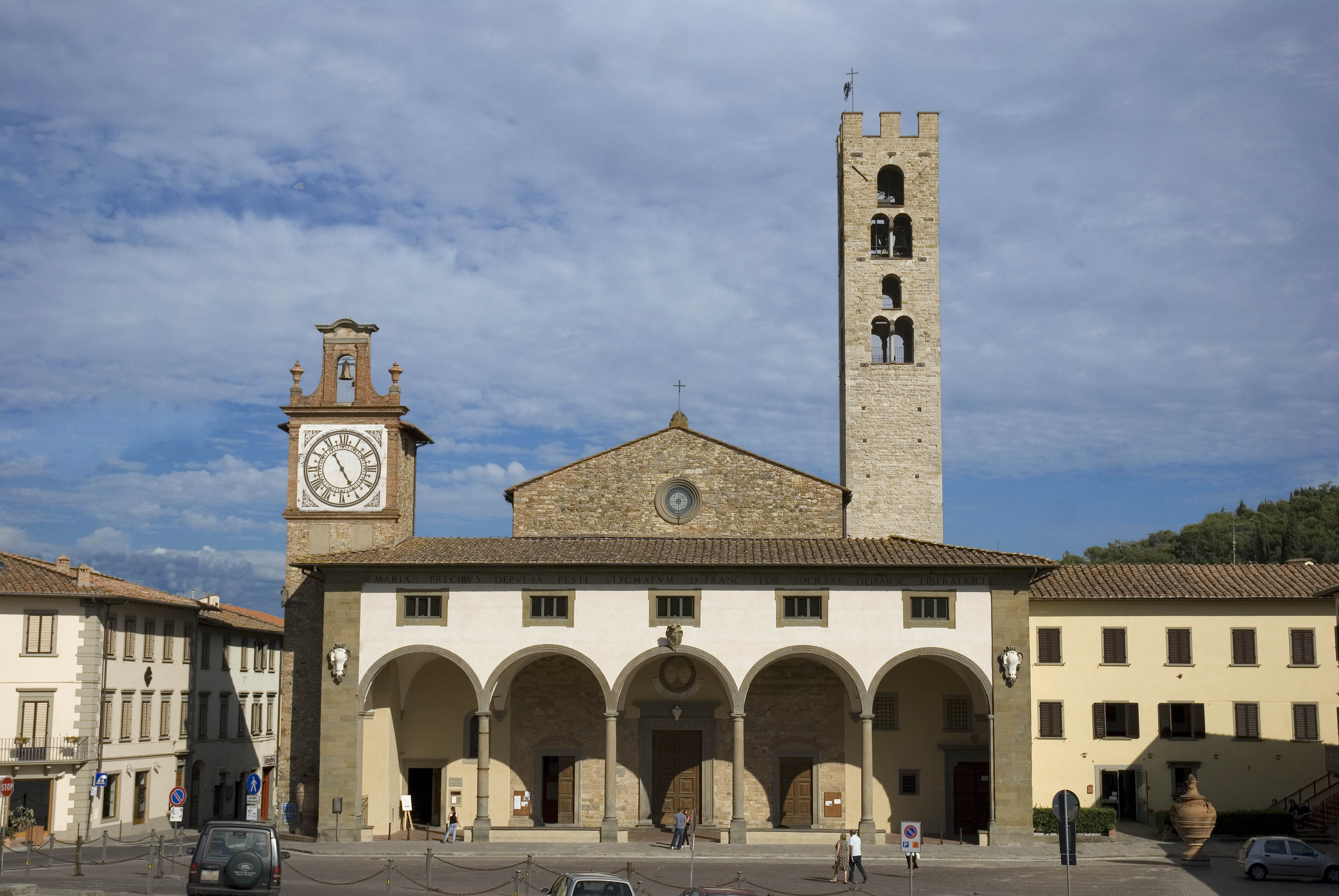
- Basilica of Impruneta

- Coat of arms

- Location within Italy Location within Tuscany
- Coordinates: 43°41′N 11°15′E
- Country: Italy
- Region: Tuscany
- Metropolitan city: Florence (FI)
- Frazioni: Abate, Bagnolo, Bagnolo - Cantagallo, Baruffi, Borgaccio, Borgo di Sopra, Bottai, Codaccio, Collegramole Case Nuove, Colline, Convento di San Paolo, Fabbiolle, Falciani, Il Ferrone, Il Pino, Invalidi di Guerra, La Casina, Le Rose, L'Ugolino, Mezzomonte, Monte Oriolo, Pozzolatico, Presura, Ravanella, Riboia, San Gersolè, San Gersolè - Torre Rosse, San Lorenzo alle Rose, Sant'Isidoro, Suore Domenicane, Tavarnuzze, Terme di Firenze

Government
  - Mayor: Alessio Calamandrei (since May 28, 2013) (Partito Democratico)

Area
  - Total: 48 km^{2} (19 sq mi)
- Elevation: 275 m (902 ft)

Population (31 August 2007)
  - Total: 14,778
  - Density: 310/km^{2} (800/sq mi)
- Demonym: Imprunetini
- Time zone: UTC+1 (CET)
  - Summer (DST): UTC+2 (CEST)
- Postal code: 50023
- Dialing code: 055
- Patron saint: St. Luke the Evangelist
- Saint day: October 18
- Website: Official website

Impruneta is a town and comune of the Metropolitan City of Florence, in the Italian region of Tuscany. The population is about 15,000.

== Name and production ==
The name Impruneta is derived from in pineta meaning 'within the pine woods', and is known for its fine production of terracotta. The terracotta is made from local clay, has a red-colored finish, and production includes everything from small tiles to large garden vases and statues.

== Main sights ==
The most important feature of Impruneta is the Sanctuary of Santa Maria. The Basilica dates from 1060, being probably located over an ancient devotional site of Etruscan times (6th century BC). It was an important site of pilgrimage during the Middle Ages.

The basilica was bombed during World War II and now few of the original decorations can be seen. The façade is preceded by a portico by Gherardo Silvani (1634), built by the Florentine people as vow for the liberation from the plague, and by a bell tower from the 13th century. The interior has a single nave; artworks include a Nativity by Domenico Passignano and a Vocation of St. Peter by Jacopo da Empoli. The presbytery is flanked by two niches by Michelozzo decorated by Luca della Robbia, housing the relics of the Holy Cross and the Madonna's image to which the sanctuary is devoted and, which, according to tradition, was painted by St. Luke himself.

The museum connected to the basilica is home to one of the oldest-known pieces of European patchwork quilt, a cushion dating from the late 14th or early 15th centuries. The cushion belonged to Bishop Antonio degli Agli, priest in charge of Santa Maria dell'Impruneta from 1439 to his death in 1477, and was found in his tomb after the church was damaged by an Allied bomb in 1944.

The current Madonna's image is a heavy restoration by Ignazio Hugford from 1758.

Also in Impruneta are the churches of San Lorenzo alle Rose and Santo Stefano a Pozzolatico.

== Town saint ==
The town's saint is St. Luke and the saint's feast day on 18 October each year is the highlight of a week-long festival with a Palio featuring horse racing a carnival and fireworks.

== Twin towns ==
Impruneta is twinned with:

- Prachatice, Czech Republic
- Bellerive-sur-Allier, France
- Hadamar, Germany
- Pruszków, Poland

== Notable residents ==
- Ermanno Picchi (1811–1856), composer, pedagogue and music critic
- Alessandro Pieroni (1550–1607), architect and painter
- Gustavo Uzielli (1839–1911), geologist, historian and scientist
- Marco Masini (born 1964), singer-songwriter and pianist
