= Edoardo Pacini =

Italian footballer (born 1991)

Personal information
- Date of birth: 4 August 1991 (age 35)
- Place of birth: Sant'Elpidio a Mare, Italy
- Position: Right winger

Team information
- Current team: Teramo (on loan from Parma)

Youth career
- Ascoli

Senior career*
Years	Team	Apps	(Gls)
2011	Salernitana	6	(0)
2012	Treviso	1	(0)
2012–2013	Bellaria	9	(0)
2013–	Parma	0	(0)
2013–	Teramo		

International career
2011	Italy U20	1	(0)
- * Club domestic league appearances and goals as of 22 August 2013

Edoardo Pacini (born 4 August 1991) is an Italian footballer who plays for Italian four division club Teramo, on loan from Parma.

== Biography ==
Born in Sant'Elpidio a Mare, Marche, Pacini started his career at Marche side Ascoli. In summer 2011 he left for Serie D club Salernitana. However, he was released on 16 December 2011. On 7 February 2012 he was presented as a new player of Lega Pro Seconda Divisione team Treviso. In summer 2012 he was signed by Bellaria.
