= Sant'Elpidio a Mare =

- Comune
- Comune di Sant'Elpidio a Mare
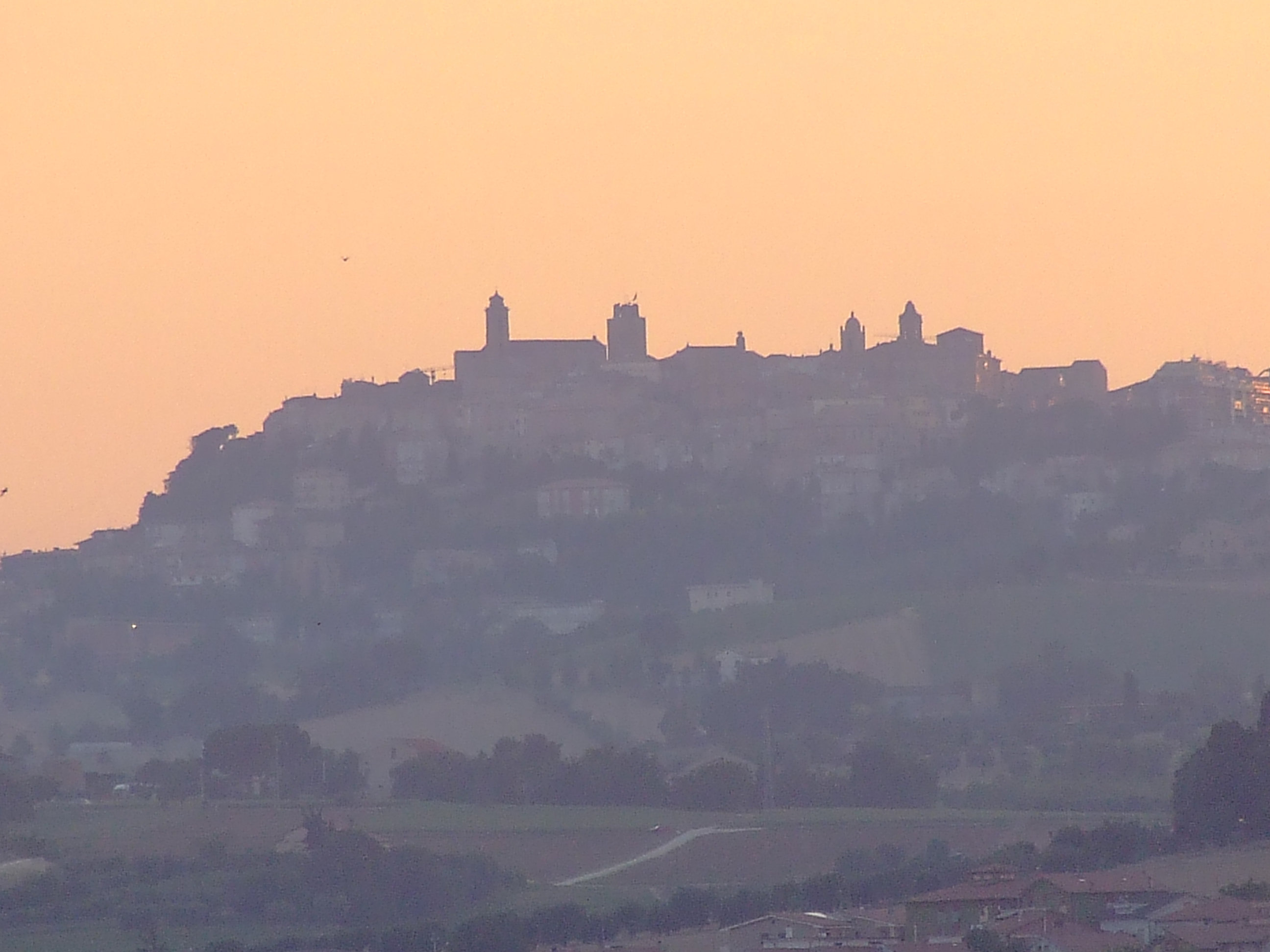
- View of the town

- Coat of arms

- Location within Italy Location within Marche
- Coordinates: 43°14′N 13°41′E
- Country: Italy
- Region: Marche
- Province: Fermo (FM)
- Frazioni: Casette d'Ete, Cascinare, Bivio Cascinare, Castellano, Luce, Cretarola

Government
  - Mayor: Alessio Terrenzi

Area
  - Total: 50.52 km^{2} (19.51 sq mi)
- Elevation: 257 m (843 ft)

Population (31 December 2016)
  - Total: 17,073
  - Density: 337.9/km^{2} (875.3/sq mi)
- Demonym: Elpidiensi
- Time zone: UTC+1 (CET)
  - Summer (DST): UTC+2 (CEST)
- Postal code: 63811
- Dialing code: 0734
- Patron saint: Saint Elpidius
- Saint day: September 2
- Website: Official website

Sant'Elpidio a Mare is a town and comune in the province of Fermo, in the Marche region of Italy.

== Geography ==
Sant'Elpidio a Mare is located on a ridge of Marche Apennine, elevation 251 metres (823 ft) above sea level, between the lower river valleys of the river Tenna and Ete Morto, 9 kilometres (6 mi) from the Adriatic Sea.

== Toponym ==
The historical name of locality is documented by an 11th-century parchment as "Sancto Elpidio Majore" to distinguish it from other places in Sant'Elpidio Morico Brand Fermana. The abbreviation of "majore" was later changed to "mare" ("sea" in Italian).

== History ==
The town occupies the site of the ancient Roman city of Cluana, destroyed by the Visigoths in the early 5th century. A large Benedictine Abbey was founded here in 887; the medieval borough rose around it as Castello di Sant'Elpidio, starting from the 11th century.

== Main sights ==
- Imperial Abbey of Santa Croce al Chienti. This is a Benedictine convent founded, according to tradition, in 887 on a pre-existing religious building. The heyday of the abbey was between the 10th and the 12th century in which it was enlarged and renovated in Romanesque style.
- Church of Madonna dei Lumi
- Church of Sant'Elpidio Abate
- Sanctuary of Madonna degli Angeli
- Church of Sant'Agostino (14th century)
- Basilica Lateranense di Maria Santissima della Misericordia, Sant'Elpidio a Mare
- Remains of 3 kilometres (1.9 mi) of the 13th and 14th century walls; only three of the seven original gates are visible today
- Torre Gerosolimitana ("Tower of the Knights of Jerusalem"), built by the Knights Hospitaller in the 16th century
- Town Hall (14th century)

== Notable people ==
- Bernardino Ciaffoni (c. 1615–1683), Italian theologian
- Edoardo Pacini (born 1991), footballer

== See also ==
- Porto Sant'Elpidio
