= Gustavo Uzielli =

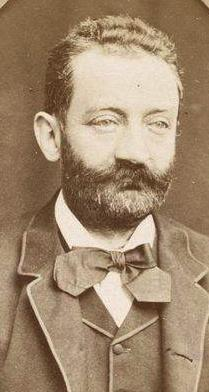
Gustavo Uzielli in the second half of the nineteenth century

Gustavo Uzielli (May 29, 1839 in Livorno – March 7, 1911) was an Italian geologist, historian, and scientist.

== Biography ==
Gustavo Uzielli was born in 1839 in Livorno (Tuscany) within a wealthy family of Jewish origin. He made his studies at Marseille where he obtained his baccalaureate of science. Later he studied at the universities of Paris and Pisa, where he graduated and became a doctor of mathematics and physics.

He took part in several campaigns undertaken in favor of the unification of Italy first as a soldier in 1859, and then in 1860 with Garibaldi until 1866. At the end of the war he received a gold medal as a result of their military value in the Battle of Volturno. Was admitted in 1867 to the Florence Italian Geographical Society. He then worked as an assistant in mineralogy to Royal University of Rome. In 1869 the astronomer Giambattista Donati extended the workshop Galileo which he ran, contributing to the invention of new tools of physics and topography. Performed interesting studies on the history of geography, the globes and charts.

Of particular importance are studies relating to travel by Paolo dal Pozzo Toscanelli and Amerigo Vespucci, who contributed to the work of Colombian Commission, created to celebrate the discovery of America in its fourth centenary. Many studies Uzielli were inspired by Leonardo da Vinci, as a scientist as well as a writer and artist. In 1872 he made a trip to Vinci, to get closer to the birthplace of the scientist, and together with his brothers Martelli, Frederick, Louis and Roberto, helped to give birth to the Museum Leonardo. Taught in 1877 in the Universitat de Modena Mineralogy and Geology in 1880 from the School of Application for engineers in Turin. Ceased its work of historical research, he devoted himself to the publication of numerous pamphlets and articles on various topics from geology to drinking water, inland navigation to the arrangement of mountain basins, communications stations in Livorno, La Spezia and Genoa, at issues in the city. Died in Impruneta, May 7, 1911.

The Via Gustavo Uzielli in Vinci is named after him.
