= Pablo Menichetti =

Chilean author and coach (born 1973)

Pablo Andrés Menichetti Tassara
- Born: June 8, 1973 (age 53); Santiago, Chile
- Education: Craighouse School, Pontificia Universidad Católica de Chile
- Occupations: Author, Educational Coach, motivational speaker
- Years active: 2006-present
- Known for: Educational Coach
- Spouses: Javiera Gonzalez (1995-1997), Mamito Ito (2011-present)
- Children: 3

Pablo Andrés Menichetti Tassara (born June 8, 1973) is a Chilean author and coach. He is known for his work in Educational Coaching, students and teachers seminars, and two self-help books, Smart Learning and the Educator of the Future.

== Early life and education ==
Menichetti was born in Santiago de Chile, on June 8, 1973. During his primary and secondary education he attended the Craighouse School. He then attended the Pontificia Universidad de Chile university, where he graduated in 1998 with a Bachelor in Business Management.

At the age of 22, while still studying, his first son was born. The experience of raising a child and studying at the same time made him struggle with his studies. He started to wonder how to study more efficiently and why the educational system had not empowered him with any learning techniques.

Years later, his own son suffered the same problems with the educational system. His inability to motivate his son to study, due to his own lack of strategies as a father, had a big impact in his life. This became his motivation to start his career as an Educational Coach.

== Career ==
Menichetti started his Educational Coach career while living in Singapore where he was mentored by trainers like Robert Kyosaki, T. Harv Eker and Anthony Robbins.

Influenced by these personal development coaches and by the Singapore Educational System, he started working on how to learn fast while at the same time enjoying the process. Since then, he has dedicated his life to studying the latest educational technologies, personal development and learning strategies for students.

Menichetti returned to Chile in 2010 and published his first book for parents: "Smart Learning, How to get your children to enjoy studying and obtain results, Fast!". In August 2012 the book became Nº1 bestseller in the main Chilean rankings This allowed Menichetti to sign a contract with Random House Mondadori and distribute the book throughout the rest of Latin America.

In 2014 he published his second book, this time for teachers: "Smart Learning and the Educator of the Future". The aim of the book was to give teachers the tools to become coaches in their own classes, suggesting that they take a back seat and let students take a more active role in class.

He has been regarded by the Chilean media as the "Guru" (La Nación) of Educational Coaching and the Nº1 Educational Coach in Latin America.

Menichetti co-founded the educational coaching company Smart Learning in 2012. The company was certified as a B Corporation in 2017.

== Books ==
- Menichetti, Pablo (2011). Smart Learning: How to make your children enjoy studies and achieve their goals fast. Santiago-Chile: Penguin Randomhouse. pp. 212 pages. ISBN 978-956-258-372-5. Traducido al español como Aprendizaje Inteligente.
- Menichetti, Pablo (2014). Smart Learning and The Teacher of the Future. Santiago-Chile: Penguin Random House. pp. 220 pages. ISBN 978-956-258-407-4. Traducido al español como Aprendizaje Inteligente y El Educador del Futuro.

== Personal life ==
In November 1995, Menichetti married Javiera González who was expecting his first son, they divorced in 2001. In June 2011, he married Mamiko Ito. They had a son and a daughter and live in Santiago de Chile.
