= Andrea Lilio =

Italian painter (1555–1642)

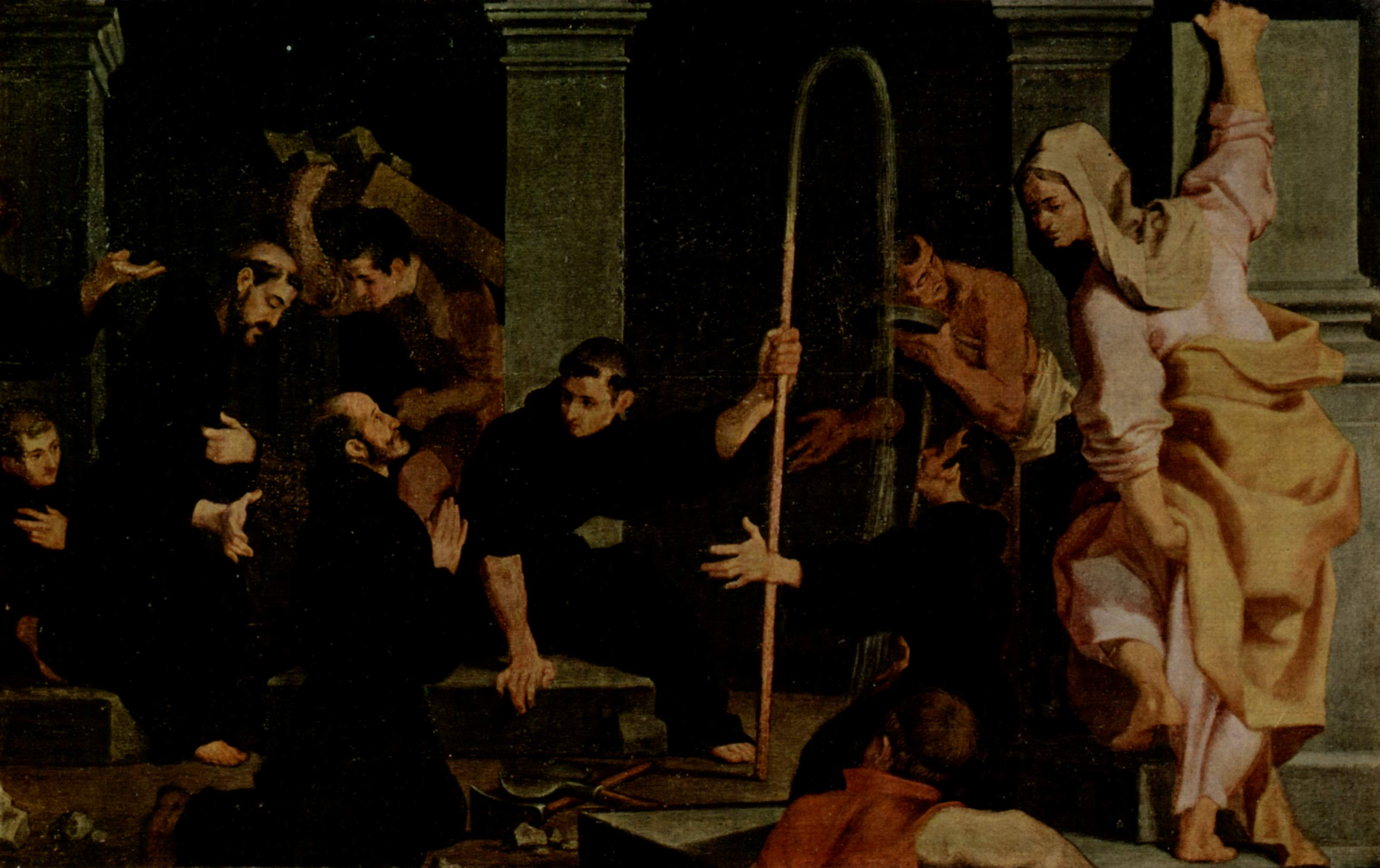
Story of St Nicola

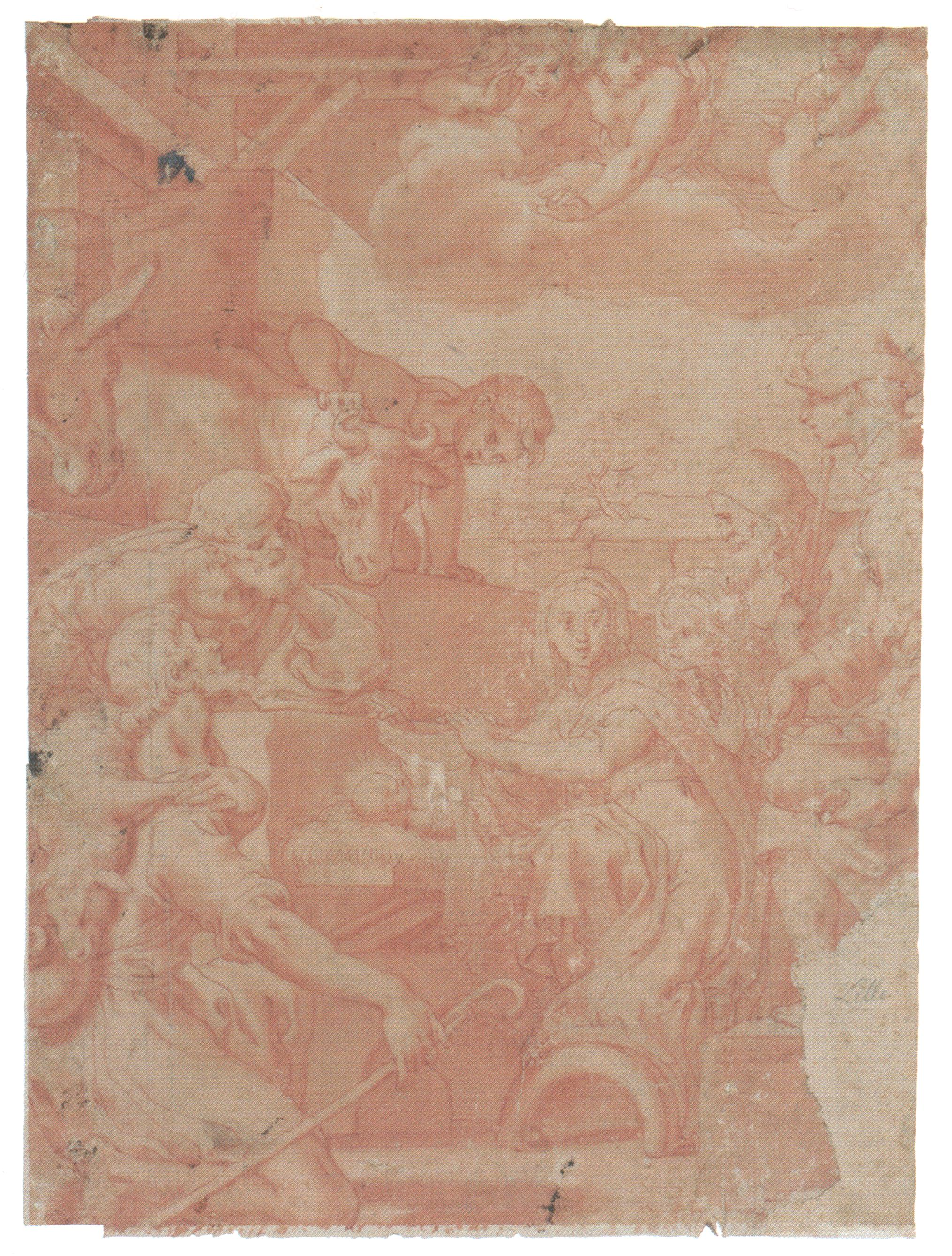
Adoration of Shepards, sanguine

Andrea Lilio (1555 - 1642) was an Italian painter born in Ancona, hence he also is known as L'Anconitano.

He painted mainly in his native city, as well as in Rome, where he was active from the beginning of the 17th century until around 1640. He was employed by Pope Sixtus V in the decoration of the library of the Vatican and in the decoration of the Scala Santa in San Giovanni Laterano. In the latter, he painted, Moses striking the Rock and Moses with the Brazen Serpent.

Said to have been a pupil of Federico Barocci, Lilio created a popular niche for himself by painting allegories for aristocratic audiences. In fact, it is altogether possible that Lilio collaborated for the illustrations of Cesare Ripa's Iconologia, which was a popular source for such motifs for a very long time. He died at Ascoli Piceno.

In a chapel of the Chiesa Nuova, he painted The Archangel Michael driving fallen angels from Heaven. He continued to ornament churches and convents of Rome during the reign of Pope Clement VIII.

One of his masterpieces, the Martyrdom of Saint Lawrence, was painted for Santa Caterina in Ancona. He painted the Christ Washing the Feet of His Disciples for the nave of Santa Maria Maggiore in Rome. He also was part of the team active in the painting of the Sistine chapel (chapel of Nativity) in Santa Maria Maggiore. For the cathedral of Fano, he painted a picture of All Saints.

Four new allegorical paintings by Lilio were identified in Milan's Bagatti Valsecchi Museum, Milan.
