= Panfili =

Panfili is a surname. Notable people with the surname include:

- Antonio Panfili (born 1993), Italian figure skater
- Pio Panfili (1723–1812), Italian painter and engraver
- Rusanda Panfili (born 1988), Moldovan-Romanian violinist and composer
