= Montelparo =

- Comune
- Comune di Montelparo
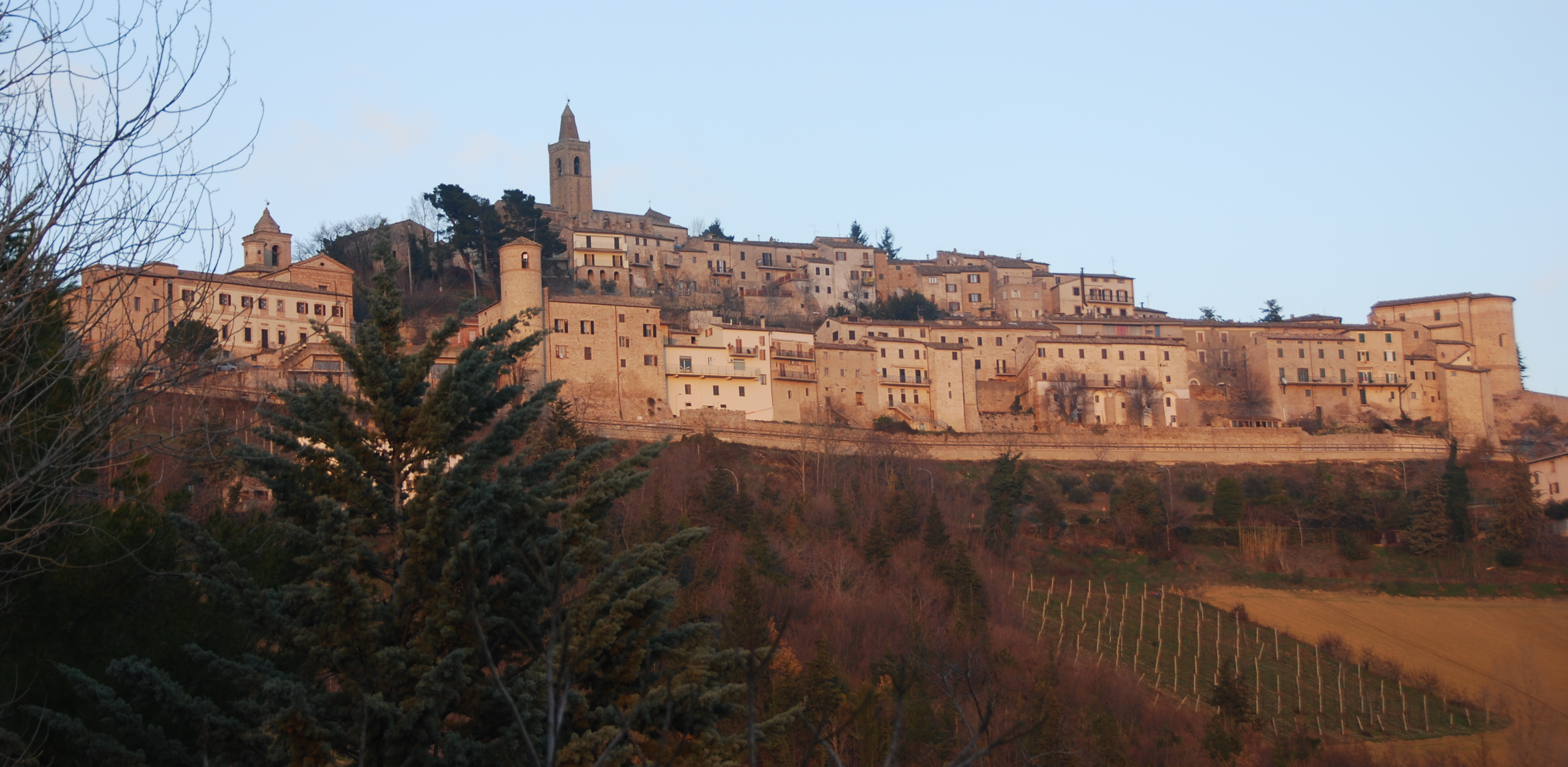
- Panorama of Montelparo

- Location within Italy Location within Marche
- Coordinates: 43°1′N 13°32′E
- Country: Italy
- Region: Marche
- Province: Province of Fermo (FM)

Area
  - Total: 21.6 km^{2} (8.3 sq mi)

Population (Dec. 2004)
  - Total: 929
  - Density: 43.0/km^{2} (111/sq mi)
- Time zone: UTC+1 (CET)
  - Summer (DST): UTC+2 (CEST)
- Postal code: 63020
- Dialing code: 0734

Montelparo is a comune (municipality) in the Province of Fermo in the Italian region Marche, located about 75 kilometres (47 mi) south of Ancona, about 30 kilometres (19 mi) north of Ascoli Piceno and 35 kilometres (22 mi) of Fermo. As of 31 December 2004, it had a population of 929 and an area of 21.6 square kilometres (8.3 mi^{2}).

Montelparo borders the following municipalities: Force, Monsampietro Morico, Montalto delle Marche, Monte Rinaldo, Montedinove, Monteleone di Fermo, Rotella, Santa Vittoria in Matenano.

== Demographic evolution ==
Historical population

Year	Pop.	±%
1861	1,509	—
1871	1,558	+3.2%
1881	1,507	−3.3%
1901	1,702	+12.9%
1911	1,774	+4.2%

Year	Pop.	±%
1921	1,879	+5.9%
1931	2,120	+12.8%
1936	2,358	+11.2%
1951	2,310	−2.0%
1961	1,886	−18.4%

Year	Pop.	±%
1971	1,268	−32.8%
1981	1,121	−11.6%
1991	1,002	−10.6%
2001	964	−3.8%

Source: Data from ISTAT

== Notable people ==
- Gregorio Petrocchini (1535-1612), cardinal and bishop
