= Monsampietro Morico =

- Comune
- Comune di Monsampietro Morico
- Coat of arms

- Location within Italy Location within Marche
- Coordinates: 43°4′N 13°33′E
- Country: Italy
- Region: Marche
- Province: Fermo
- Frazioni: Sant'Elpidio Morico

Government
  - Mayor: Romina Gualtieri

Area
  - Total: 9.6 km^{2} (3.7 sq mi)
- Elevation: 289 m (948 ft)

Population (31 October 2009)
  - Total: 707
  - Density: 74/km^{2} (190/sq mi)
- Demonym: Monsampietrini
- Time zone: UTC+1 (CET)
  - Summer (DST): UTC+2 (CEST)
- Postal code: 63029
- Dialing code: 0734
- Website: Official website

Monsampietro Morico is a comune (municipality) in the Province of Fermo in the Italian region Marche, located about 70 kilometres (43 mi) south of Ancona, about 35 kilometres (22 mi) north of Ascoli Piceno and 20 kilometres (12 mi) of Fermo. It was founded in 1061 as a castle (rebuilt in the 15th century) under a Norman count from Apulia. Later it was part of the de Varano seigniory and, from 1415 to 1416, of Carlo Malatesta's lands. It is also home to a 13th-century Romanesque church, dedicated to St. Paul.

Monsampietro Morico borders the following municipalities: Belmonte Piceno, Monte Rinaldo, Monteleone di Fermo, Montelparo, Montottone.
