= Gualdo =

Gualdo may refer to several places in Italy:

- Gualdo (MC), in the Province of Macerata, Marche
- Gualdo Cattaneo, in the Province of Perugia, Umbria
- Gualdo Tadino, in the Province of Perugia, Umbria
- Gualdo, a frazione of Roncofreddo, Emilia-Romagna

== Other ==
- S.S. Gualdo, an Italian football club based in Gualdo Tadino
