= San Giovanni Battista, Monteleone di Fermo =

Church in Monteleone di Fermo, Italy

San Giovanni Battista is a Romanesque-style, Roman Catholic church located in the town of Monteleone di Fermo, in the province of Fermo, region of Marche, Italy.

== History ==
The church was built from the 12th-14th centuries against the town walls, and the bell-tower with a hexagonal base, derives from one of the watchtowers. The entrance portal is in brick, but the architrave is pre-Romanesque.

The interiors have frescoes, painted from after the second world war, depicting the life of John the Baptist. The main altar has statues of John the Baptist, St Anthony Abbot, and St Philomena. There is also an 18th-century depiction of St Antony of Padua and a 17th-century Saints plead for the territory to the Madonna. The church also houses a Madonna and St John Evangelist (15th-century) from the school of Crivelli, and originally found in the town's church of Santa Maria della Misericordia. The interior also houses a silver crucifix (1524) by Bartolomeo da Montelparo.
