= San Savino, Gualdo =

Church in Gualdo, Italy

Coordinates: 43°04′00.3″N 13°20′16.7″E

San Savino is a Baroque-style Roman Catholic church located on Piazza Vittorio Emanuele III and Via Giacomo Leopardi in the town of Gualdo, province of Macerata, in the region of Marche, Italy.

== History ==
An earlier 14th century church at the site was rebuilt in the late 18th century by the architect Pietro Maggi. The layout is that of a Greek Cross with a central dome with ribbed arches. The simple brick façade is flanked a single bell tower; it contains a marble plaque dedicated to those fallen during the war.

The interior, including the cupula, was frescoed in the 1930s by Guglielmo Ciarlantini with decorative symbols and grotteschi. The main altarpiece, depicting a Madonna and Child with St John the Baptist and St Savino, was painted by Antonio Liozzi. The left transept has an altar with a canvas depicting the Last Supper (1693) attributed to Ubaldo Ricci. The work was commissioned by the confraternity of the Santissimo Sacramento.
