= Antonio Liozzi =

Italian painter (1730–1807)

- Born: 1730; Penna San Giovanni, Papal States
- Died: 1807 (aged 76–77)

Antonio Liozzi (1730–1807) was an Italian painter, active in a late-Baroque style in his native city of Penna San Giovanni.

== Biography ==
He was born to a middle-class family in Penna San Giovanni, a town in the province of Macerata. The majority of his works, mostly of religious subjects, are preserved in cathedrals and churches throughout the diocese of Fermo and the commune offices in Penna San Giovanni.

== Life and work ==
Logo for the Federazione fra le Società Filateliche Italiane for Antonio Liozzi

Liozzi trained under the tutelage of Marco Benefial (1684–1764) in the capital city of Rome at Benefial's private studio.

Liozzi's work may be seen at the Cathedral Santa Maria, in Ortezzano and at the 14th century church of San Savino in Gualdo as well. In Penna San Giovanni, the Cathedral of Sant Pietro, the Commune building and the Flora Theater contain oil canvases of his work.

The Flora Theater in the central Penna San Giovanni is a Baroque structure; the wood facade was decorated by Liozzi with floral motifs and was the site of an international conference on frescoes featuring his work. A series of wooden hexagon columns painted in a faux marble pattern, support the steel reinforced core while two rows of wooden balustrades decorate the frames and are topped with floral garlands. The center of the ceiling illuminates an intricate pattern of cornices and moldings. Liozzi's signature fresco adorns the wooden ceiling, opening to a blue sky in which stands the goddess Flora. For years the theater was abandoned and almost lost to modernization. In 1985 it was designated as a historic national treasure and renovated to its original luster.

== Gallery ==
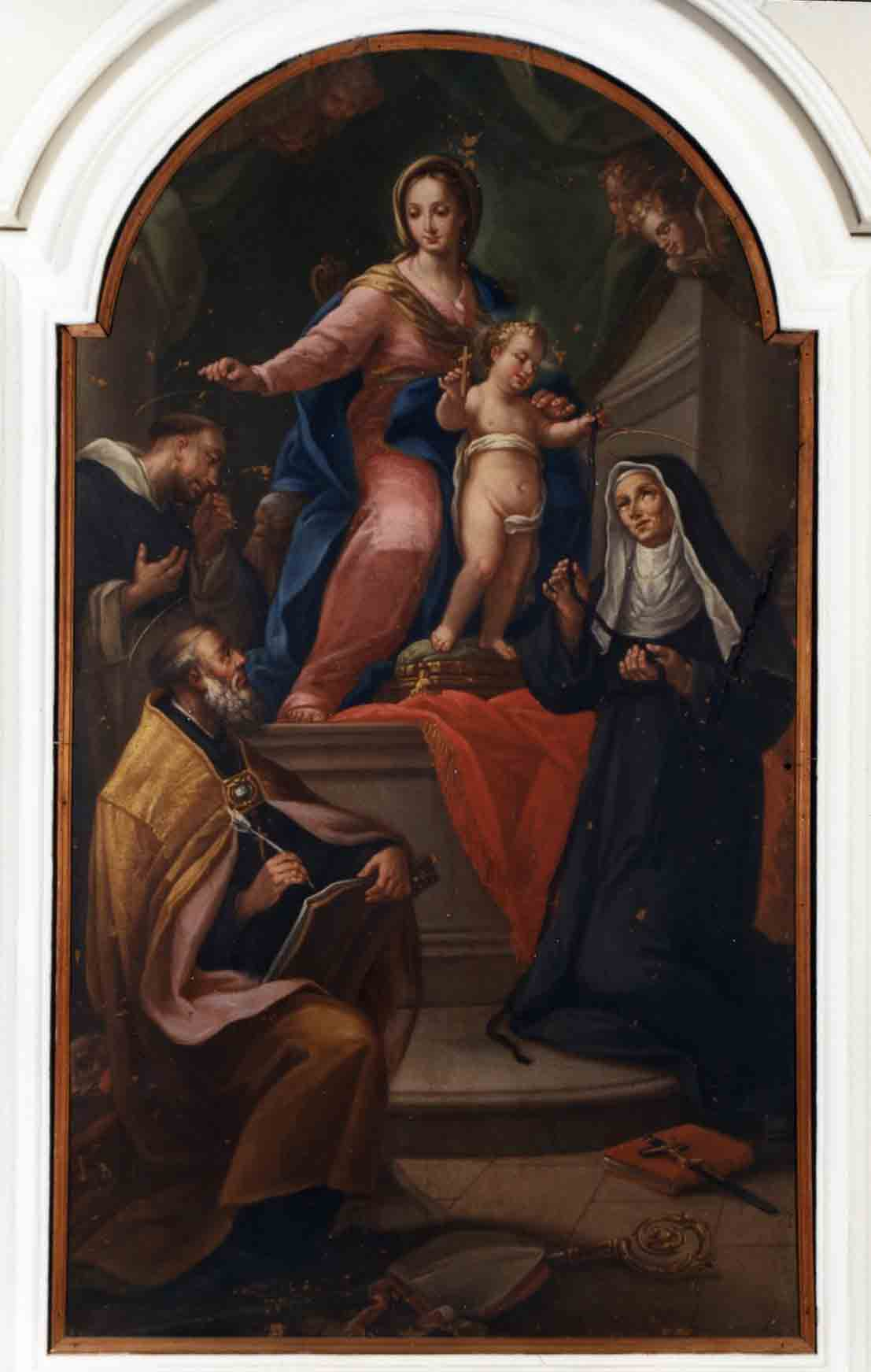
Madonna del Rosario e SS. Domenico, Agostino e Rita.

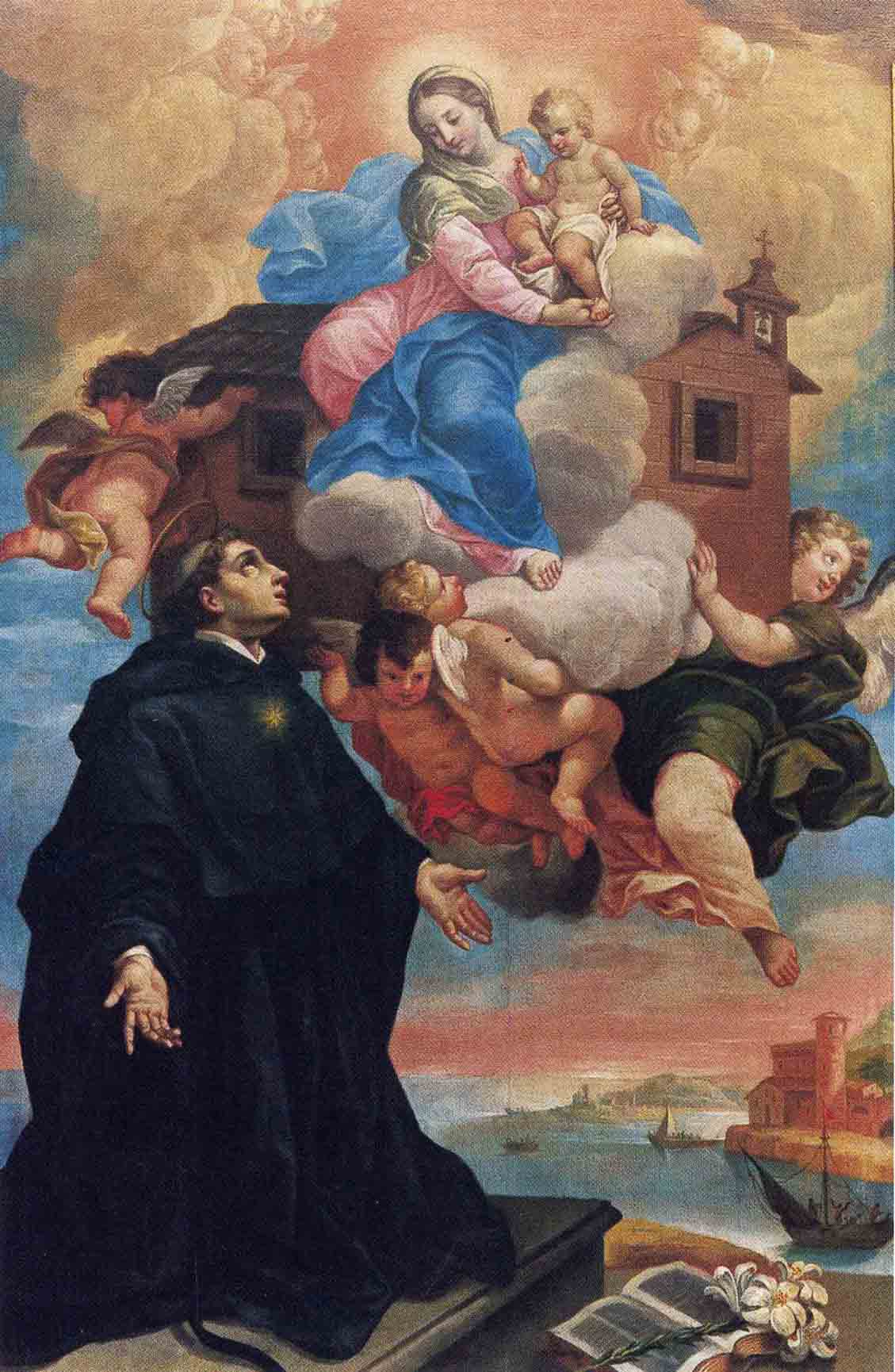
Madonna di Loreto e San Nicola

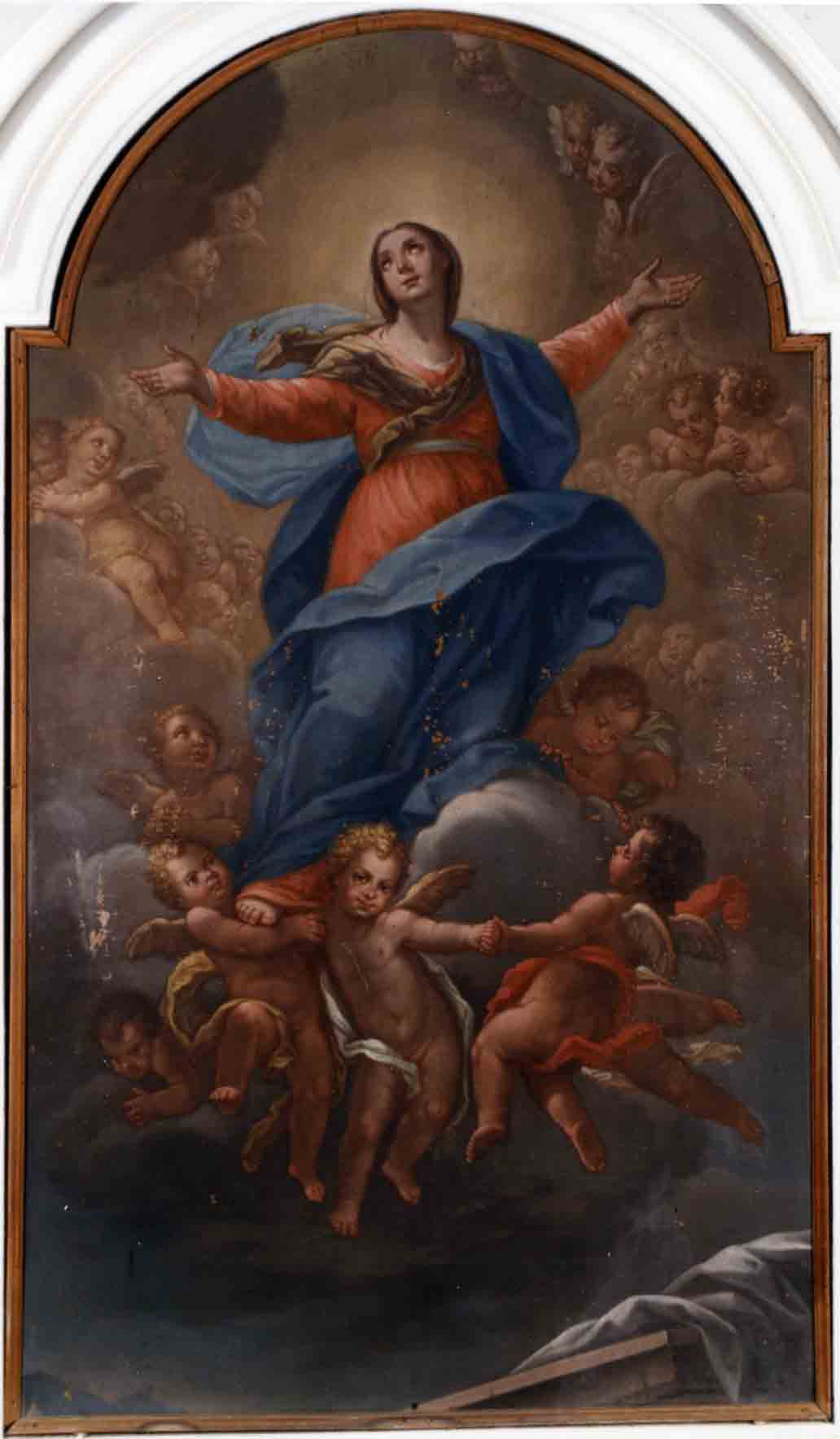
Assunta
