= San Marone Martire, Monteleone di Fermo =

Church in Monteleone di Fermo, Italy

San Marone Martire is a Roman Catholic parish church located in the town of Monteleone di Fermo, in the province of Fermo, region of Marche, Italy.

== History ==
The brick church was erected in the 15th century adjacent to an Augustinian convent. The bell-tower was built using bricks from the old rural church of San Marone. It houses a 16th-century wood crucifix by Fra Bartolomeo da Montelparo, derived from the church of Santa Maria della Misericordia.
