= Gregorio Petrocchini =

Italian cardinal (1535–1612)

Cardinal Gregorio Petrocchini
- Church: Catholic Church
- Appointed: 20 December 1589
- Term ended: 19 May 1612

Personal details
- Born: 1535 Montelparo
- Died: 19 May 1612 (aged 76–77) Rome
- Denomination: Catholic

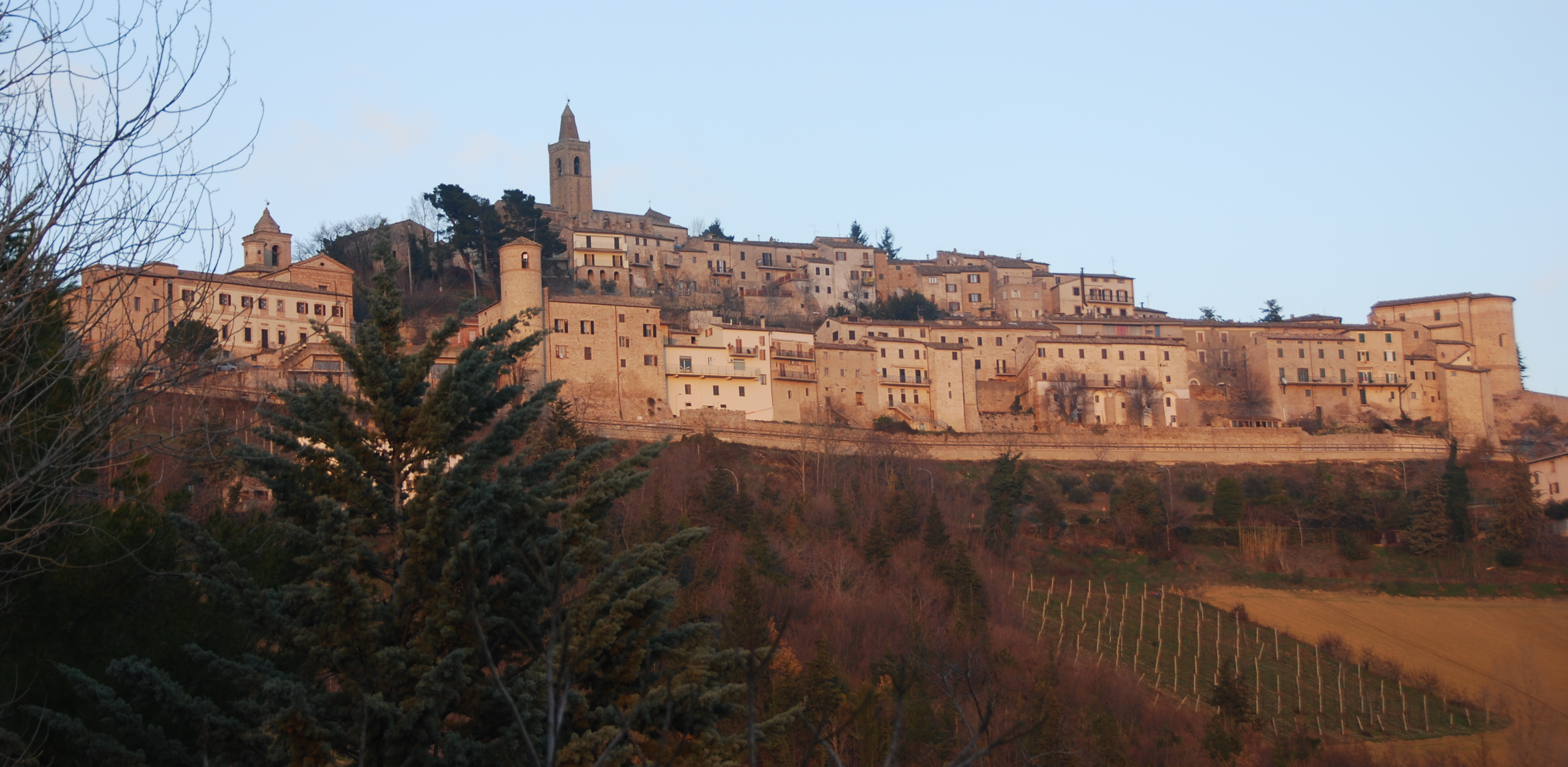
Montelparo, the birthplace of Gregorio Petrcchini in 1535

Gregorio Petrocchini (1535 – 19 May 1612) was an Italian cardinal at the end of sixteenth and early seventeenth century.

== Biography ==
Gregorio Petrocchini was born in 1535 in Montelparo, now in the province of Fermo in the region of Marche, then in the Papal States. After beginning his studies in his hometown, Petrocchini entered the order of Order of Saint Augustine at a very young age. He studied philosophy and theology at the University of Bologna in 1567, then at the University of Macerata, where he obtained his doctorate in theology and where he taught from 1578 onward.

=== Superior General ===
In response to general expectations, Pope Sixtus V appointed Petrocchini superior general of his order in a ceremony in Rome in 1587, after the death of P. Spirito Vicentini. At the end of 1588, the Pope named him Apostolic Commissioner to visit the monasteries of his order in Spain. He was appointed a cardinal on his return to Rome at the consistory of 20 December 1589. On 23 March 1590, Cardinal Petrocchini became the Cardinal protector of the Augustines.

=== Cardinal Bishop ===
Petrocchini participated in the first conclave of 1590, during which Urban VII was elected pope, the second in the same year (election of Gregory XIV) and those of 1591 (election of Innocent IX), 1592 (election of Clement VIII) the first of 1605 (election of Leo XI), and the second in the same year (election of Paul V). He was Camerlengo of the Holy Roman Church from 7 January 1605 to 8 January 1607.

On 28 May 1608, he was named Cardinal-Priest of Saint Maria of Trastevere, then Saint Lorenzo in Lucina on 24 January 1611, before becoming cardinal-bishop of Palestrina on 17 August of the same year.

Cardinal Petrocchini died in Rome on 19 May 1612 at the age of 77 years.
