= Monteleone di Fermo =

- Comune
- Comune di Monteleone di Fermo
- Location within Italy Location within Marche
- Coordinates: 43°3′N 13°32′E
- Country: Italy
- Region: Marche
- Province: Province of Fermo (FM)

Area
  - Total: 8.1 km^{2} (3.1 sq mi)

Population (Dec. 2004)
  - Total: 449
  - Density: 55/km^{2} (140/sq mi)
- Time zone: UTC+1 (CET)
  - Summer (DST): UTC+2 (CEST)
- Postal code: 63020
- Dialing code: 0734

Monteleone di Fermo is a comune (municipality) in the Province of Fermo in the Italian region Marche, located about 70 kilometres (43 mi) south of Ancona, about 35 kilometres (22 mi) north of Ascoli Piceno and 25 kilometres (16 mi) of Fermo. As of 31 December 2004, it had a population of 449 and an area of 8.1 square kilometres (3.1 mi^{2}).

Monteleone di Fermo borders the following municipalities: Belmonte Piceno, Monsampietro Morico, Montelparo, Santa Vittoria in Matenano, Servigliano.

Among the churches in the town are the following:

- San Marone Martire.
- San Giovanni Battista, Monteleone di Fermo.
- Madonna di Loreto.
- Madonna della Misericordia.

== Demographic evolution ==
Historical population

Year	Pop.	±%
1861	1,135	—
1871	1,194	+5.2%
1881	1,122	−6.0%
1901	1,230	+9.6%
1911	1,151	−6.4%

Year	Pop.	±%
1921	1,319	+14.6%
1931	1,253	−5.0%
1936	1,276	+1.8%
1951	1,156	−9.4%
1961	954	−17.5%

Year	Pop.	±%
1971	633	−33.6%
1981	561	−11.4%
1991	517	−7.8%
2001	454	−12.2%

Source: Data from ISTAT
