= Corropoli =

- Comune
- Comune di Corropoli
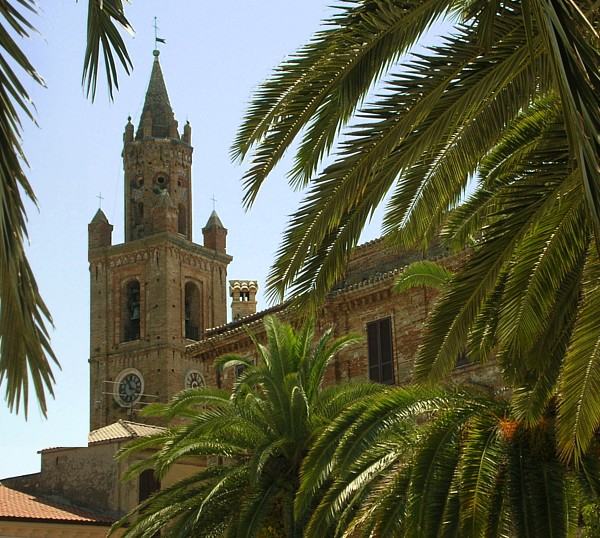

- Location within Italy Location within Abruzzo
- Coordinates: 42°49′N 13°50′E
- Country: Italy
- Region: Abruzzo
- Province: Teramo (TE)
- Frazioni: Accattapane, Centro Storico, Centurati, Colle Mejulano, Gabbiano, Montagnola, Pianagallo, Piane san Donato, Ravigliano, Ripoli, Vibrata

Government
  - Mayor: Dantino Vallese

Area
  - Total: 21 km^{2} (8.1 sq mi)
- Elevation: 132 m (433 ft)

Population (January 31, 2006)
  - Total: 4,195
  - Density: 200/km^{2} (520/sq mi)
- Demonym: Corropolesi
- Time zone: UTC+1 (CET)
  - Summer (DST): UTC+2 (CEST)
- Postal code: 64013
- Dialing code: 0861
- Patron saint: St. Agnes of Rome
- Saint day: January 21
- Website: Official website

Corropoli (locally Currùppië) is a town and comune in Teramo province in the Abruzzo region of eastern Italy. In recent years the town has had a population of just under 4000 individuals. The commune has approximately 1300 families and 1500 habitations. The gentilic for the town is Corropolesi. Corropoli takes its name from the word "Ripoli", an ancient neolithic settlement located nearby. These ruins were discovered by Concezio Rosa, a physician from Corropoli, in 1871. The patron saint of Corropoli is Saint Agnes. The commune has a density of approximately 170 individuals per square kilometer. The zip code for the town is 64013 and the phone prefix is 0861.

== History ==
In the third century BC. the area of Corropoli came under Roman influence. The Romans constructed many villas and temples in the area. Archaeological investigations conducted in the 1970s and 80s yielded a large number of Roman artifacts including dozens of terracotta pieces, amphoras, bowls, and remains of villas. Atop these items were the remains of several more recent monasteries.

Between 1393 and 1760 Corropoli was one of the 19 dukedoms under the ruling Acquaviva family. It was given to them by King Ferrante in gratitude for the Acquavivas' assistance in defeating the attacks of the rulers of nearby Atri. Under Acquaviva rule Corropoli was greatly fortified. The reinforced city walls constructed at this time were built as protection for the baronial castle of the Acquavivas. The castle had a torture room, vast wine cellars and stalls for approximately 40 horses.

For many years there has been a strong religious presence in the town. Present are the Abbey of Santa Maria di Mejulano (also known as "la Badia"), the monastery of Gabbiano, and, from a later period, the parish churches of Saint Agnes, the convent of Saint Mary of the Angels, the church of Saint Joseph and the church of Saint Donato.

One important medieval structure is the Torre Campanaria di Corropoli (Belltower of Corropoli), which today is considered the city's symbol. The tower was designed by Antonio da Lodi and was erected towards the end of the fifteenth century. It makes up one of four "fratelli" (brother or cohort) towers located in the province of Teramo, the others being located in the towns of Teramo, Atri and Campli.

In 528 Corropoli was ceded to Dorotea Gonzaga, Marchesa of Bitonto. In 1541 Dorotea Gonzaga gifted Corropoli and other nearby lands to her nephew Baldassarre Acquaviva. In 1694 Corropoli was part of the holdings of princess Francesca Caracciolo, wife of Giosia of Acquaviva, who had left it to her as a gift. Corropoli remained in the hands of the Acquaviva family through the year 1760 when the last of the family owners, Isabella Strozzi, died.

After the demise of the Acquavivas, the baronial caste was demolished and space was made for the Piazza Pie' di Corte ("Piazza at the foot of the Court" in reference to the location at the foot of the Acquaviva compound). Visitors from around the world travel to Corropoli to see this historic location.

During World War II, the fascist government operate the Corropoli internment camp from January 1941 to May 1944.

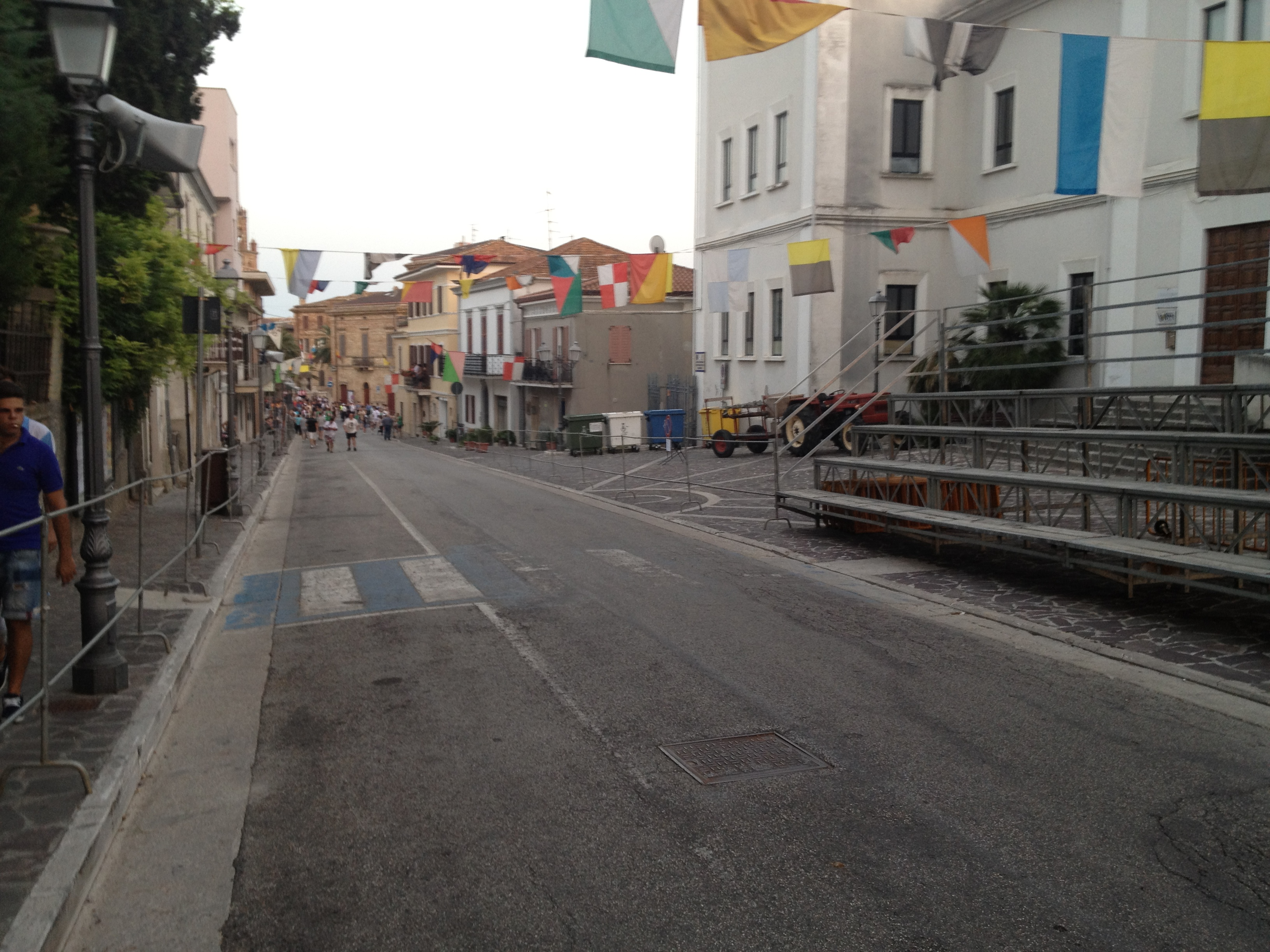
Palio delle Botti

== Activities ==
In the summer Corropoli hosts many exhibitions and fairs, including "Palio delle botti" and "Agosto a Corropoli" (August in Corropoli). In the past, Corropoli has hosted folk festivals as well as international women's volleyball championships. A popular event held in August is the "Mostra-Mercato degli Hobby, dell'Artigianato e dei Piatti Tipici" (Hobby, Artisan and Culinary Fair). A great number of stands are set up showcasing local food delicacies as well as handmade goods produced by local vendors and hobbyists.

Towns adjacent to Corropoli include Alba Adriatica, Colonnella, Controguerra, Nereto, Sant'Omero, and Tortoreto.

== Notable residents ==
Famous citizens include:

- Adolfo Borgognoni (1840–1893), writer
- Gaeteno D'Aristotile (1901–85), physician, dialectical poet
- Italo Foschi (1884–1949), sportsman and fascist, founder of the A.S. Roma
- Emanuele Scaramazza (1957– ), contemporary painter

== See also ==
- Abruzzo (wine)
