= Nereto internment camp =

Campo di internamento di Nereto
- Concentration camp
- Location within Italy
- Coordinates: 42°49′N 13°49′E
- Location: Nereto
- Operated by: Italy
- Operational: 1940
- Inmates: Civilian
- Liberated by: 1944

Nereto, in the province of Teramo, was one of several internment camps set up by the fascist government following the entry of Italy into World War II, to sit foreigners and anti-fascists. It operated from July 1940 to February 1944, with a maximum capacity of 160 people. There were Jewish and Slavic refugees interned from the Balkans in this camp.

== History ==
Two buildings in Nereto, the house owned by Silvio Santoni in Viale Vittorio Veneto 39 and that owned by Carine Lupins in alley Scarfoglio 4, were seen as possible sites for the camp in June 1940. Subsequently, in December 1940 it was added to the Agricultural Consortium (called "Palazzo bacologico") in Rome Avenue. The camp was used to collect Jewish and Slavic refugees. The management of the camp was in charge of the Secretary of Fascist Culture and Mario Marzi from July 1, 1940. From June 31, 1941, Commissioner Pasquale took over. The supervision was entrusted to the police and health matters to Dr. Bruno Marsili and then Dr. Salutanzi. The first inmates arrived in July 1940. The living conditions were poor. There were inspections from the Red Cross and the inmates received international aid from the Delegation for the Assistance of Jewish Emigrants (DELASEM). However, the buildings offered poor sanitation. Lupini House and the Palace bacologico in particular were dilapidated buildings. After September 8, 1943, the building of the Agricultural Consortium was evacuated to house German troops. On December 21, 1943, the German command demanded from the Italian authorities the delivery of all Jewish internees. Sixty-one Jews were handed over to them by the police and deported to the death camps. With the exception of seven inmates who escaped on December 27, 1943. Those who remained in the camp were now on the edge of survival. The approach of the allied army caused the permanent closure of the field on February 1, 1944, with the transfer of the remaining sixty-nine inmates to Corropoli internment camp.

== See also ==
- Holocaust in Italy
