= Servigliano =

- Comune
- Comune di Servigliano
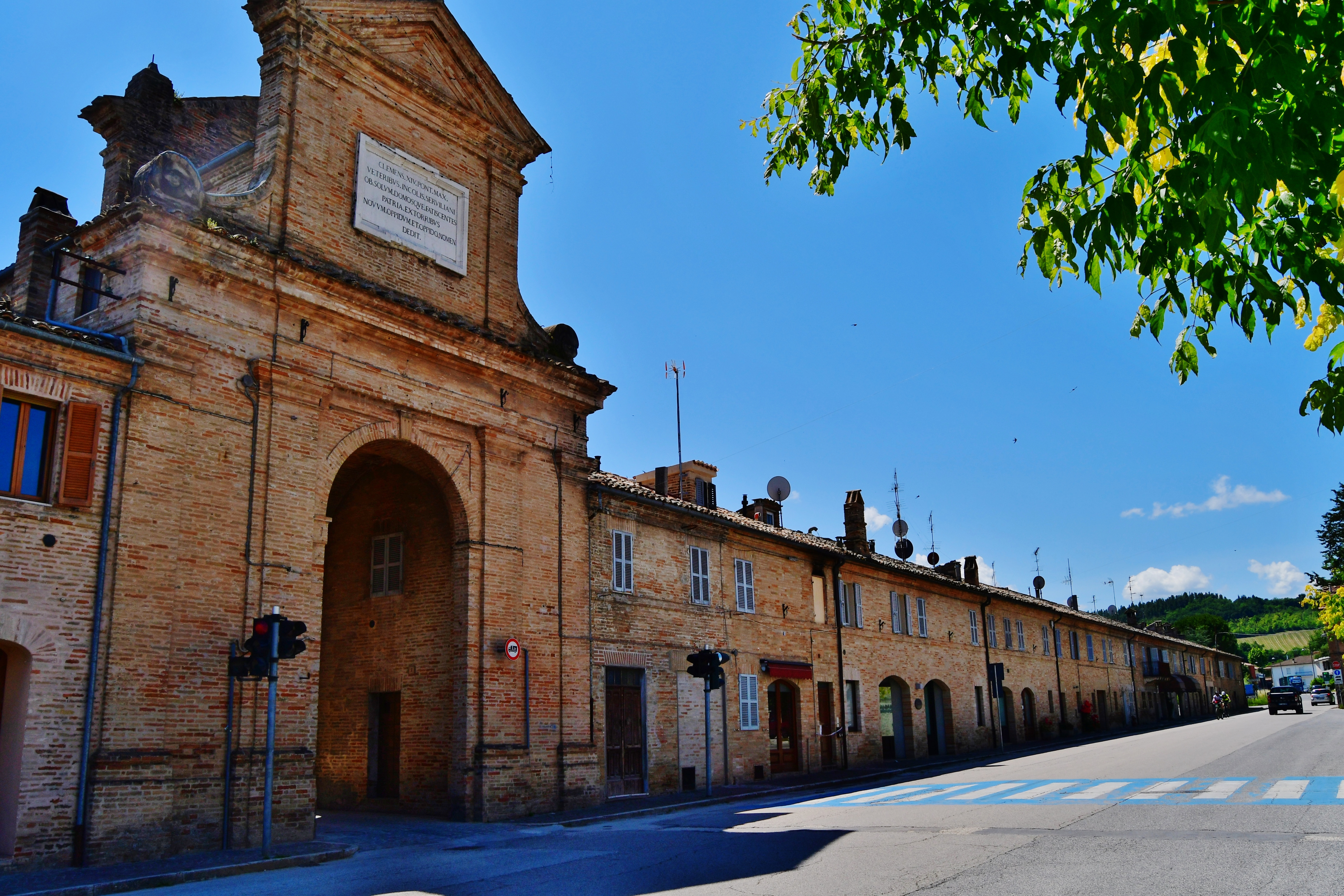

- Coat of arms

- Location within Italy Location within Marche
- Coordinates: 43°5′N 13°30′E
- Country: Italy
- Region: Marche
- Province: Province of Fermo (FM)

Area
  - Total: 18.5 km^{2} (7.1 sq mi)

Population (Dec. 2004)
  - Total: 2,349
  - Density: 127/km^{2} (329/sq mi)
- Demonym: Serviglianesi
- Time zone: UTC+1 (CET)
  - Summer (DST): UTC+2 (CEST)
- Postal code: 63839
- Dialing code: 0734
- Website: Official website

Servigliano is a comune (municipality) in the Province of Fermo in the Italian region Marche, located about 60 kilometres (37 mi) south of Ancona and about 25 kilometres (16 mi) north of Ascoli Piceno. As of 31 December 2004, it had a population of 2,349 and an area of 18.5 square kilometres (7.1 mi^{2}). It is one of I Borghi più belli d'Italia ("The most beautiful villages of Italy").

== History ==
Servigliano hosts a World War I and II prison camp, the Servigliano prison camp, which is now called "Parco della Pace" (Peace Park), serving as an Italian Republic memorial about cruelty and abuse in all wars. On May 5th, 1944, from this prison camp, 31 Jews were deported to Nazi concentration camps, and only 3 of them survived.

Servigliano borders the following municipalities: Belmonte Piceno, Falerone, Monte San Martino, Monteleone di Fermo, Penna San Giovanni, Santa Vittoria in Matenano.

== Demographic evolution ==
Historical population

Year	Pop.	±%
1861	2,378	—
1871	2,370	−0.3%
1881	2,436	+2.8%
1901	2,733	+12.2%
1911	2,985	+9.2%

Year	Pop.	±%
1921	3,104	+4.0%
1931	3,269	+5.3%
1936	3,236	−1.0%
1951	4,119	+27.3%
1961	2,854	−30.7%

Year	Pop.	±%
1971	2,506	−12.2%
1981	2,382	−4.9%
1991	2,348	−1.4%
2001	2,323	−1.1%

Source: Data from ISTAT
