= Pio Panfili =

Italian painter

Pio Panfili (May 5, 1723 – 17 June 1812) was an Italian painter and engraver.

== Biography ==
He was born in Porto San Giorgio in the province of Fermo. He trained with Antiveduto Grammatica, Natale Ricci in Fermo, and finally in the Accademia Clementina of Bologna, and was awarded Bolognese citizenship. After painting throughout the region, he moved to Bologna in 1767. He died in 1812 in Bologna. He painted the ceiling of the staircase of the monastery of the Padri Conventuali of Montegiorgio and the refectory of the Augustinians in Rimini. Also painted for palaces, including the Palazzo Priorale, and the ceiling of the cathedral of Fermo.

He published Vedute di Bologna with 52 engravings by himself and published by Petronio Dalla Volpe.
