= Santa Viviana, Rotella =

Church building in Rotella, Italy

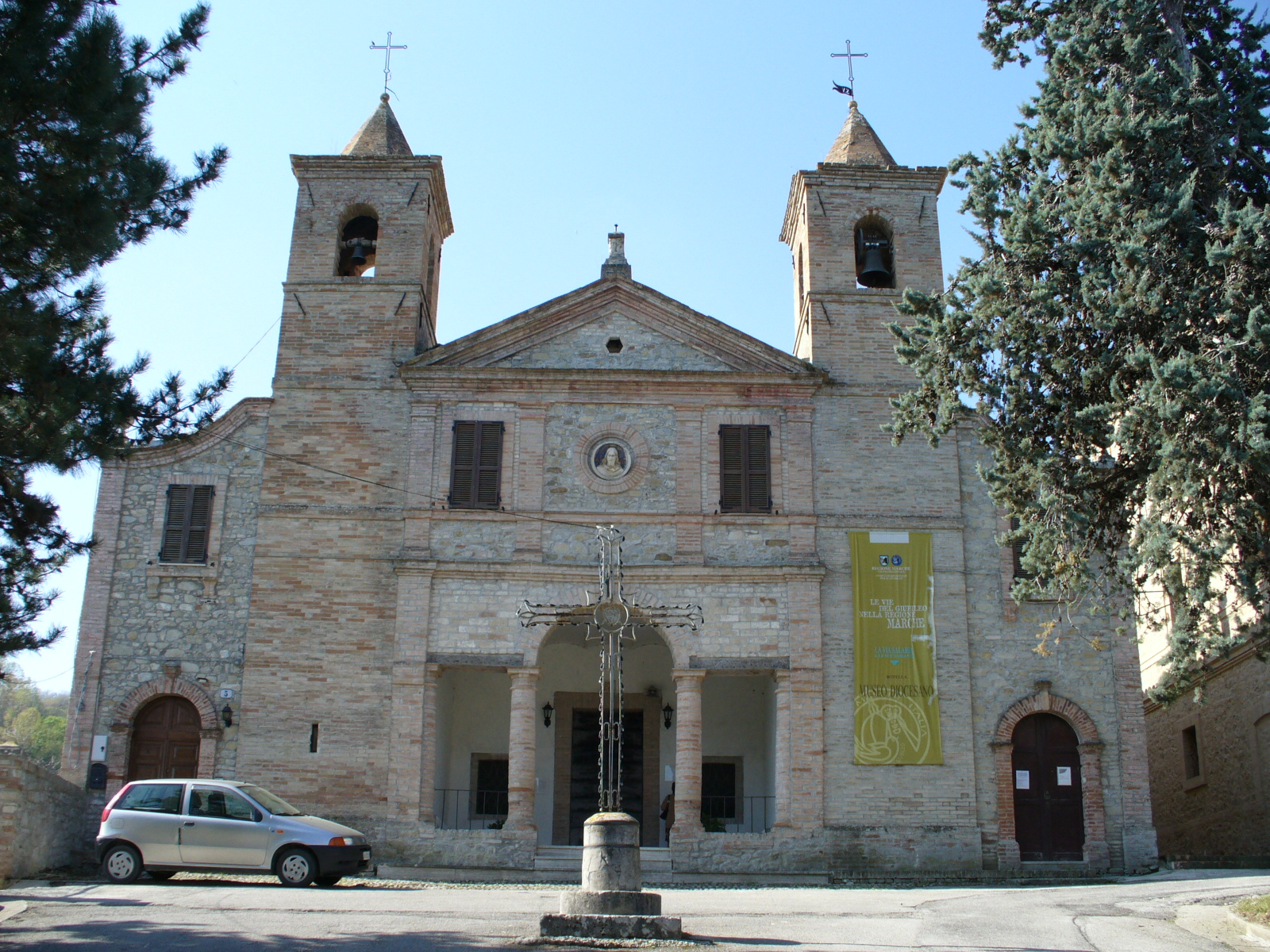

Santa Viviana is a baroque-style Roman Catholic church located at Viale Ciccolini #5 in the town of Rotella, in the province of Ascoli Piceno, region of Marche, Italy. It is also known as the Chiesa della Madonna delle Icone.

== History and description ==
Since before the 16th century, the small rural church of Santa Maria a Pie'di Monte, known as the Madonna delle Icone, was present on the site. This larger church was built and shelters now the relics of Santa Viviana or Bibiana, translated here by Pope Leo XIII. The present church was erected at the end of the 18th century by the Monsignor Ciccolini. The interior is decorated with polychrome baroque stucco decorations. The crypt is dedicated to St Pontico. The church now houses the Museo Diocesano Intercomunale di arte sacra.
