= Gualdo, Marche =

Gualdo di Macerata
- Comune
- Comune di Gualdo
- Location within Italy Location within Marche
- Coordinates: 43°04′01″N 13°20′17″E
- Country: Italy
- Region: Marche
- Province: Province of Macerata (MC)

Area
  - Total: 22.1 km^{2} (8.5 sq mi)

Population (Dec. 2004)
  - Total: 924
  - Density: 41.8/km^{2} (108/sq mi)
- Time zone: UTC+1 (CET)
  - Summer (DST): UTC+2 (CEST)
- Postal code: 62020
- Dialing code: 0733

Gualdo is a comune (municipality) in the Province of Macerata in the Italian region Marche, located about 90 kilometres (56 mi) southwest of Ancona and about 50 kilometres (31 mi) southwest of Macerata. As of 31 December 2004, it had a population of 924 and an area of 22.1 square kilometres (8.5 mi^{2}).

Gualdo borders the following municipalities: Amandola, Penna San Giovanni, San Ginesio, Sant'Angelo in Pontano, Sarnano.

Gualdo in the province of Macerata is situated at 652 metres (2,139 ft) above sea level with panoramic views of the Sibillini Mountains. It is between the Salino and Tenonacola Rivers, where the first inhabitants fled in the fourth century from the barbarians invasions.

The medieval castle of Gualdo belongs to the Bonifazi of Monte San Martino then to the Brunforte. After a brief period of peace feuds started with the Varano and then the Sforza.

Parts of the castle walls and towers remain visible in the 21st century.

== Attractions ==
The bell tower was built in the fourteenth century and was changed to a mechanical clock in 1850. Built by Pietro Mei of Montecarotto. It was restored in the 21st century. The parish church of San Savino was built with a Greek cross layout and a central dome. The church houses a Gonfalone del Rosario by Alessandro Ricci, and paintings depicting a Last Supper by Ubaldo Ricci and a Madonna with St Savino by Antonio Liozzi.

Adjacent to the parish church is the centre for Romolo Muri (1870–1944), dedicated to the founder of the Christian Democratic Party. The library and archives are available to scholars and researchers, and for conferences and seminars.

At the end of the avenue Vittorio Veneto is the church of the Madonna. It was once attached to a Franciscan convent, that now serves as nursing home. The 12th century Madonna delle Grazie is a Catholic Marian shrine.

== Demographic evolution ==
Historical population

| Year | Pop. | ±% |
|---|---|---|
| 1861 | 1,732 | — |
| 1871 | 1,918 | +10.7% |
| 1881 | 2,042 | +6.5% |
| 1901 | 2,189 | +7.2% |
| 1911 | 2,176 | −0.6% |

| Year | Pop. | ±% |
|---|---|---|
| 1921 | 2,331 | +7.1% |
| 1931 | 2,341 | +0.4% |
| 1936 | 2,370 | +1.2% |
| 1951 | 2,312 | −2.4% |
| 1961 | 1,930 | −16.5% |

| Year | Pop. | ±% |
|---|---|---|
| 1971 | 1,317 | −31.8% |
| 1981 | 1,058 | −19.7% |
| 1991 | 965 | −8.8% |
| 2001 | 920 | −4.7% |

Source: Data from ISTAT
