= Collegiate Church of Santi Maria e Lorenzo =

Catholic church in Ascoli Piceno province, Italy

Coordinates: 42°57′17.4″N 13°33′36.5″E

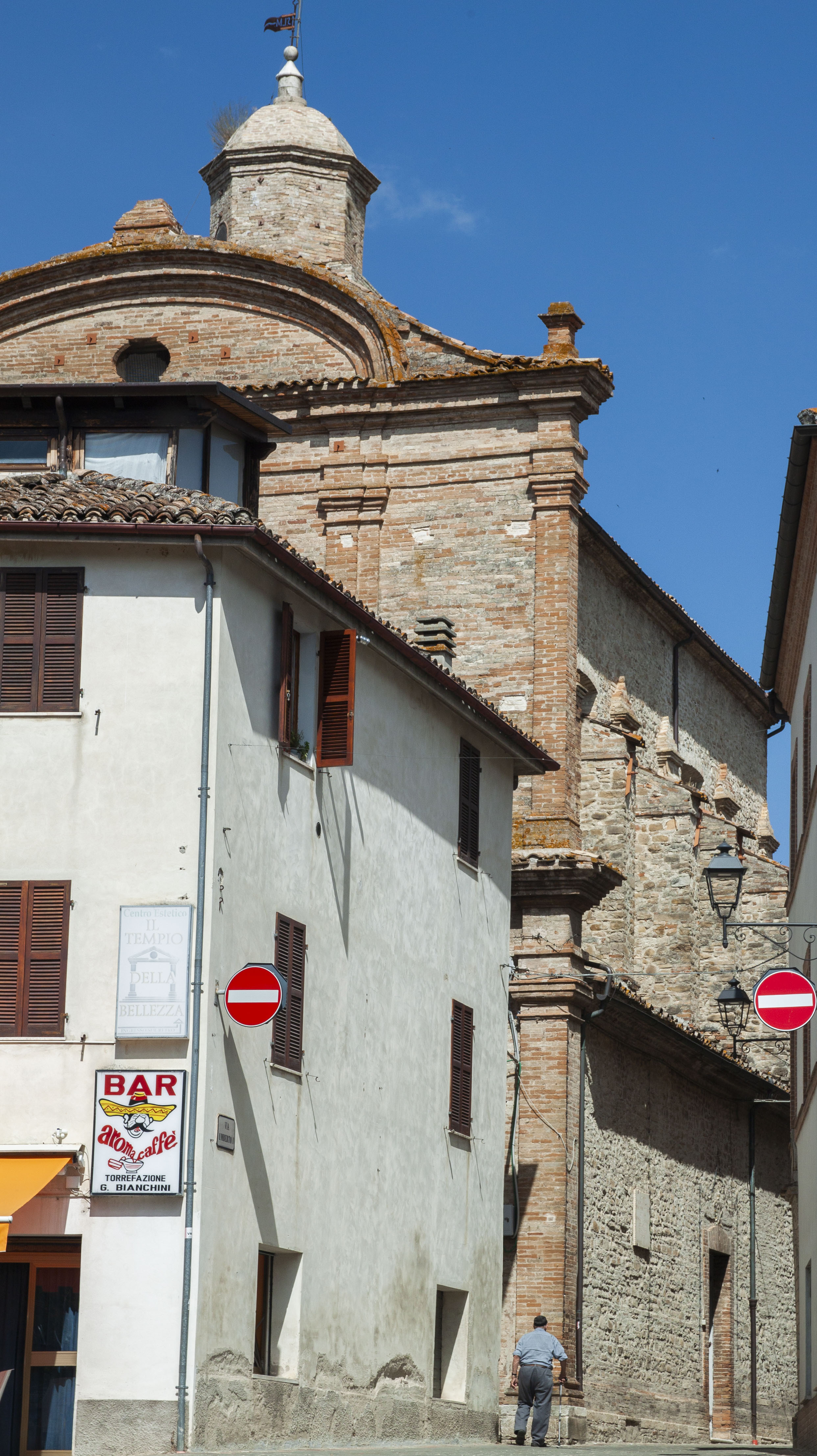

Santi Maria e Lorenzo is a baroque-style, Roman Catholic collegiate church on Via Giacomo Leopardi in the town of Rotella, in the province of Ascoli Piceno, region of Marche, Italy.

== History and description ==
The church was built in 1767, based on a design of Lazzaro Giosafatti. The church has a single nave, but various side altars. Among the interior artwork is a 15th-century polychrome terracotta Pietà, the reliquary of St Fortunato, a 17th-century organ, a 15th-century God the father sculpted in marble. The sacristy is richly decorated and the ceiling is frescoed with the Life of St Benedict.
