= Servigliano prison camp =

- prison camp
- Location within Italy
- Coordinates: 43°13′N 13°30′E
- Location: Servigliano
- Operated by: Italy
- Operational: October 1940
- Inmates: Prisoners of war
- Liberated by: September 1943

Servigliano prison camp began as a POW camp for Austrian soldiers of World War I. Following Italy's entry to World War II, the fascist government used it as a concentration camp for civilian and military prisoners between October 1940 to September 1943. The Italian Social Republic later converted it into a deportation camp for Jews between October 1943 and June 1944.

After World War II the camp was converted into a refugee camp for people coming from Istria, Libya and Ethiopia. It ceased to operate in 1955 and in 1970 it was finally dismantled.

== History ==
=== WW I ===
During the First World War, the camp was built on the outskirts of Servigliano, along the rail road. It consisted of forty wood and stone huts, surrounded by a high wall, outside of which stood the houses for the guards. From August 1916 to December 1919 several thousand Austrian prisoners were housed there.

After the war, with the repatriation of prisoners, the camp was closed. In 1935 the camp was dismantled and sold to the city for the construction of a sports field while part of it was used as a weapons depot.

=== WW II ===
With the outbreak of the Second World War the barracks that still existed were reactivated in October 1940 as an internment camp for about 20-25 Jewish refugees and foreigners. From 5 January 1941 it started being used as a camp for prisoners of war, beginning with approximately 3,000 Greeks and since February 1942 about 2,000 more, this time British and American nationals.

On 14 September 1943 (a few days after the armistice), the prisoners fled due to the imminent arrival of German troops through a hole in the wall and scattered in the surrounding countryside. On October 3 the camp was occupied by German troops.

On 30 October 1943 the camp was reactivated by the fascist authorities to house prisoners from the area. In late November, the government of the Italian Social Republic established a network of concentration camps for Jews caught in raids. Servigliano was chosen as a place of detention for the surrounding provinces of Ascoli Piceno and Frosinone. The camp management continued to be headed by Italian police personnel under the responsibility of the Ministry of the Interior. February 1944 saw the arrival of approximately 300 Maltese nationals from Tripoli.

On the night of 24 March 1944 a group of partisans broke into the camp to free Jewish prisoners. On 3 May, taking advantage of the bombardment of the camp and the news of the imminent arrival of the Germans, almost all the Jews present fled the camp. The Germans arrived the next morning and they were able to capture and deport a group of 34 people while 30 others were rescued and hidden by local families.

Faced with the difficulty of finding food and housing, some Jews who had previously escaped returned to the camp. On 29 May 1944 another group of 60 Jews arrived from the Corropoli internment camp. During the night of 7-8 June a group of partisans broke into the camp calling for its immediate and complete evacuation. On 14 June the German troops started their retreat. On 16 June German soldiers killed a Jewish refugee, who had been discovered hidden in a cottage not far from the village. On 19 June 1944 Servigliano was freed.

=== Post-war ===
After the liberation, on 22 June the camp was reoccupied by the Maltese prisoners from Tripoli. On 17 July 1944 they were embarked for Tripoli. As a refugee retention centre, the camp remained active from September 1945 until 1955. Between 40,000 and 50,000 refugees from Istria, Libya and Ethiopia went through this camp.

== Today ==
After 1955 the area was completely abandoned. During the 1970s, the barracks, now dilapidated, were demolished and a sports centre was built. Some ruins remain, such as a perimeter wall and some of the houses where guards used to stay.

Two commemorative plaques were placed near the former site: the first was laid by the British and American prisoners who escaped from the camp after 8 September 1943; the second in memory of the deportees and those who were saved thanks to the help offered to them by local families.

== See also ==
- Holocaust in Italy
