= Santa Lucia di Capradosso =

Church in Rotella, Italy

Santa Lucia is a gothic-style Roman Catholic church located at Piazza Umberto I in the hamlet of Capradosso, a frazione of the town of Rotella, in the province of Ascoli Piceno, region of Marche, Italy. It is also known as the Santa Lucia a Capradosso.

== History and description ==
This church houses a Gothic reliquary from the 15th century, attributed to Alessandro Battista da Marcuccio, a pupil of Pietro Vannini. The interior is decorated with polychrome baroque stucco decorations. The crypt is dedicated to St Pontico. A canvas in a lunette, depicting the Madonna of the Rosary above donors of the Gabrielli family is attributed to a follower of Simone de Magistris.
