= Madonna delle Grazie, Gualdo =

Catholic church in Macerata province, Italy

Coordinates: 43°04′06.4″N 13°20′23.6″E

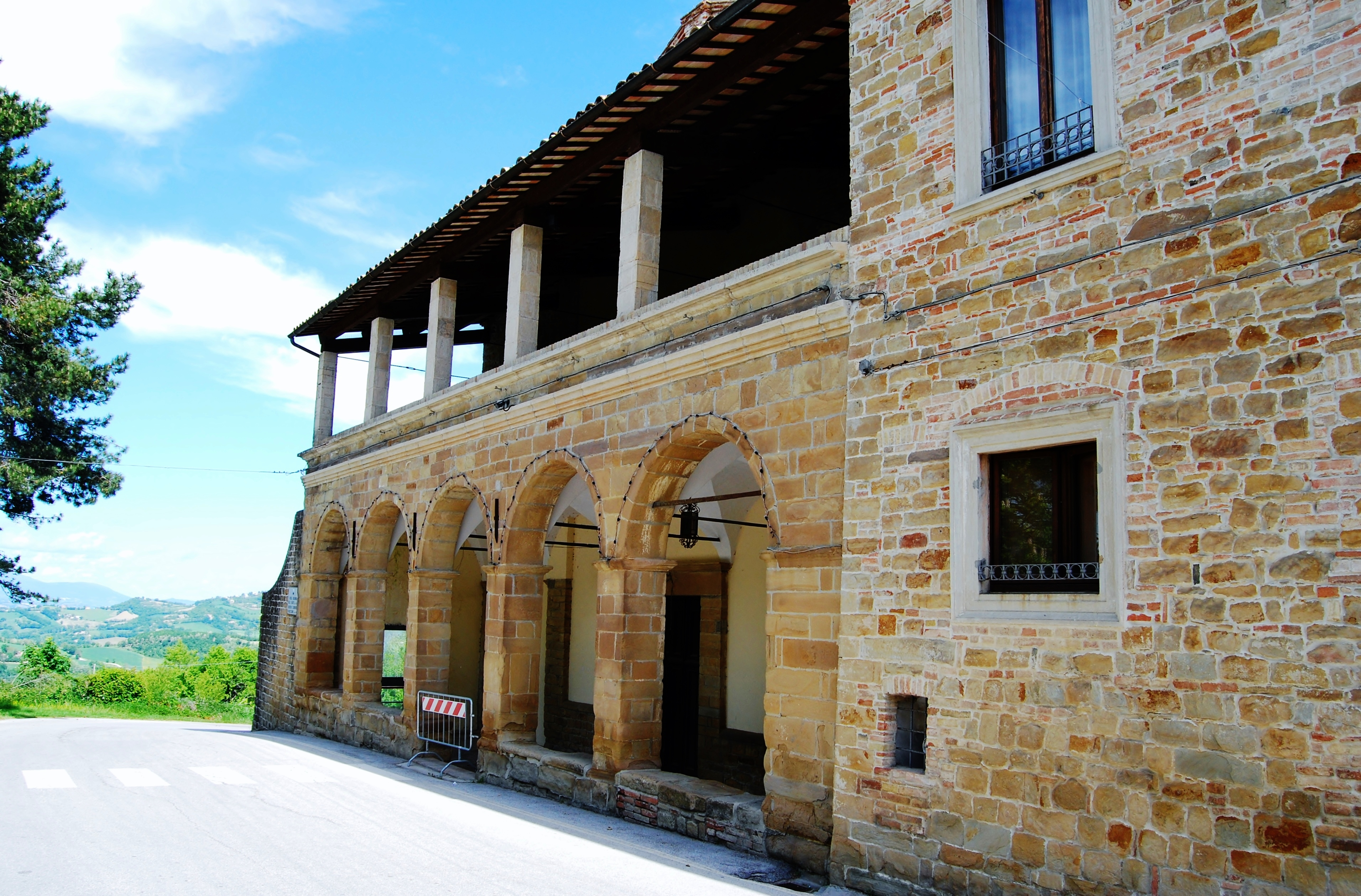

The church of Madonna delle Grazie is a Roman Catholic Marian shrine located in the town limits of Gualdo, province of Macerata, in the region of Marche, Italy.

== History ==
Founded in the 12th century, the shrine has undergone numerous refurbishments. It conserves a venerated 12th-century fresco depicting the Madonna delle Grazie. the Portico has a two-story portico, the base with stone rounded arches. In the 16th century, a Franciscan monastery arose adjacent to the church, but was abandoned by the Frati Minori after the Napoleonic invasions. The cloister has arcades around a central well.

== See also ==
- Catholic Church in Italy
