= Penna San Giovanni =

- Comune
- Comune di Penna San Giovanni
- Coat of arms

- Location within Italy Location within Marche
- Coordinates: 43°3′N 13°26′E
- Country: Italy
- Region: Marche
- Province: Macerata (MC)

Government
  - Mayor: Emanuele Crisostomi

Area
  - Total: 28 km^{2} (11 sq mi)
- Elevation: 630 m (2,070 ft)

Population (31 December 2010)
  - Total: 1,176
  - Density: 42/km^{2} (110/sq mi)
- Demonym: Pennesi
- Time zone: UTC+1 (CET)
  - Summer (DST): UTC+2 (CEST)
- Postal code: 62020
- Dialing code: 0733
- Patron saint: St. John the Baptist
- Saint day: 29 August - 24 June
- Website: Official website

Penna San Giovanni is a comune (municipality) in the Province of Macerata in the Italian region Marche, located about 60 kilometres (37 mi) south of Ancona and about 30 kilometres (19 mi) south of Macerata.

Penna San Giovanni borders the following municipalities: Amandola, Falerone, Gualdo, Monte San Martino, Sant'Angelo in Pontano, Servigliano.

Penna is an ancient hill top town. There are half a dozen churches and a small early 18th-century theatre, Teatro Flora. At the very top of the town are the remains of the ancient fort with a panoramic view up to the mountains and looking out at the surrounding hilltop towns. In the summer the municipality organizes events on numerous evenings, including the Festa della Polenta and Otto Giorni Di Un Linguaggio Volgare.
