= Rotella, Marche =

Rotella
- Comune
- Comune di Rotella
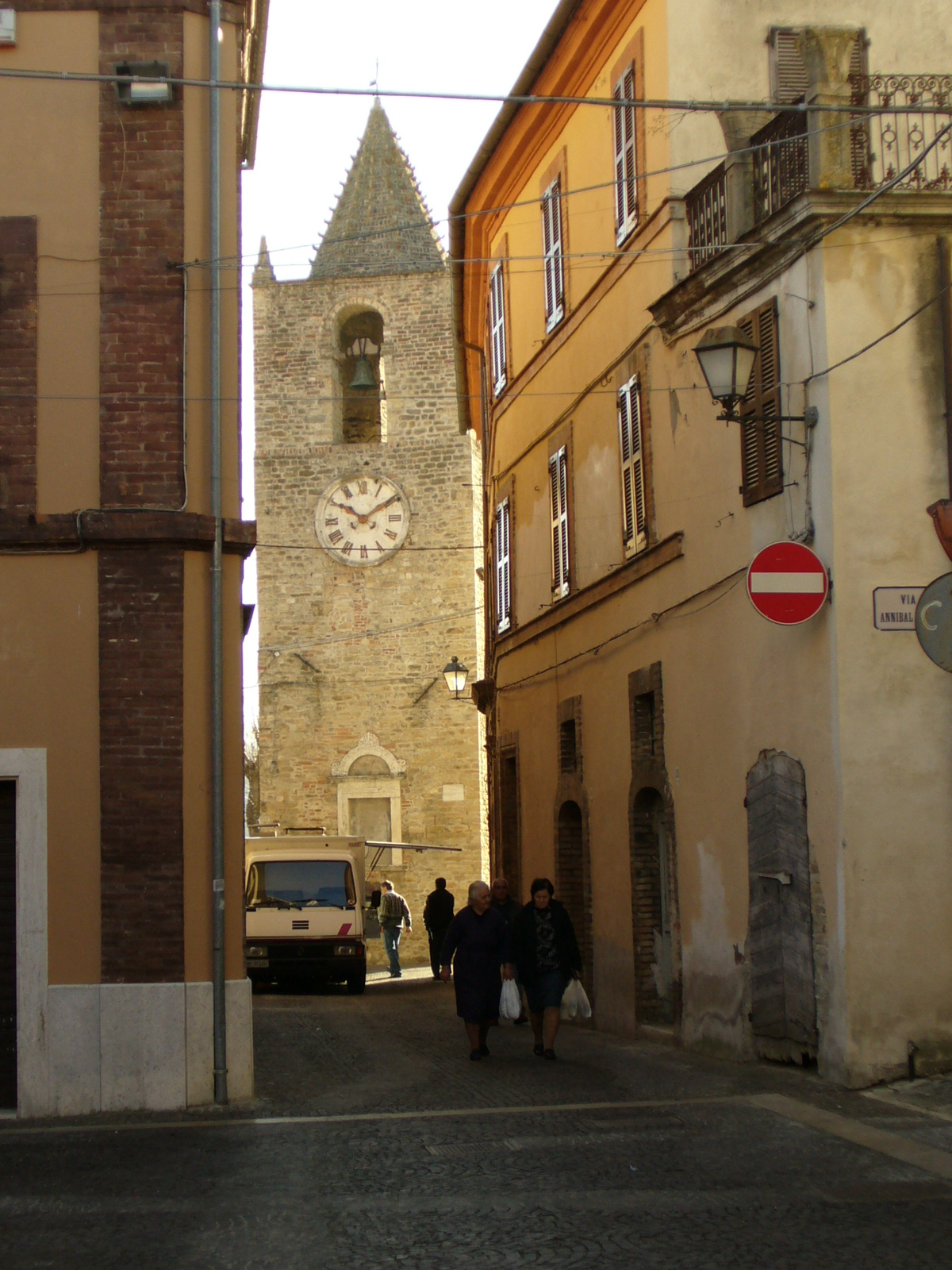
- Clock Tower

- Location within Italy Location within Marche
- Coordinates: 42°57′N 13°34′E
- Country: Italy
- Region: Marche
- Province: Province of Ascoli Piceno (AP)
- Frazioni: Casteltel di Croce, Capradosso, Poggio Canoso

Government
  - Mayor: Domenico Gentili

Area
  - Total: 27.2 km^{2} (10.5 sq mi)
- Elevation: 395 m (1,296 ft)

Population (2005)
  - Total: 985
  - Density: 36.2/km^{2} (93.8/sq mi)
- Demonym: Rotellesi
- Time zone: UTC+1 (CET)
  - Summer (DST): UTC+2 (CEST)
- Postal code: 63030
- Dialing code: 0736
- Patron saint: Lawrence of Rome
- Saint day: 10 August
- Website: Official website

Rotella is a comune (municipality) in the Province of Ascoli Piceno in the Italian region Marche, located about 70 km (43 mi) south of Ancona and about 11 km (6.8 mi) north of Ascoli Piceno. As of 31 December 2005, it has a population of 985 and an area of 27.2 km^{2} (10.5 sq mi).

The municipality of Rotella contains the frazioni (subdivisions, mainly villages and hamlets) Castel di Croce, Capradosso, and Poggio Canoso.

Rotella borders the following municipalities: Ascoli Piceno, Castignano, Force, Montedinove, Montelparo, Venarotta.

Among the prominent public buildings in Rotella are:

- Torre Civica dell'Orologio
- Museo Piccolomini, Rotella
- Santi Maria e Lorenzo
- Sanctuary of the Madonna della Consolazione, Montemisio
- Santa Lucia di Capradosso
- Santa Lucia di Poggio Canoso
- San Severino
- Santa Viviana or Chiesa delle Icone

== Demographic evolution ==
Historical population

Year	Pop.	±%
1861	2,369	—
1871	2,301	−2.9%
1881	2,270	−1.3%
1901	2,561	+12.8%
1911	2,806	+9.6%

Year	Pop.	±%
1921	2,799	−0.2%
1931	2,816	+0.6%
1936	2,939	+4.4%
1951	3,018	+2.7%
1961	2,257	−25.2%

Year	Pop.	±%
1971	1,368	−39.4%
1981	1,112	−18.7%
1991	1,058	−4.9%
2001	1,000	−5.5%

Source: Data from ISTAT
