= Corropoli internment camp =

World War II Internment Camp

Campo di internamento di Corropoli
- Concentration camp
- Location within Italy
- Coordinates: 42°49′1″N 13°49′59″E
- Location: Corropoli
- Operated by: Italy
- Operational: 1941
- Inmates: Political and Civilian
- Liberated by: 1944

Corropoli internment camp, in Corropoli, in the province of Teramo, was one of several internment camps set up by the fascist government following the entry of Italy into World War II, to sit foreigners and anti-fascists. It operated from January 1941 to May 1944, with a maximum capacity of 150 people. Irredentist Slavic and Italian communists were interned and after September 8, 1943 it also served as a concentration camp for Jews.

== History ==
In June 1940 the convent of the Fathers of Celestini Abbey (owned by the City of Corropoli, about a mile away from the village) was approved as a location for the camp. Between 1940 and 1943, the Commissioners of Public Safety: Guido Trevisani, Mario Maiello, John Santamaria, Carmine Medici, Francesco Alongi, Carmine Sanzo and Mario Gagliardi, administered the camp. The supervision was entrusted to the police and health matters to Dr. Gaetano D'Aristotle. The camp was not active immediately since the building required major renovations. During February 1941 the first inmates arrived. Before becoming an internment camp, the structure was identified as a TB health centre. There was pressure to restore the building to its original destination, therefore on May 4, 1942 the building was cleared and its occupants transferred to other camps. However, on June 16, 1942 the Ministry of the Interior imposed the reopening of the camp, which housed inmates with various nationalities: Slavic, Greek, English, etc. reaching a capacity of 165 units. As with a few other Italian camps, this one received complaints about the excessive freedom the inmates enjoyed. This meant among other things that in June 1943 the camp was enclosed with barbed wire. After 8 September 1943 several inmates were freed by Yugoslav partisans. In December of that year, however, 130 people were still in the camp, now controlled by authorities of the Italian Social Republic and inserted as a link in the complex system of Nazi deportation. On February 1, 1944, 69 Jews arrived from Nereto internment camp. In May 1944, 60 of them were to be transferred to the Servigliano prison camp to be deported. Corropoli finally closed at the end of May 1944 with the allied approach and its last inmates were transferred to other camps in northern Italy.

== See also ==
- Holocaust in Italy
