= Teatro Flora, Penna San Giovanni =

Italian performing arts theater

Coordinates: 43°03′24.7″N 13°25′31.0″E

The Flora Theater is a small 18th-century performing arts theater located in the Palazzo dei Priori in center of the town of Penna San Giovanni, province of Macerata, region of Marche, Italy.

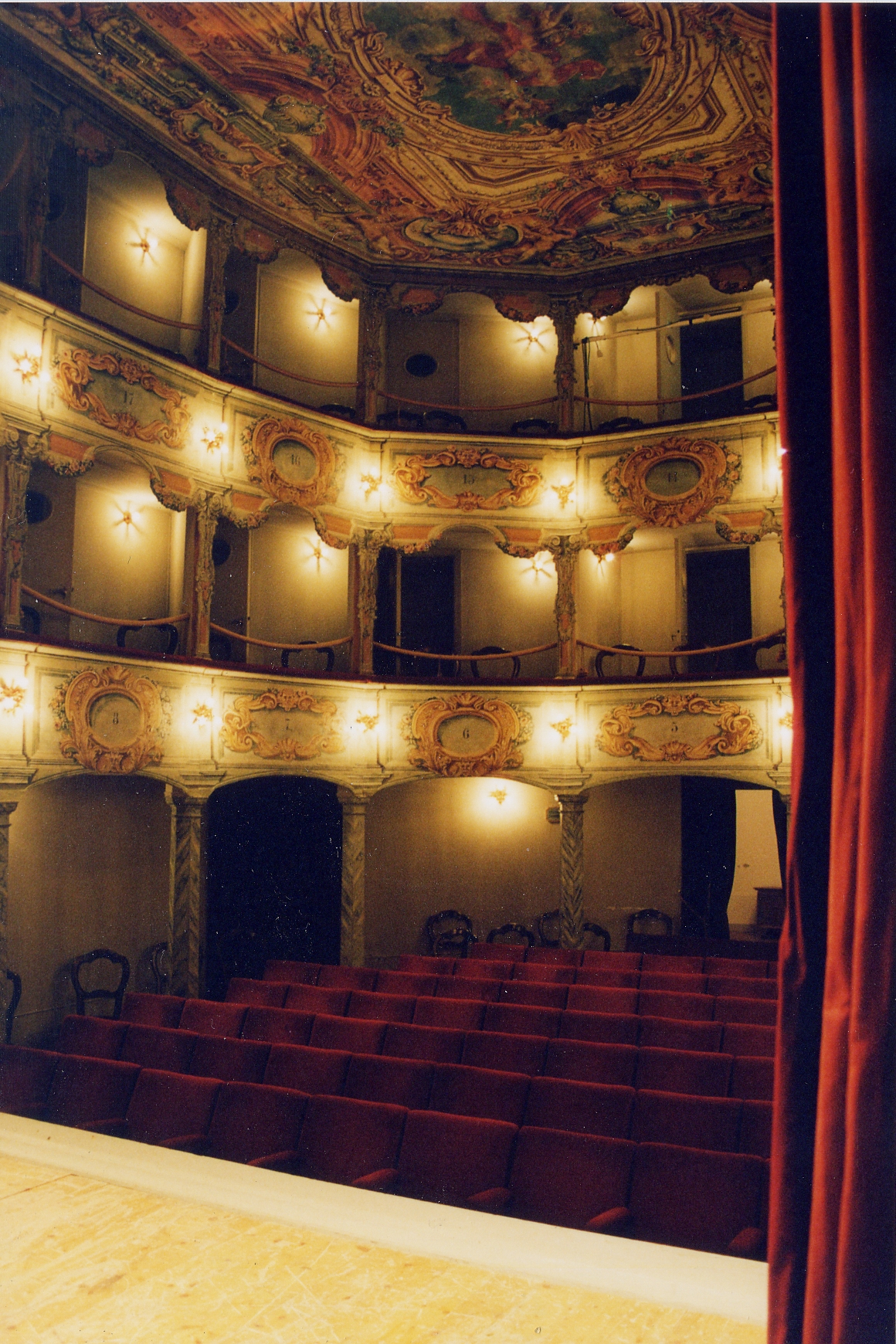
Seating for theater

== History ==
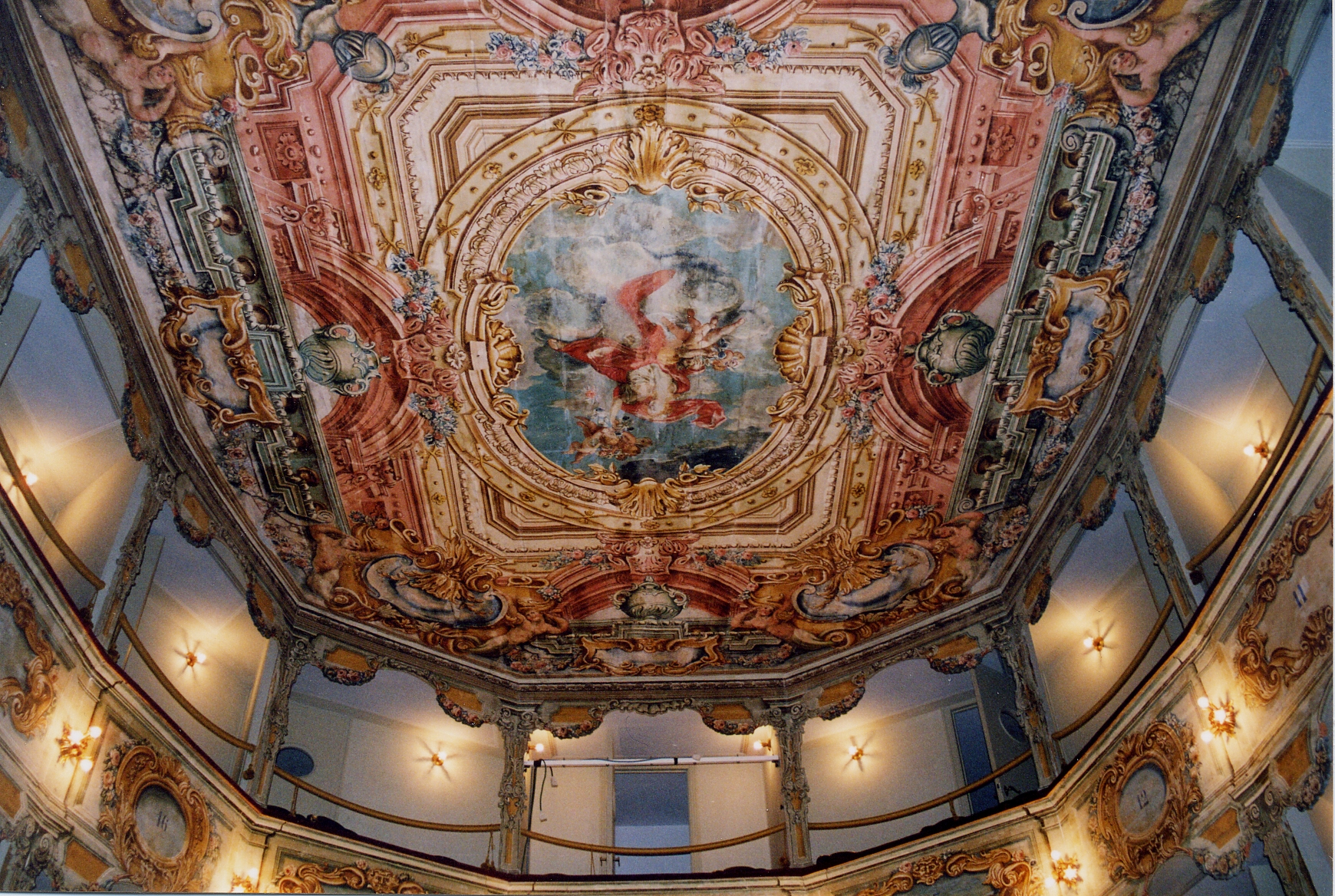
Central ceiling fresco of Flora by Liozzi.

The nucleus for the theater was formed by a Società del Teatro, founded in 1780, and composed of ten condomini (owners) in the town. They utilized this space in the town palace to build this theater with a frescoed wooden roof, above ground seating and two floors of theater boxes. The decoration is an elaborate rococo décor on wood, with wooden columns painted as faux marble. The theater presently sits about 100 persons. In the twentieth century, for years the theater was abandoned and threatened with destruction. In 1985 it was designated as a historic national treasure and recently subsequently restored.

The painted decoration was completed Antonio Liozzi, who painted the central ceiling fresco of the goddess Flora, as well as the mouldings and frames.
