= Monte San Martino =

Municipality in Italy

- Comune
- Comune di Monte San Martino
- Coat of arms

- Location within Italy Location within Marche
- Coordinates: 43°2′N 13°26′E
- Country: Italy
- Region: Marche
- Province: Macerata (MC)

Government
  - Mayor: Matteo Pompei

Area
  - Total: 18.5 km^{2} (7.1 sq mi)
- Elevation: 603 m (1,978 ft)

Population (31 December 2008)
  - Total: 808
  - Density: 43.7/km^{2} (113/sq mi)
- Time zone: UTC+1 (CET)
  - Summer (DST): UTC+2 (CEST)
- Postal code: 62020
- Dialing code: 0733
- Website: Official website

Monte San Martino is a comune (municipality) in the Province of Macerata in the Italian region Marche, located about 70 kilometres (43 mi) south of Ancona and about 30 kilometres (19 mi) south of Macerata. There are 808 people in the village.

The economy is mostly based on agriculture.

The city houses artworks by Vittore and Carlo Crivelli, Girolamo di Giovanni da Camerino and Vincenzo Pagani.

The Monte San Martino Trust was founded in 1989 by J. Keith Killby, a former prisoner of war at Servigliano nearby, together with other veterans of the Second World War. The Trust awards English-language study bursaries to Italians, aged 18 to 25, in recognition of the courage and sacrifice of the Italian country people who rescued thousands of escaping Allied PoWs after the Armistice in 1943.

== Sport ==
In Monte San Martino there is a football team (ASD Monte San Martino) that plays in the last category of Italian football. There is also an amateur futsal team: ASD Athletic Molino.

== Schools ==
There are three schools in the village: a kindergarten, a primary school and a secondary school, in these schools in all there are just over a hundred students.
