= Natale Ricci =

Italian painter

Natale Ricci (1677–1754) was an Italian painter. He was a pupil of Carlo Maratti, and a native of Fermo, Papal States. He practised in Italy in the 18th century. He is part of the family of painters that includes Ubaldo (1669–1731), Filippo (1715–1793), and Alessandro Ricci (1750–1829).
