= Santa Maria della Misericordia, Monteleone di Fermo =

Church building in Monteleone di Fermo, Italy

Santa Maria della Misericordia is a Romanesque-style, Roman Catholic church located just outside the town of Monteleone di Fermo, in the province of Fermo, region of Marche, Italy.

== History ==
The church began as a circular chapel with a small dome, dedicated to the Madonna of the Misericordia, a Marian veneration meant specially to spare a community from the bubonic plague. The chapel appears to have been erected by 1450. The apse was frescoed with a depiction of the Madonna with St John the Baptist and St Catherine sheltering the faithful with her mantle.

The chapel of the crucifix had a wooden icon, now found in the parish church of San Marone Martire in town. The church was reconsecrated in 1522, but by the 17th-century it had suffered water damage. It also contains a wooden statue depicting St Roch and St Sebastians also patrons of those afflicted by the plague.

It houses a large fresco depicting the Last Judgement (1548) by Orfeo Presutti, a pupil of Vincenzo Pagani.
