= Monte Rinaldo =

Comune di Monte Rinaldo
- Comune
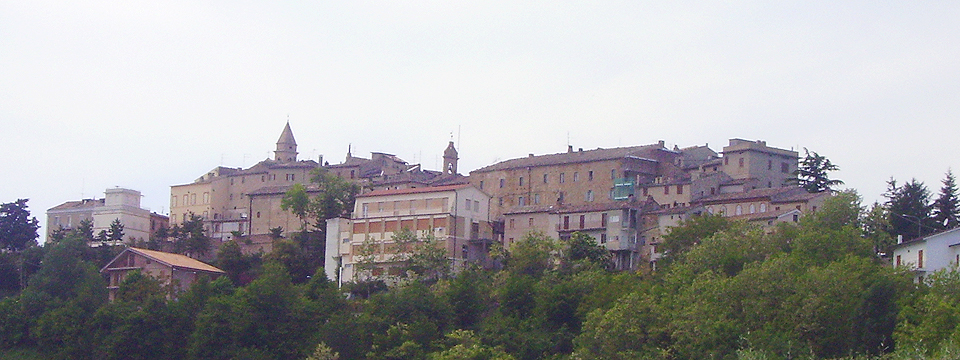

- Location within Italy Location within Marche
- Coordinates: 43°2′N 13°35′E
- Country: Italy
- Region: Marche
- Province: Fermo (FM)

Area
  - Total: 7.8 km^{2} (3.0 sq mi)
- Elevation: 485 m (1,591 ft)

Population (2018-01-01)
  - Total: 359
  - Density: 46/km^{2} (120/sq mi)
- Time zone: UTC+1 (CET)
  - Summer (DST): UTC+2 (CEST)
- Postal code: 63020
- Dialing code: 0734
- Website: comune.monterinaldo.fm.it

Monte Rinaldo is a comune (municipality) in the Province of Fermo in the Marche region of Italy, located about 30 km (19 mi) north of Ascoli Piceno and 25 km (16 mi) west of Fermo.

== History ==
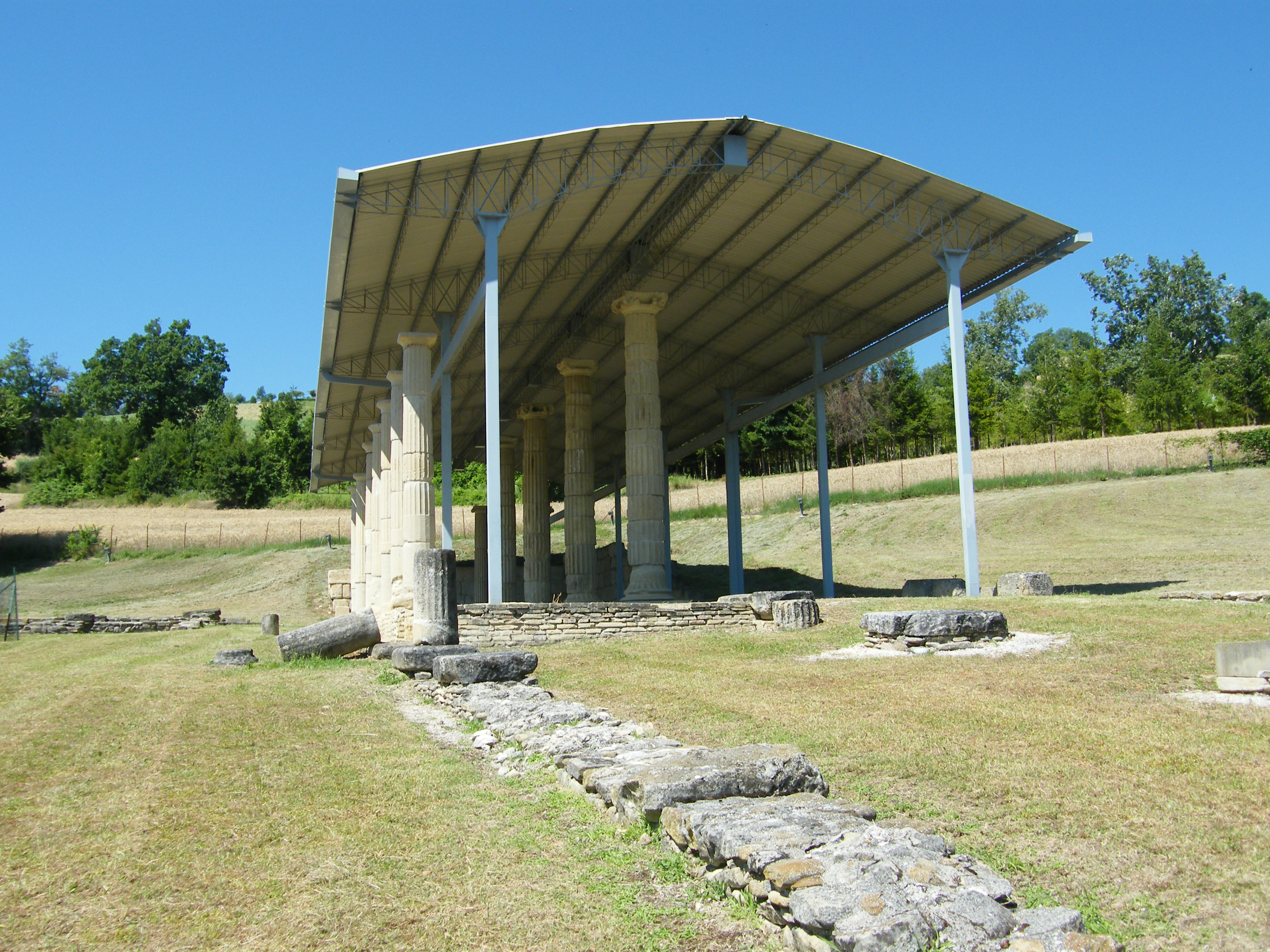
Portico of the sanctuary of Jupiter

In the first millennium BC the Piceni colonised the area.

Following various alliances with the Romans and the Third Samnite War in the 3rd century BC the territory of Picenum gradually passed under the control of Rome. Latin settlers arrived nearby after the establishment of the colonia of Firmum in 264 BC.

The monumental Hellenistic-Roman sanctuary of Jupiter located today in the La Cuma area 0.5 km (0.31 mi) south of the present town was built in the 1st half of the 2nd century BC. The sanctuary was in region lacking in towns and was the only public monument of the Aso Valley. It was thus the focus of attraction of Roman colonists living nearby who used it also for the administration of justice and other civil or commercial purposes.

After several building phases it was abandoned in the first half of the 1st century BC and replaced by a farm.

The Roman settlement was located near the Indaco river.

In the Lombard age, its position encouraged expansion of agriculture and commerce.

== The ancient sanctuary ==
The 1st phase of the sanctuary from the 1st half of the 2nd century BC consisted of a temple of Jupiter on a podium in the centre of a square piazza. The temple had 4 frontal columns (tetrastyle). The visible part of the roof was decorated with painted architectural terracottas while the pediment had a group of terracotta statues narrating a story dominated by Jupiter. The piazza was fronted by a portico with two colonnades, the outer one of the Doric order facing into the piazza and an inner central Ionic one dividing the portico into two aisles. The back wall also acted as terracing for the slope behind.

Soon after the middle of the 2nd century BC, the sanctuary was redeveloped, possibly following a partial collapse after an earthquake, in the style of Hellenistic sanctuaries elsewhere in the Mediterranean. The eastern portico was added with a series of shops, indicating that the sanctuary was commercial as well as religious. The temple was rebuilt on a podium which used architectural decorations of the previous building as a form of ritual. Many inscriptions of Iovei Sacrum (sacred Jupiter) scratched on black glazed cups and seals identified the deity of the temple, together with architectural elements decorated with lightning, a typical symbol of Jupiter.

At the end of the 2nd c. BC a second sacellum (small temple), dedicated to Hercules, was built in the northern corner of the piazza.

In the first century BC two rooms were added to the sides of the main portico each including three Ionic columns.

== Excavations ==
The sanctuary was discovered in 1957 and rebuilt in the 1960s. Since 2016 excavations have been led by the University of Bologna and the British School at Rome.

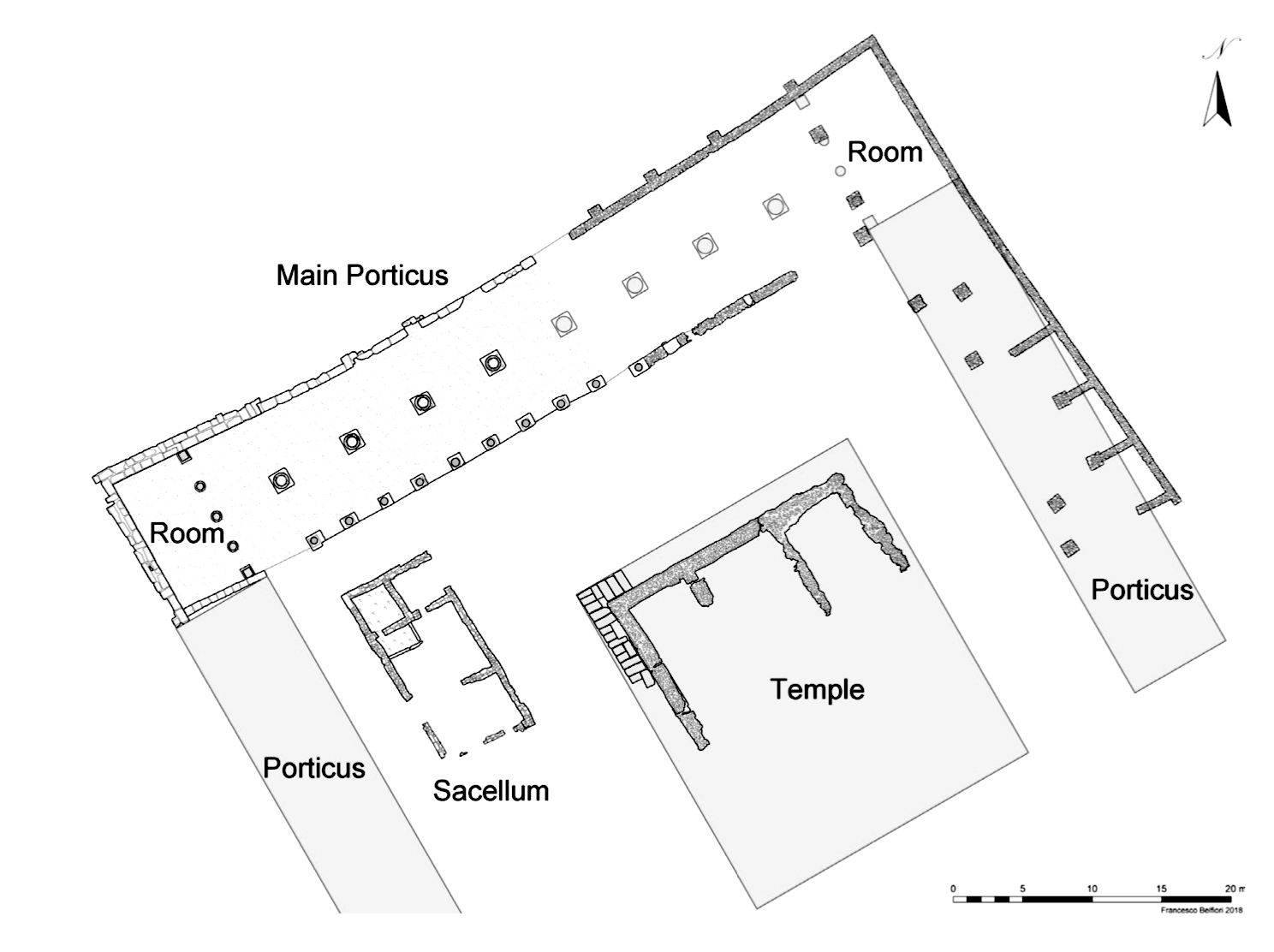
Plan of Sanctuary of Hercules
