= Ubaldo Ricci =

Italian painter

Ubaldo Ricci (1669-1731) was an Italian painter of the late-Baroque who practised in Italy in the 18th century. He was born in Fermo and trained in Rome under Giovanni Francesco Romanelli and Carlo Maratta . He is part of the family of painters that includes Natale (1677-1754), Filippo (1715-1793), and Alessandro Ricci (1750-1829). Filippo, son of Natale, and grandson of Ubaldo, studied in Bologna under Donato Creti, and later in Rome under Corrado Giaquinto.
