= Sanctulus of Nursia =

Italian Roman Catholic saint

Saint Sanctulus of Nursia
- Residence: Nursia
- Died: ~593
- Feast: 15 December

Sanctulus of Nursia(6th century) is a priest mentioned by Pope Gregory the Great in his work called Dialogues (Dialogi de vita et miraculis patrum italicorum).

Gregory said of Sanctulus:

Ignorant I am not, that this venerable man Sanctulus could scant read well, and that he knew not the precepts of the law: yet because charity is the fulfilling of the law, by loving God and his neighbour, he kept the whole law: and that which outwardly lacked in knowledge, did inwardly by charity live in his soul.

The feast day of Saint Sanctulus is observed on 15 December in the Catholic Church.
