= Giovanni Battista di Giovannofrio =

Italian painter

Giovanni Battista di Giovannofrio, also known as Giovanni Battista di Norcia, was an Italian painter, active in the Renaissance style. He was the brother of the painter Giacomo Giovannofrio.

He painted a fresco depicting an Enthroned Madonna between Saints Claudio (or Eligius) and St Antony Abbot, and a donor while above is a Coronation of the Virgin, dated 1497, and painted for the church of Sant'Agostino in Norcia. He also painted the Glory of St Anthony of Padua (1501) for the church of San Francesco in Norcia.
