= Madonna di Loreto, Spoleto =

Church building in Spoleto, Italy

Coordinates: 42.7328°N 12.7252°E

The Church of the Madonna di Loreto is a renaissance-style, Roman Catholic church located in Spoleto, Province of Perugia, Umbria, Italy.

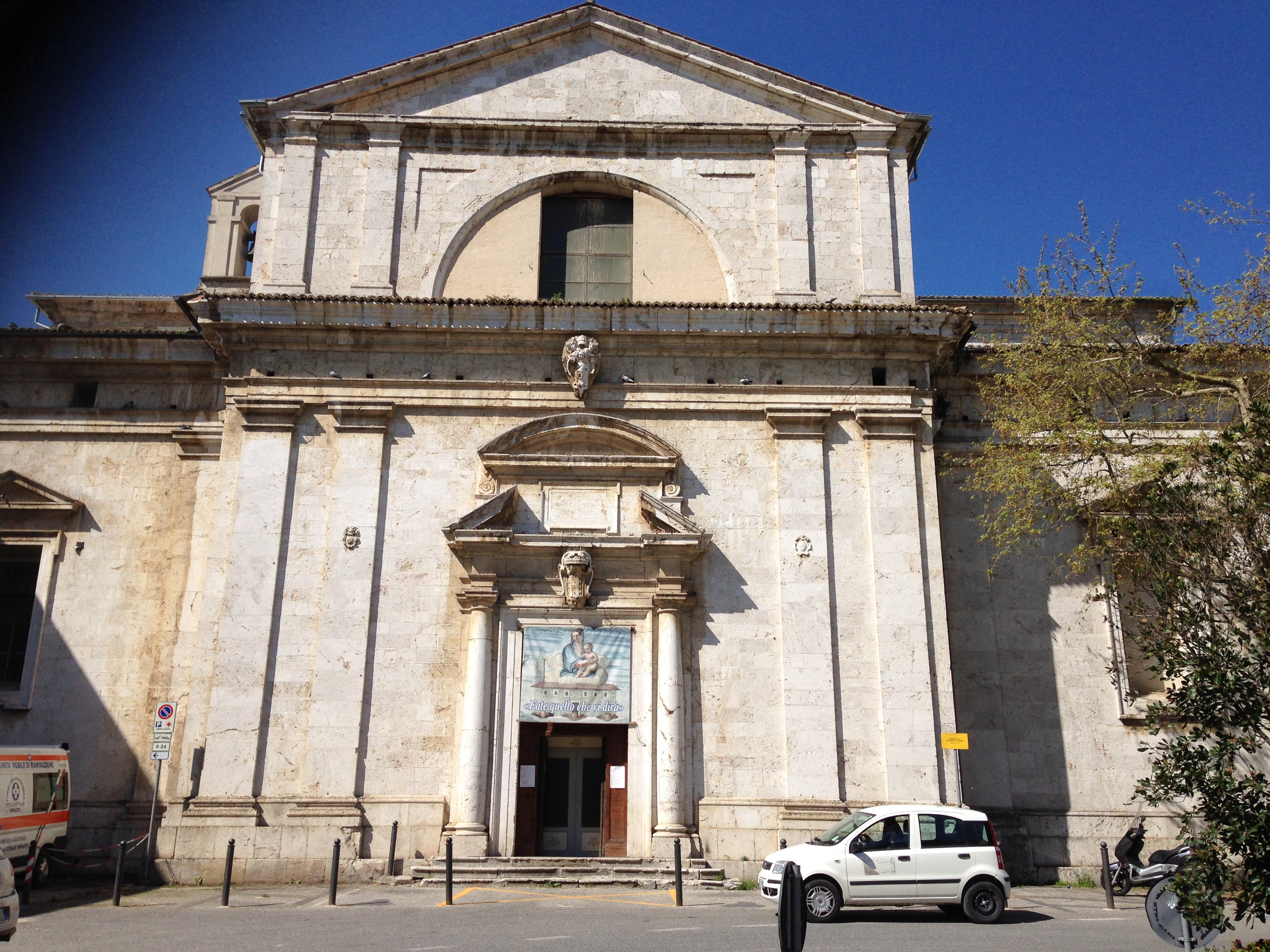
Facade

== History ==
Construction of the church was begun in 1572 designed by Annibale de' Lippi of Florence. It stands near the Porta San Matteo, also called di Loreto. The site was chosen because it had housed an aedicule or chapel with the fresco of the Maestà (1537) painted by Jacopo Santoro da Giuliana, also called Jacopo Siculo. After the earthquake of 1571, veneration of the image increased. Many claimed the image had miraculous movements of the eyes causing the seismic events to stop. A church was thus erected around the image. The church was built in an unusual nearly symmetric Greek cross layout. The entrance portal was completed in 1662. The interior had a number of canvases by Giovanni Baglione, but these are now in the town art gallery. The interior houses the chapel of the Maestà, paralleling the englobed Santa Casa di Loreto.
