= Jacopo Siculo =

Italian painter

Jacopo Siculo, also known as Giacomo Santoro da Giuliana (1490-1544) was an Italian painter of the Renaissance, mainly active in Umbria.

== Biography ==
He was born in Sicily. By 1519, he was in Rome working under Baldassarre Peruzzi. He likely abandoned Rome after the Sack of Rome in 1527, and settled in Spoleto, where he married one of the daughters of Giovanni di Pietro (lo Spagna).

He painted frescoes (ca. 1535) for the Chapel of the Assumption in the Spoleto Cathedral. He also painted a fresco altarpiece for the Spinelli Chapel in the church of Santa Maria de Loreto in Spoleto. For the church in Brizio, outside of Spoleto, he painted an altarpied and frescoes in the presbytery (1541-2). In Bettona, he painted a Virgin in Glory with Saints altarpiece (1547), now in the Pinacoteca Civica. In Norcia, he painted an altarpiece for the Franciscan Convent of the Annunziata, depicting the Coronation of the Virgin (1541) and other panels, now in the city museum.

== Gallery ==
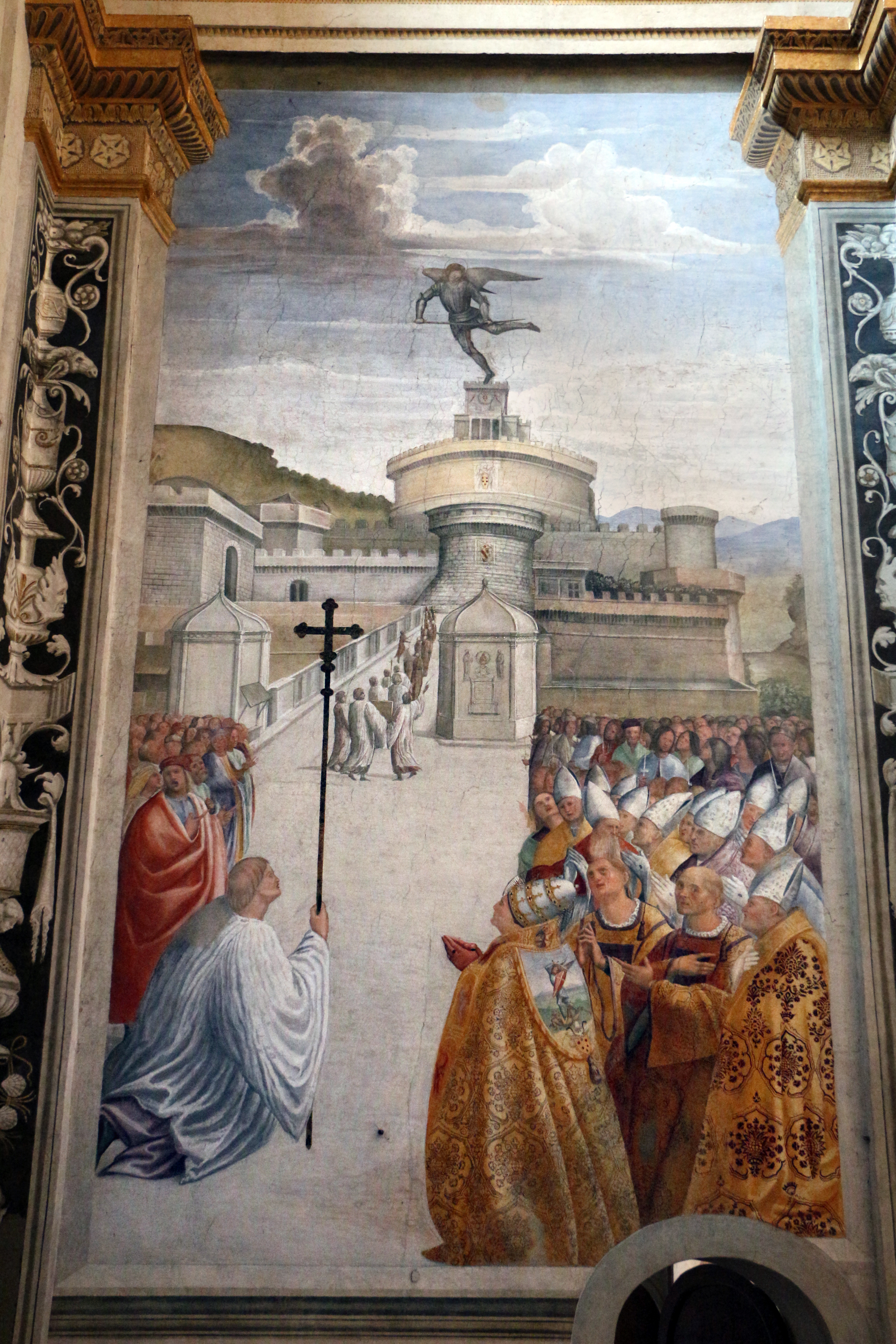
Apparition of St. Michael on Castel Sant'Angelo

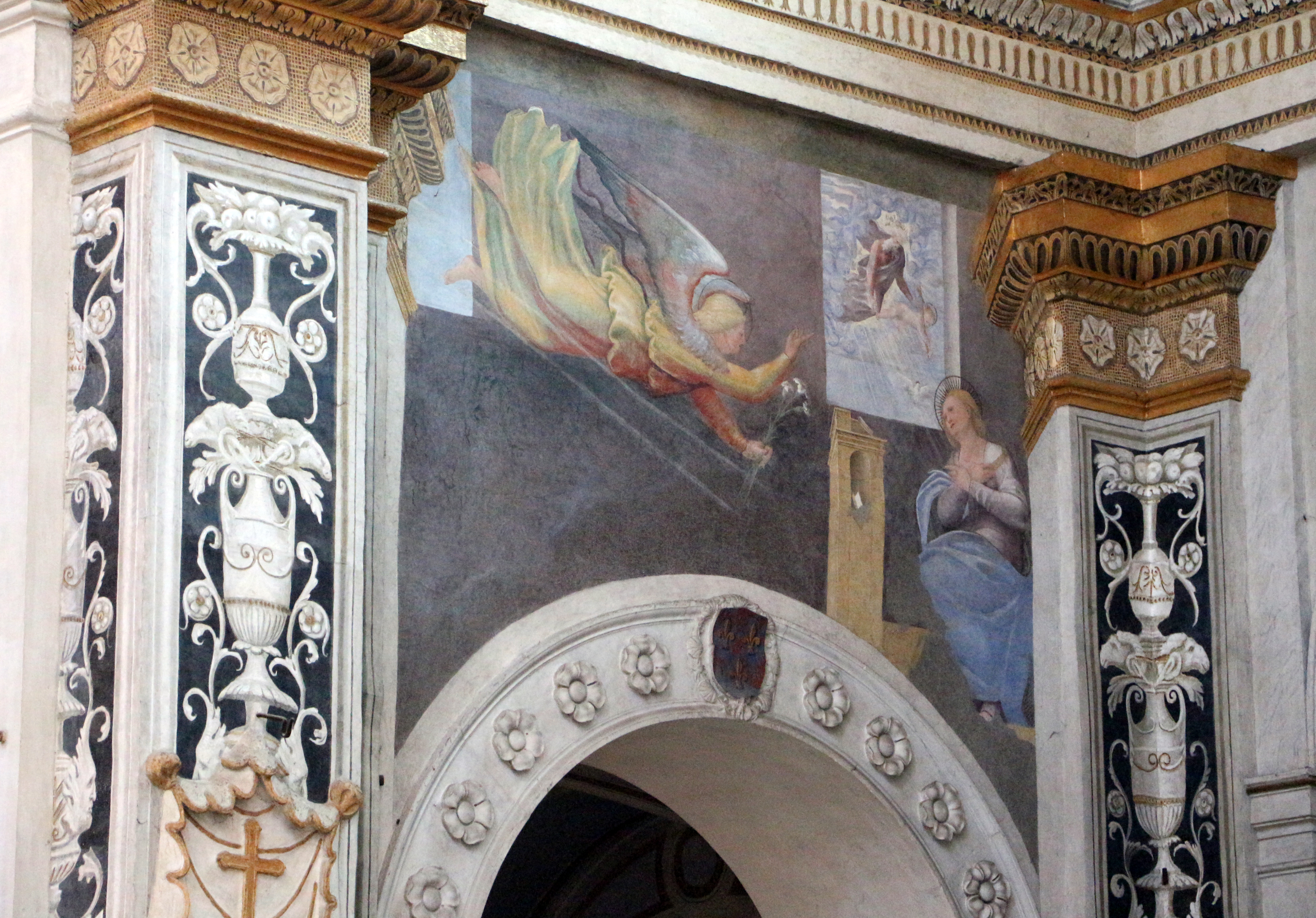
Annunciation

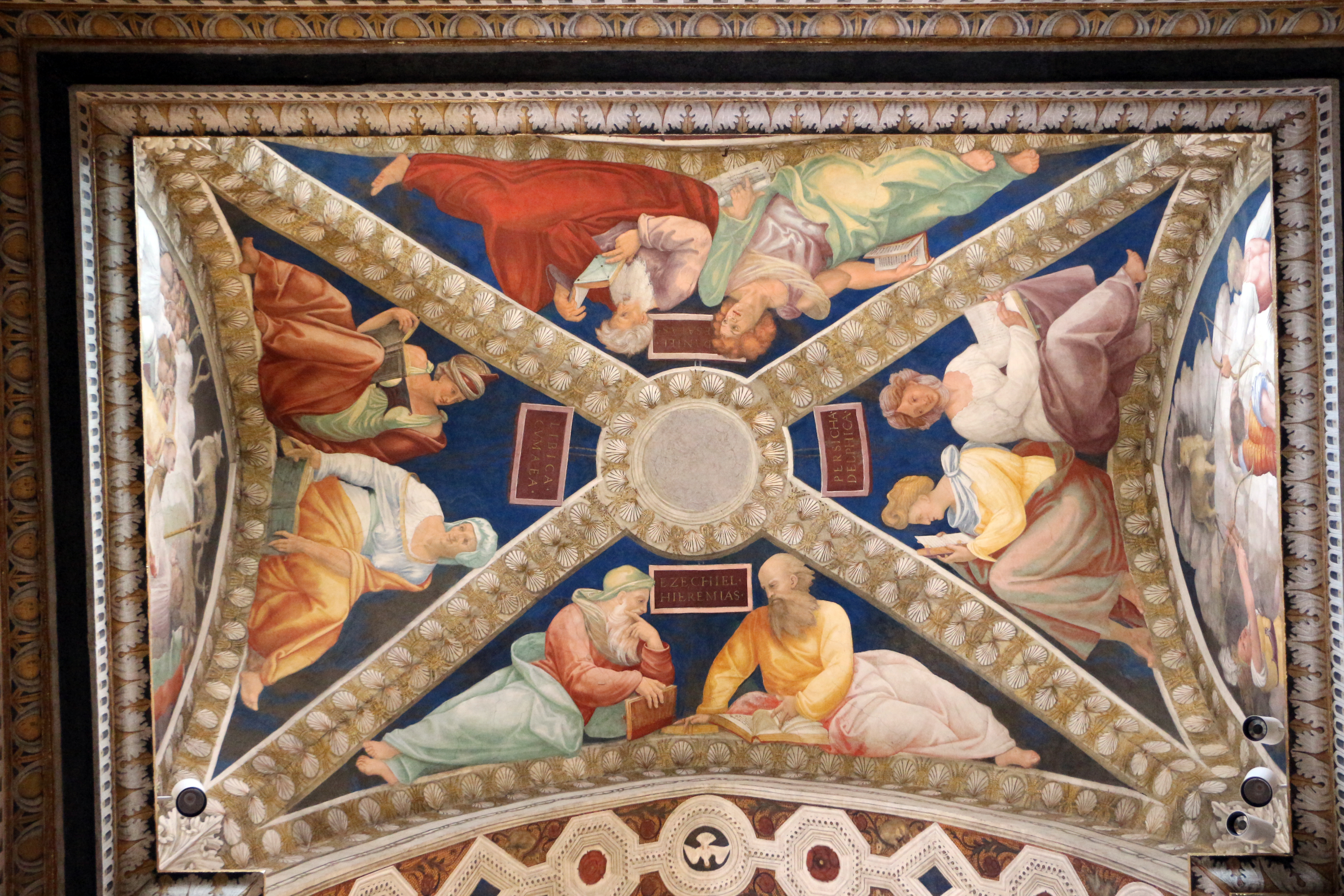
Trinità dei Monti (Rome) - Chapel of Saint Michael

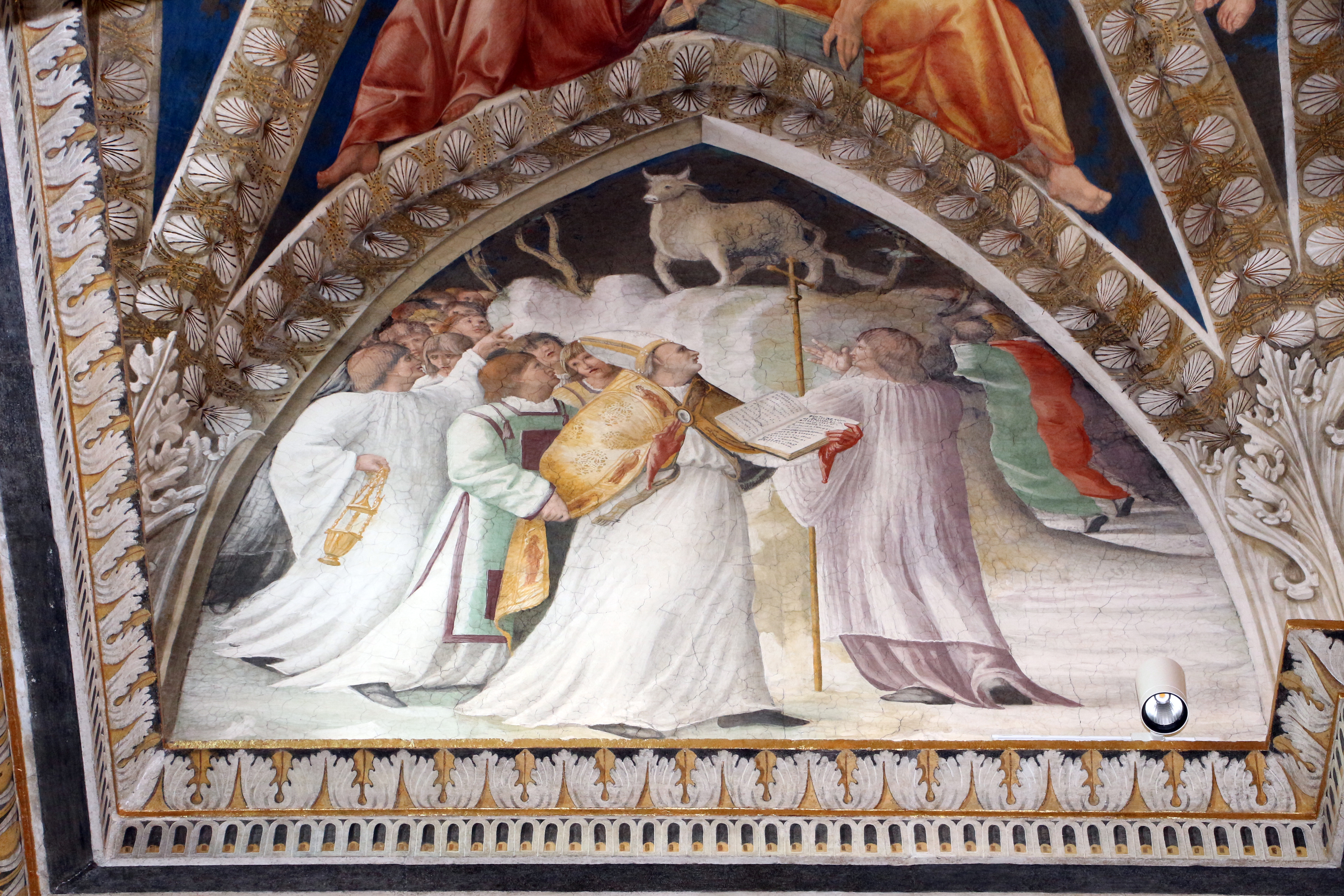
Sanctuary of Monte Sant'Angelo

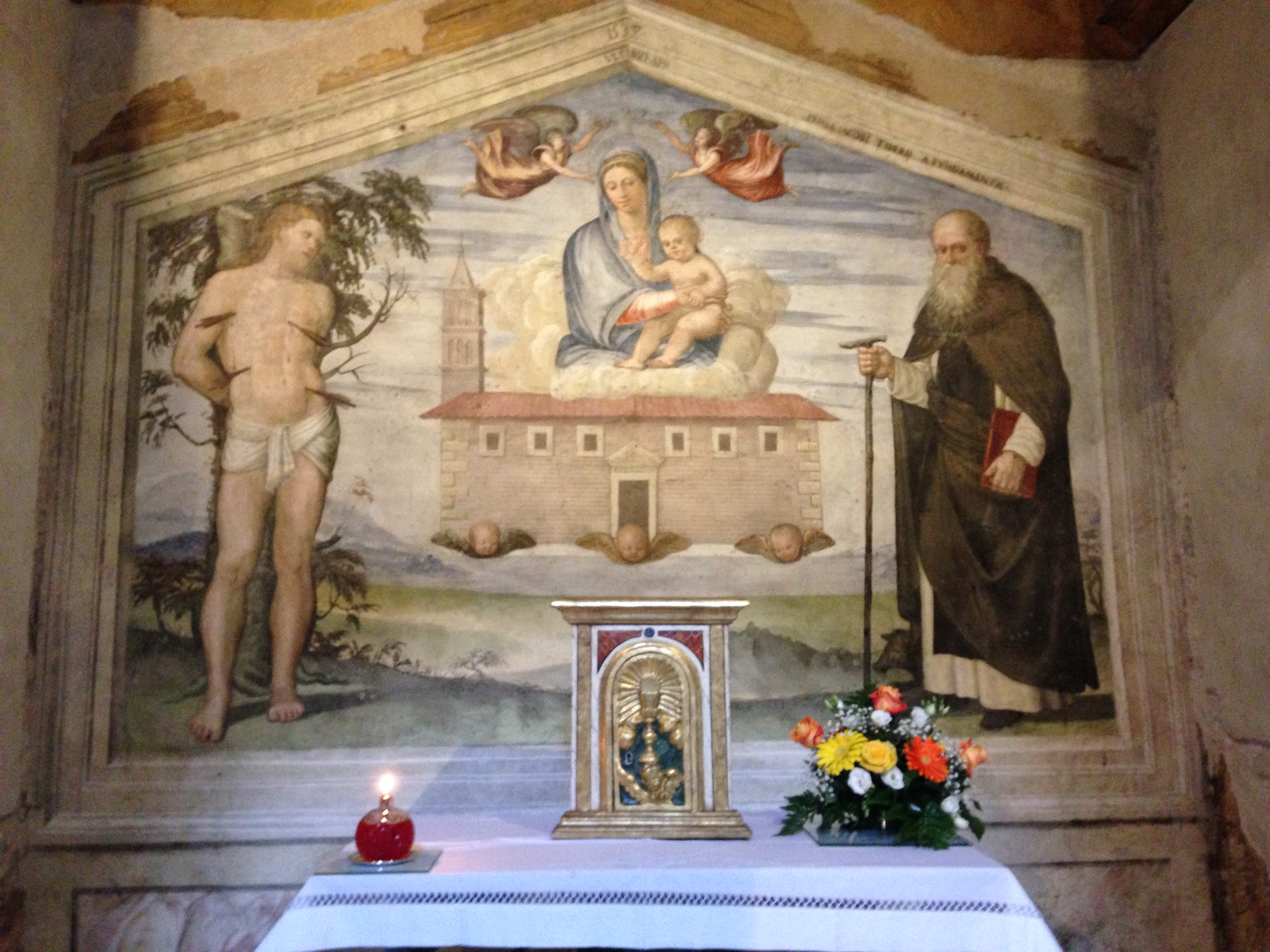
Santuario Madonna di Loreto

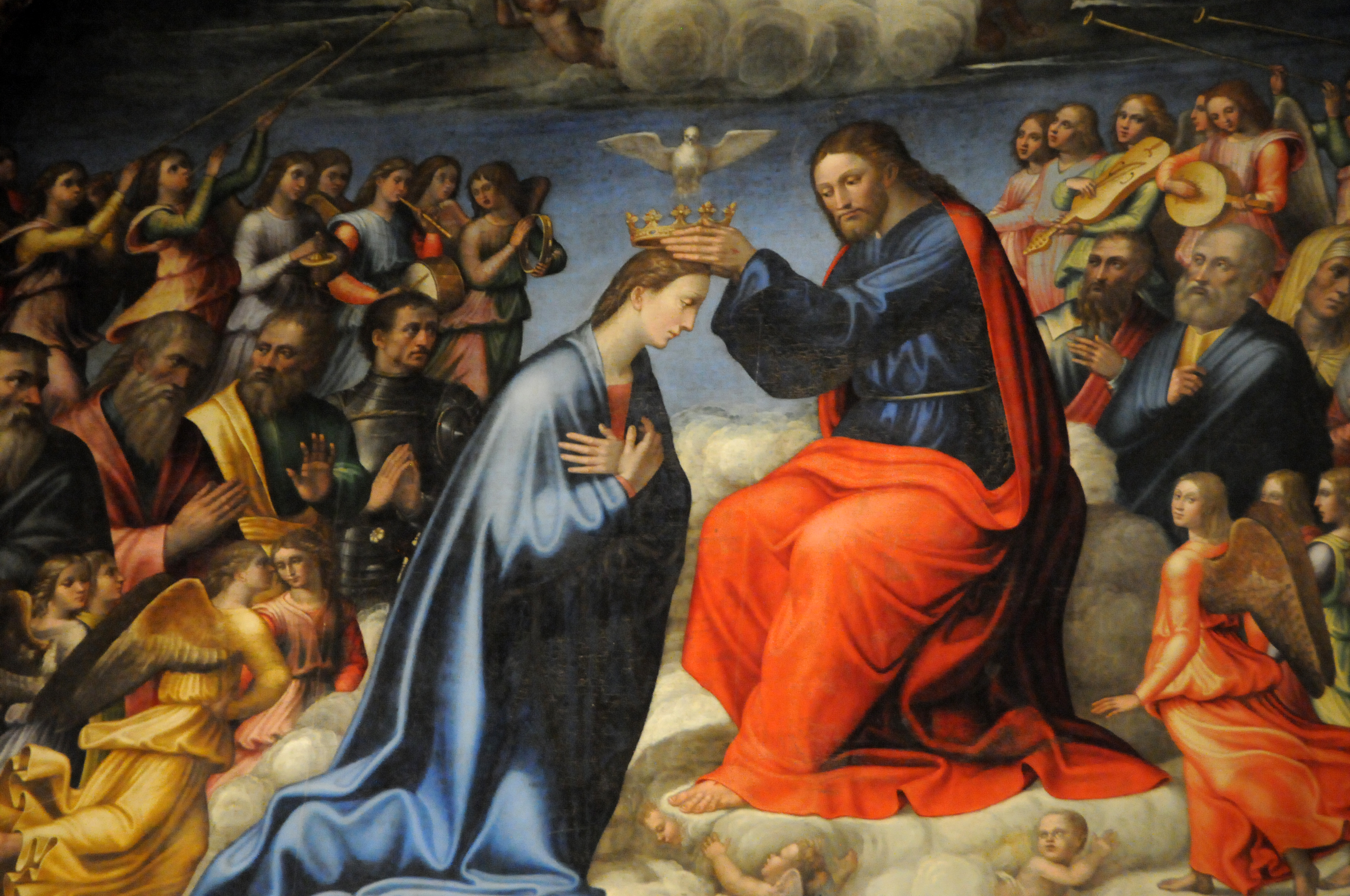
Coronation of the Virgin
