= Filippo Massaroni =

Italian bodybuilder (born 1945)

Filippo Massaroni (born July 19, 1945, in Norcia) was an Italian bodybuilder. In his career he has won the championship title amateur NABBA, Mr Universe in 1981 .

== Biography ==
After finishing his career as an athlete has become the national president of the National Amateur Bodybuilders Association.

== Achievements ==
1976

- Mr Italy, 3°

1977

- European Championships - NABBA (Medium), 4°
- European Championships - WABBA (Medium), 4°

1979

- World Championships - WABBA (Medium), 2°

1980

- Mr. Universe - NABBA (Medium), 2°

1981

- Mr. Universe - NABBA (Medium), 1°

1984

- Mr. Universe - Pro - NABBA, 2°
- Championships - NABBA (Professional), 2°
- World Championships - WABBA (Professional), 5°

1985

- Mr. Universe - Pro - NABBA, 4°

== See also ==
- AAU Mr. Universe
