= Norcia =

Nursia Norcia
- Comune
- Comune di Norcia
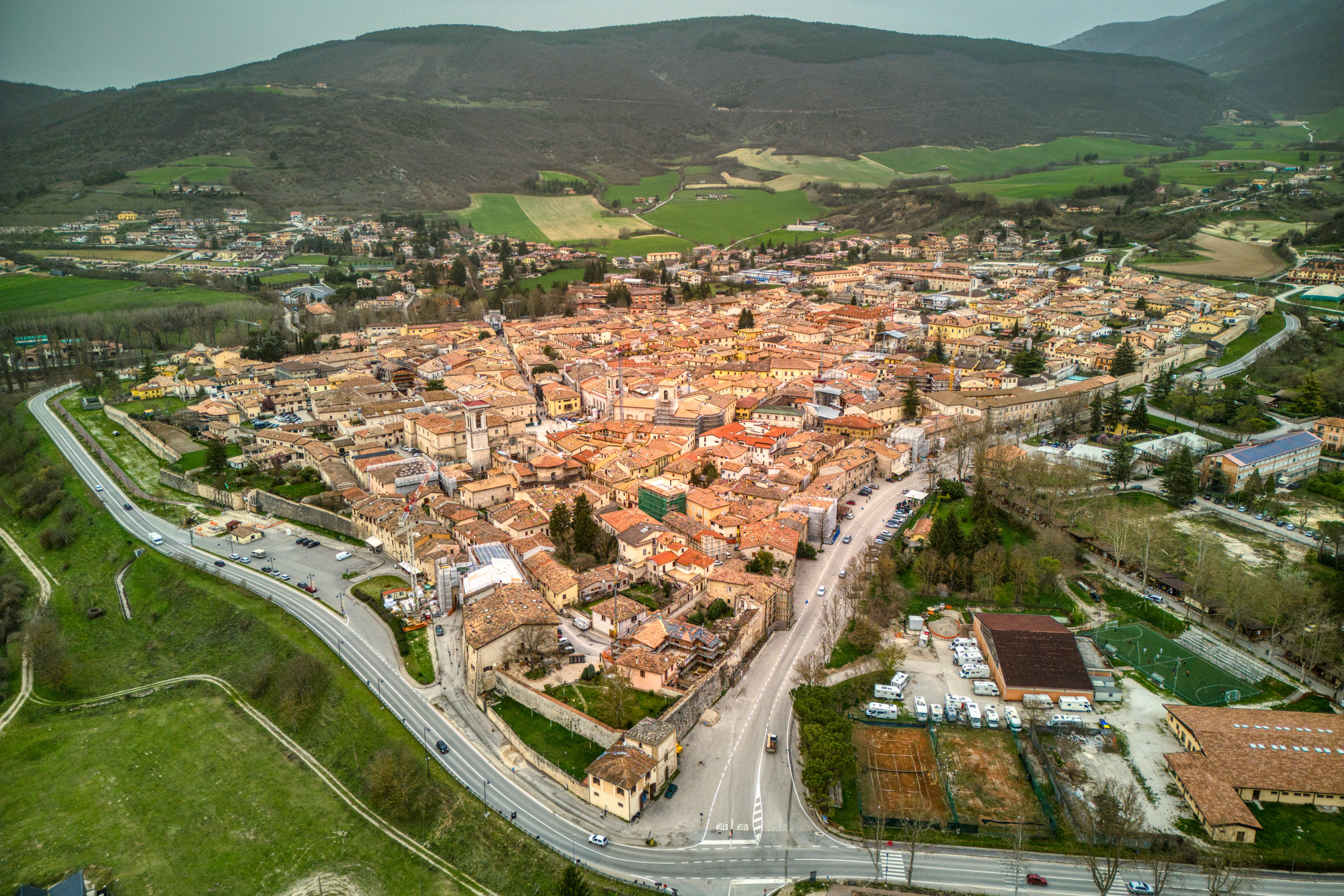
- View of Norcia

- Location within Italy Location within Umbria
- Coordinates: 42.792599°N 13.093177°E
- Country: Italy
- Region: Umbria
- Province: Perugia (PG)
- Frazioni: see list

Government
  - Mayor: Nicola Alemanno

Area
  - Total: 274 km^{2} (106 sq mi)
- Elevation: 604 m (1,982 ft)

Population (1 January 2025)
  - Total: 4,457
  - Density: 16.3/km^{2} (42.1/sq mi)
- Demonym: Nursini
- Time zone: UTC+1 (CET)
  - Summer (DST): UTC+2 (CEST)
- Postal code: 06046
- Dialing code: 0743
- Patron saint: St. Benedict
- Saint day: 21 March, 11 July
- Website: Official website

Norcia (Italian: [ˈnɔrtʃa]), traditionally known in English by its Latin name of Nursia (/ˈnɜːrsiə, ˈnɜːrʃ(i)ə/ NUR-see-ə, NUR-sh(ee-)ə), is a town and comune (municipality) in the province of Perugia in southeastern Umbria, Italy.

Unlike many ancient towns, it is located in a wide plain abutting the Monti Sibillini, a subrange of the Apennines with some of its highest peaks, near the Sordo River, a small stream that eventually flows into the Nera. The town is popularly associated with the Valnerina (the valley of the Nera). It is a member of I Borghi più belli d'Italia ("The most beautiful villages of Italy").

The area is known for its air and scenery, and is a base for mountaineering and hiking. It is also widely known for hunting, especially of the wild boar, and for sausages and ham made from wild boar and pork. In Italian, such products have been named after Norcia, and are known as norcineria.

== Etymology ==
The name Norcia has been connected with several ancient traditions. According to Adone Palmieri, it has been linked to a King Urso Nursino, while another tradition derives the name from the goddess Nortia, identified with Fortuna, who was venerated there by the Etruscans.

== History ==
=== Pre-Roman period ===
Norcia, ancient Nursia, was a city of the Sabines, although situated very close to the territory of the Umbrians, as attested by classical writers including Livy, Plutarch, Dionysius, Pliny, Silius Italicus, and Ptolemy.

In early times several Sabine settlements or pagi arose in the territory of Norcia. Their existence is attested by numerous tomb discoveries containing funerary objects of distinctly Italic type.

Particularly notable were the discoveries of a necropolis at Ancarano (a frazione of Norcia), where one such settlement stood. Traces of a temple built of roughly squared stones were found there, together with Etruscan and Campanian terracottas and remains of an ancient defensive wall composed of irregular natural stones laid without mortar. Among the most remarkable finds were bronze objects including Italic swords, shield disks worked in relief and decorated with studs and bosses, fibulae, rings, and other items dating to the 7th century BC.

Another necropolis existed near the town itself, in the plain known as Santa Scolastica.

According to the historian Giacomo Lauro, Norcia was a powerful Sabine city when the Sabine territory was divided for a long time into four prefectures: Norcia itself, Rieti, Cures, and Nomentum. Under King Songo it was regarded as the capital of Sabina. Homer and Virgil recount that many centuries before the founding of Rome the warriors of Norcia took part in the siege of Troy and later received Roman citizenship.

=== Roman era ===
In later times the town was placed within Picenum. Like the other Sabines, the inhabitants of Norcia became Roman citizens toward the end of the 5th century of Rome (mid-3rd century BC); however, they did not obtain the full rights of citizenship until after the Social War, and only later did Nursia attain the status of a municipium.

The earliest historical mention occurs during the Second Punic War in 205 BC, when Norcia was among the cities that voluntarily supplied soldiers for the army of Scipio. On that occasion only three Sabine cities were named: Norcia, Rieti, and Amiternum. Later the citizens of Norcia were punished by Octavian for providing assistance to Lucius Antonius during the Perusine War.

The city stood in a mountainous region with a very cold climate. Virgil referred to it as frigida Nursia, while Silius Italicus described it as a place "inhabited by frosts". Because it lay far from the principal Roman consular roads, it was not included in the ancient itineraries.

Ancient authors recorded that the countryside around Norcia was famous for the quality of its turnips, a product also mentioned by Martial. Numerous inscriptions discovered in the territory of Nursia indicate that the city was enrolled in the Quirina tribe and that its municipal magistrates included officials with duumviral and aedilician authority, as well as seviri augustales.

Christianity is commonly believed to have been introduced into Norcia in the 3rd century through the work of Saint Felician, bishop of Forum Flaminii near Foligno. He is said to have abolished the cult rendered by the inhabitants to the goddess Nortia, whose temple was converted into a Christian church. An episcopal see appears to have been established in Norcia only in the 5th century; it later disappeared for a long period and was restored in 1820.

=== Early Middle Ages ===
During the later Roman Empire Norcia declined, and it was subsequently devastated by the Lombards, who subjected it to the gastald of Ponte, a castle that governed a large Lombard administrative district. Paul the Deacon referred to the territory of Norcia as extensive.

Pope Gregory I, speaking of Saint Benedict, whose mother Abundantia was the daughter of Milleo and Diana, counts of Norcia, referred to him as born in the province of Nursia. Letters of Pope Gregory I also show that the Holy See possessed an estate in the area, administered by a trusted cleric of the Roman Church with the title of defender or rector.

During the Carolingian period, in 821, an important judicial assembly was held at Norcia by Count Alessandro together with Adelard and Leo, envoys of Emperor Louis I. The assembly dealt with the restitution of properties belonging to Farfa Abbey that had been usurped by Winigis, duke of Spoleto, and incorporated into the royal fisc. Present at the assembly were the duke himself, Gerardo duke of Camerino, four bishops of the Duchy, and two abbots.

When Otto I was crowned in Rome in 962 and confirmed the domains of the Roman Church, he also granted seven cities situated partly in Abruzzo and partly in Umbria, among which was Norcia.

=== High Middle Ages ===
Norcia formed as a free municipality in the 13th century. In the 14th century it grew through alliances, including with Visso, and emerged as the leading municipality of the Sibillini Mountains. In this period the town walls were built, and the area was also struck by plague.

Pope Boniface IX, by a special brief, granted to the municipality of Norcia in 1398 the castle of Mevole with full jurisdiction and the title of marquisate, together with Riofreddo and other neighboring places.

In the 15th century Norcia was a Guelph municipality. It experienced clashes with nearby castles and became involved in long-running conflicts with the papal legates of Spoleto.

Norcia fought numerous wars with neighboring cities, sometimes forming alliances against others and at other times rebelling against the popes according to the circumstances of the time. In 1447 Pope Nicholas V absolved the inhabitants of Norcia from the charge of lèse-majesté into which they had fallen after destroying the settlement of Cerreto. In 1450, during wars between Spoleto and Norcia, the same pope approved a truce between the two cities and entrusted its enforcement to Nicholas, bishop of Tivoli.

Further civil unrest occurred in the 15th century. The rebel leader Everso, count of Anguillara, supported by factions from Spoleto, Cascia, and nearby towns, attempted to attack Norcia. The city appealed to Pope Nicholas V, who ordered Everso to abandon the attack and sent the apostolic protonotary Giorgio Cesarini. Despite this, Everso attacked Norcia, but Giorgio Cesarini resisted and forced him to lift the siege and withdraw. After returning to his fief of Anguillara, Everso gathered new forces and continued incursions until Cardinal Barbo ended the conflict and compelled him to submit to the pope.

In 1484 Norcia was placed under the Papal Legation of Perugia.

=== Early Modern era ===
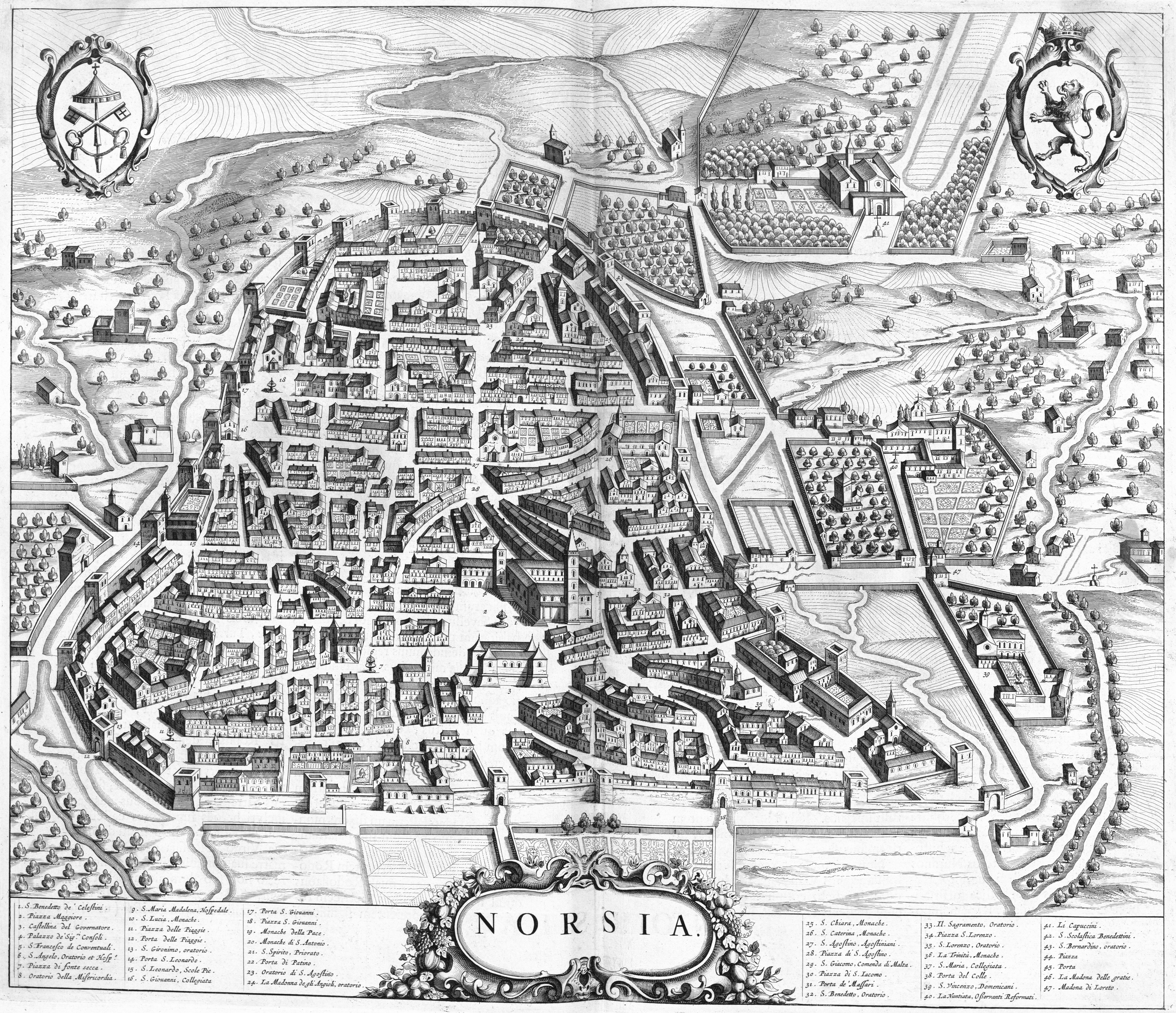
Norcia in a 17th century print by Joan Blaeu

In the 16th century a papal commissioner replaced the chief magistrate. During this period Preci rebelled and was razed. After violent unrest, the Castellina was built as the fortified residence of the papal governor, designed by Vignola. In 1569 Pope Pius V founded the Prefecture of the Mountain, which oversaw the municipalities of a wide surrounding territory.

In the early 17th century Norcia underwent a major renewal in building and the arts. The town had numerous religious institutions, including several parishes, convents, and nunneries, as well as hospitals and lay brotherhoods. Its civic and economic life was organized through craft guilds, while eight inns provided lodging. Norcia also maintained public schools and a theatre, and supported musical life and a literary academy.

On 12 May 1730 a devastating earthquake almost completely destroyed Norcia and caused the death of many inhabitants. Pope Clement XII directed extensive efforts to assist the afflicted city and provided substantial financial aid. The earthquake prompted many residents of Norcia to emigrate.

=== Contemporary period ===
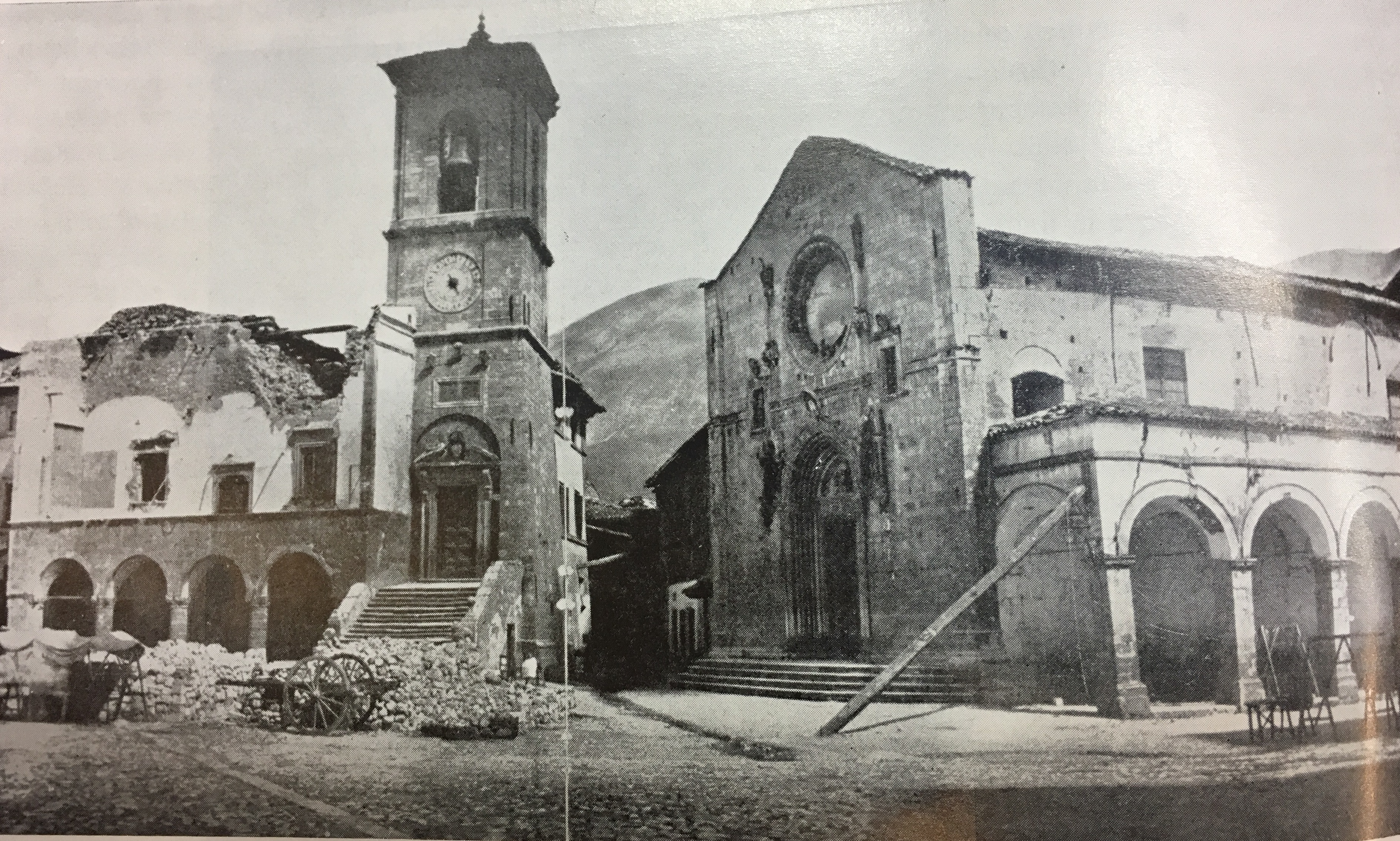
Central square of Norcia following the 1859 earthquake, photograph by Robert Turnbull Macpherson

In 1798 French Jacobins arrived, but local inhabitants, supported by pro-Austrian troops, drove them out. In 1809 Norcia became part of the French Empire. In 1820 papal rule was restored and the old bishopric was reinstated.

In 1837 the later bishop of Senigallia, Domenico Lucciardi, opened a carriage road from Spoleto to Norcia and onward to the frontier of Ascoli, known as the Provinciale Norcina, intended to connect with the Ascolana road. The work was later completed by Monsignor Tancredi Bellà.

In 1839 Monsignor Camillo Amici, minister of commerce and agriculture, discovered noble remains of monuments of the ancient city of Vespasia at a site called Vespa.

In the mid-19th century, the city of Norcia had 9,280 inhabitants. Of these, 8,380 persons lived within the built settlement and about 900 in rural houses of the surrounding countryside.

A devastating earthquake in 1859 left 676 houses ruined, with only 76 still standing. The earthquake caused enormous damage, leaving so little of the ancient structures standing that scarcely anything of old Norcia remained.

On 18 September 1860 a plebiscite ended papal power in Norcia and approved union with the Kingdom of Italy.

=== 21st century ===
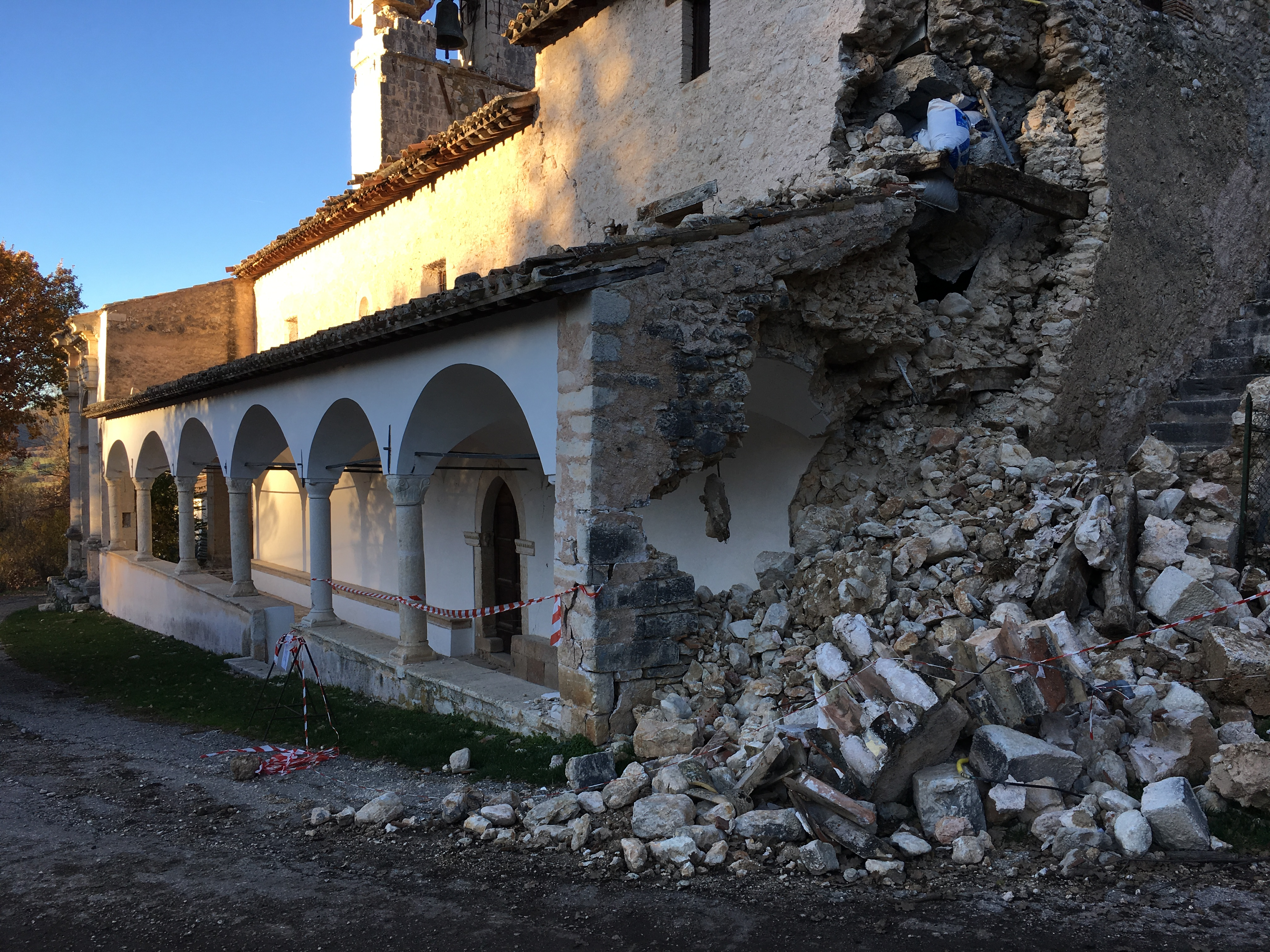
Earthquake damage to the portico of the church of the Madonna Bianca following the 2016 earthquakes

On 24 August 2016, a magnitude 6.2 earthquake and numerous strong aftershocks struck near Norcia, causing major damage to the towns in the region. The people in the town of Norcia were not injured. Though many citizens were displaced, the town itself only suffered structural damage. However, several small surrounding towns received heavy damage and many collapsed buildings.

On 30 October 2016, another magnitude 6.5 earthquake rocked Norcia, causing heavy damage to the city: among other buildings, the nave of the Basilica of St. Benedict was destroyed.

== Geography ==
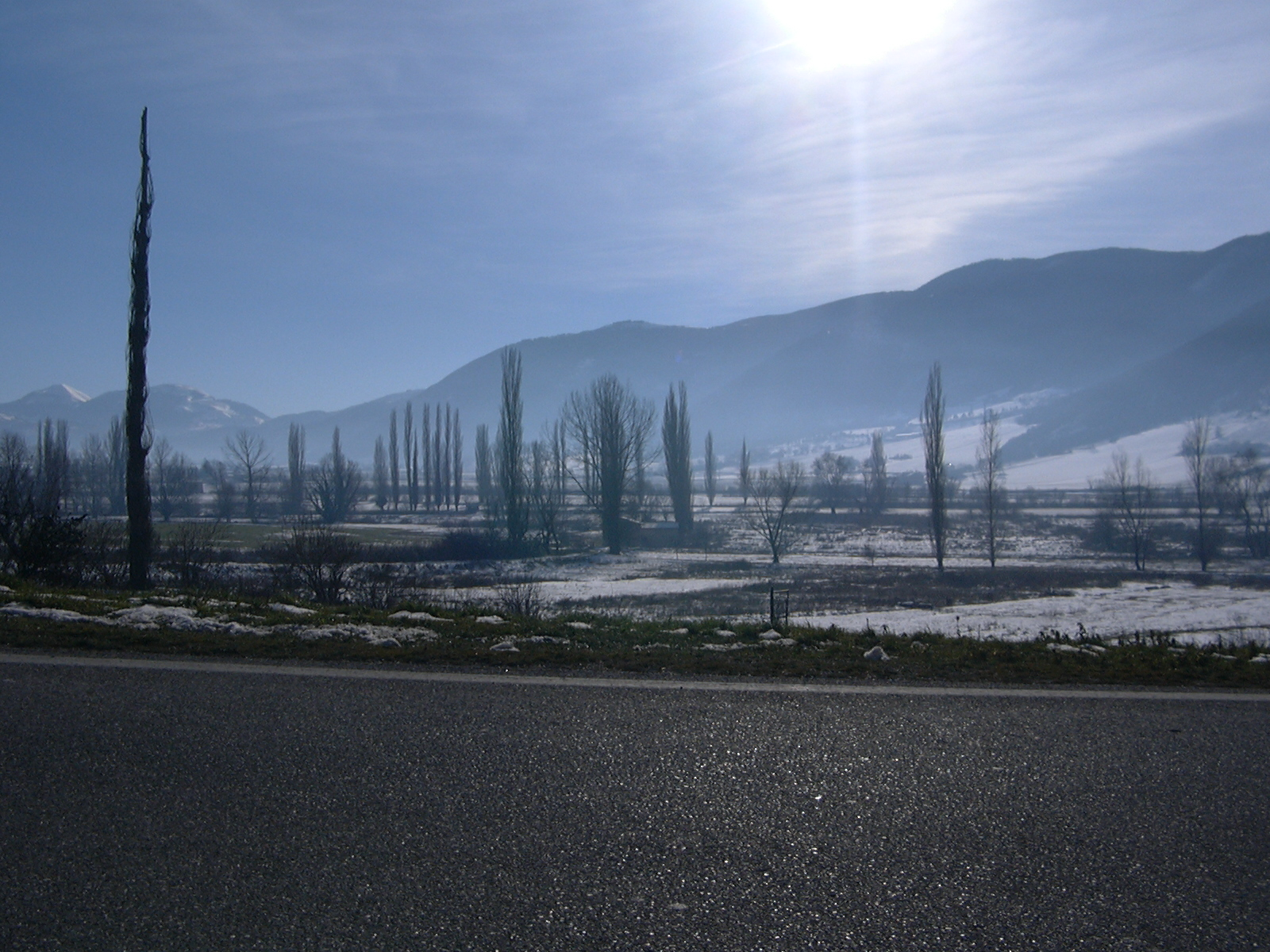
December landscape on the plain surrounding Norcia

Norcia lies in the most mountainous part of Umbria, near the central Apennine chain and close to the Sibillini Mountains. The climate is harsh, and vegetation develops late and remains limited.

The town stands at an elevation of 603 metres (1,978 ft) above sea level in the middle of a plateau, on a plain with a fairly wide horizon.

The climate is cold and subject to snow. North winds prevail in winter and west winds in summer. A river runs near the city, while the nearest stream is called Patino. Nearby woods include Opaco, Madonna di Capregna, and Patino. Many areas are covered by oak woods producing acorns.

Nearby mountains include Monte Fuscello, Monte Burbero, and Monte Tetrico. About 2 miles (3.2 km) to the north, at the summit of the Apennines at the pass of the Grotta della Sibilla, lies a small lake known as the Lago di Norcia with a circumference of about 2 miles (3.2 km). Its small emissary forms a stream that flows into the Tresdera.

=== Subdivisions ===
The municipality includes the localities of Agriano, Aliena, Campi, Capo del Colle, Casali di Serravalle, Castelluccio, Cortigno, Fontevena, Forsivo, Frascaro, Grotti, Legogne, Norcia, Nottoria, Ocricchio, Ospedaletto, Paganelli, Pescia, Pie' del Colle, Pie' la Rocca, Piediripa, Popoli, San Marco, San Pellegrino, Sant'Andrea, Sant'Angelo, Savelli, Serravalle, Valcaldara, Villa di Serravalle.

In 2021, 593 people lived in rural dispersed dwellings not assigned to any named locality. At the time, the most populous locality was Norcia proper (2,728).

Agriano, whose name derives from Agri Omnae or Omne, an ancient castle, stands on a plain in a temperate climate with a broad horizon.

Pescia, named from the nearby Pescia stream, lies in a valley with a very narrow horizon. Pescia once formed a marquisate under the lords Antici of Recanati.

Serravalle lies in a valley on the provincial road with a restricted horizon. Serravalle lies on the Sordo River a few hundred meters upstream from its confluence with the Corno.

== Economy ==
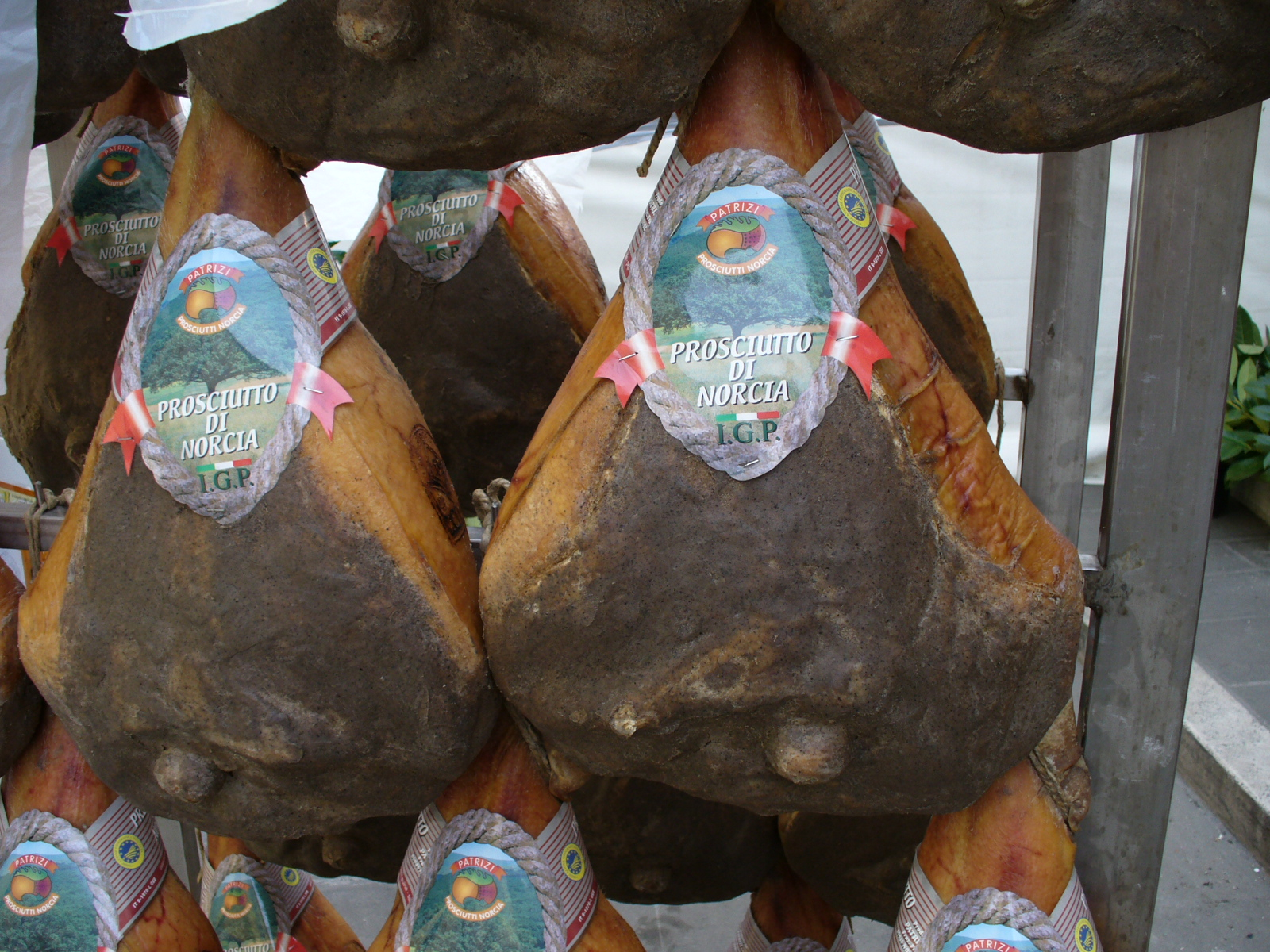
Prosciutto di Norcia ham

In the 19th century, the territory of Norcia was described as moderately fertile and well cultivated in the plain where the town stands, while the remainder was largely sterile with sparse vegetation due to cold weather and snow. Oak forests were abundant and sustained numerous herds of swine, which formed the most important industry of the inhabitants.

The population was engaged in the processing of pork not only locally but also in other places, particularly in Rome, where the term norcino came to denote anyone practicing this trade.

Among the products of the land are truffles, as well as cereals, wine, and pasturelands.

Norcia also possessed extensive wool manufactories producing cloth, leather tanneries, and factories producing linen and hemp textiles.

== Religion ==
=== Basilica of San Benedetto ===
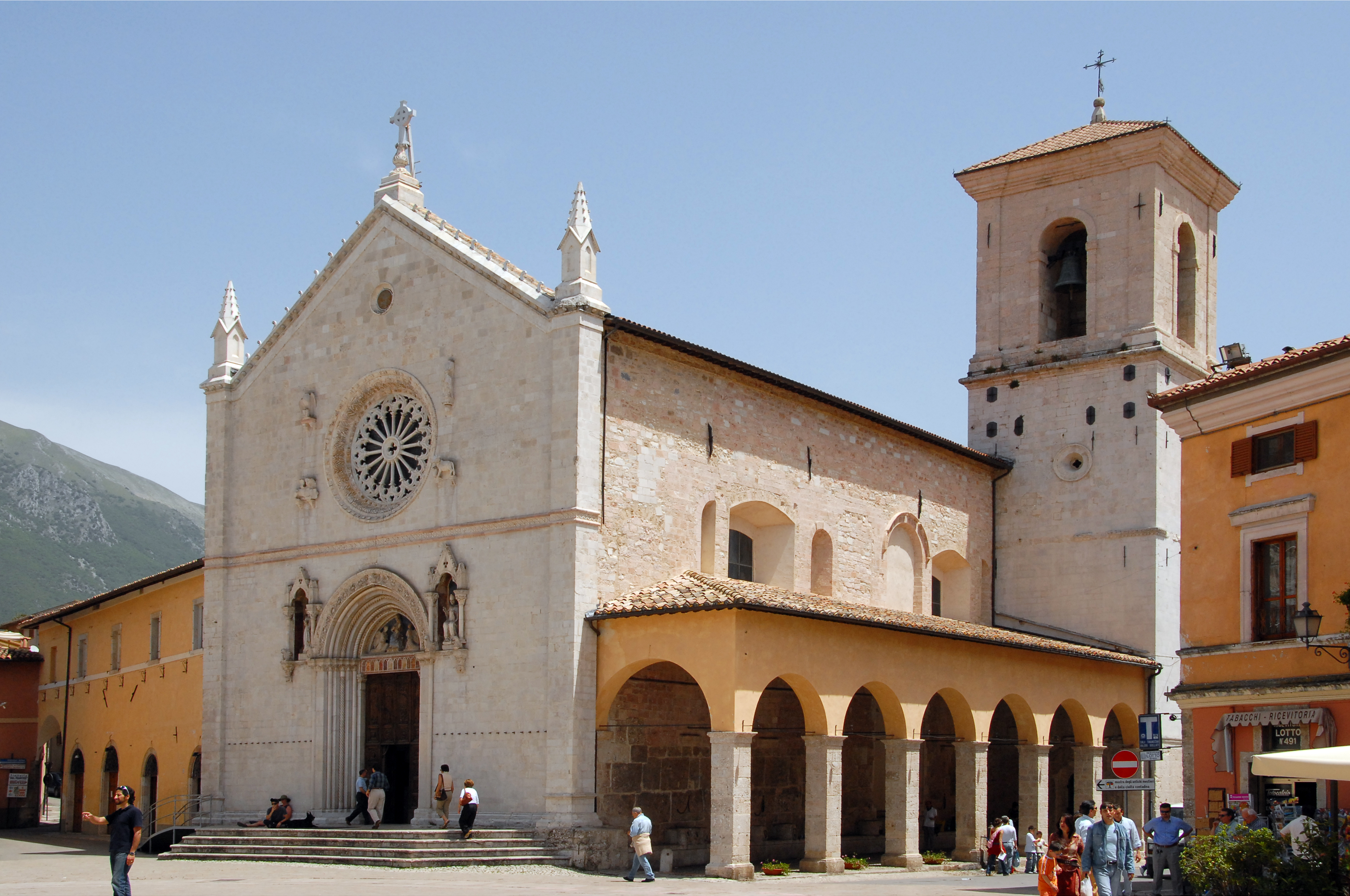
Front of the Basilica, with the arcaded portico along the right side, 2006

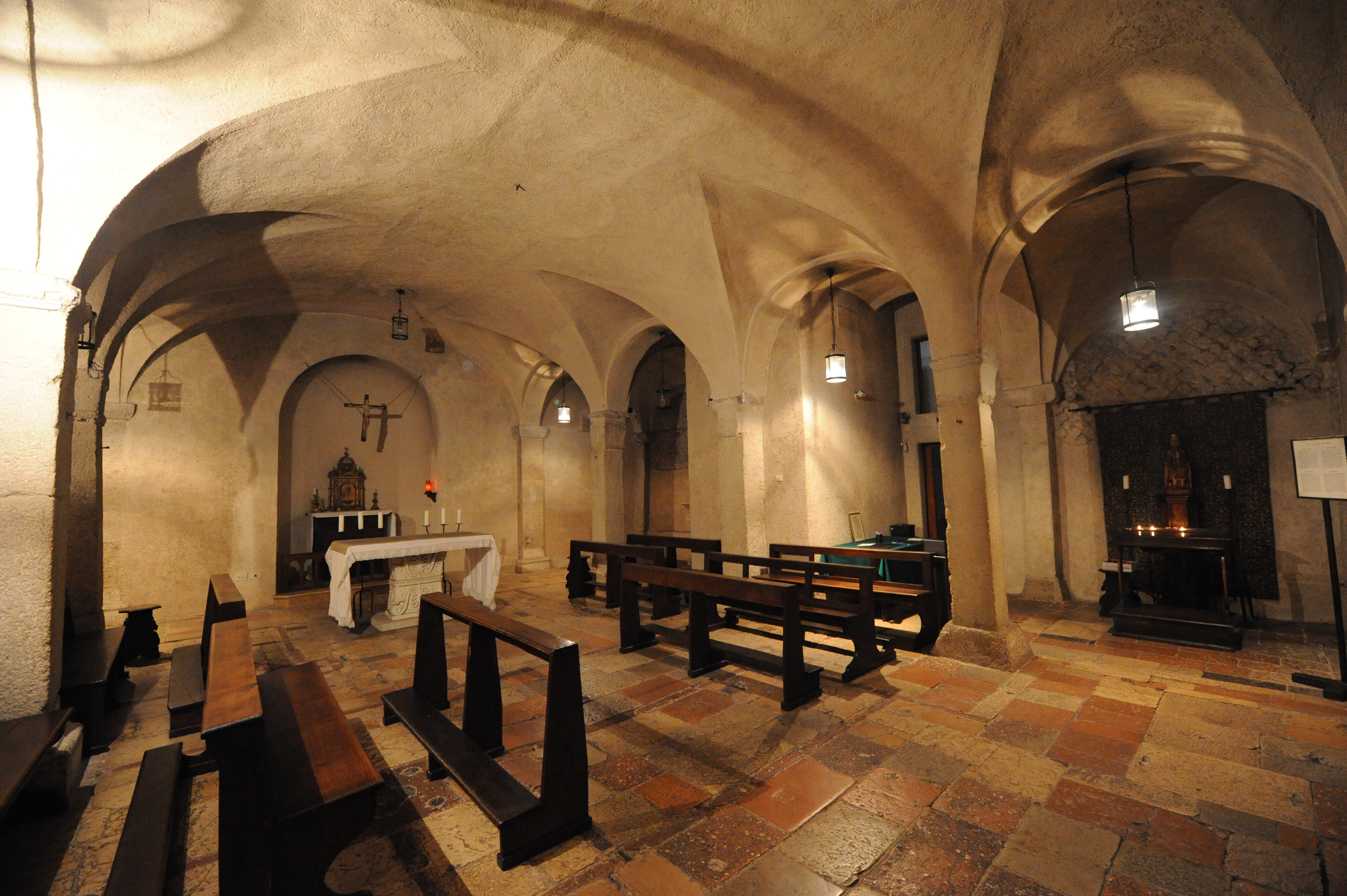
Low-columned hall with groin vaults in the Basilica (photograph taken in 2012)

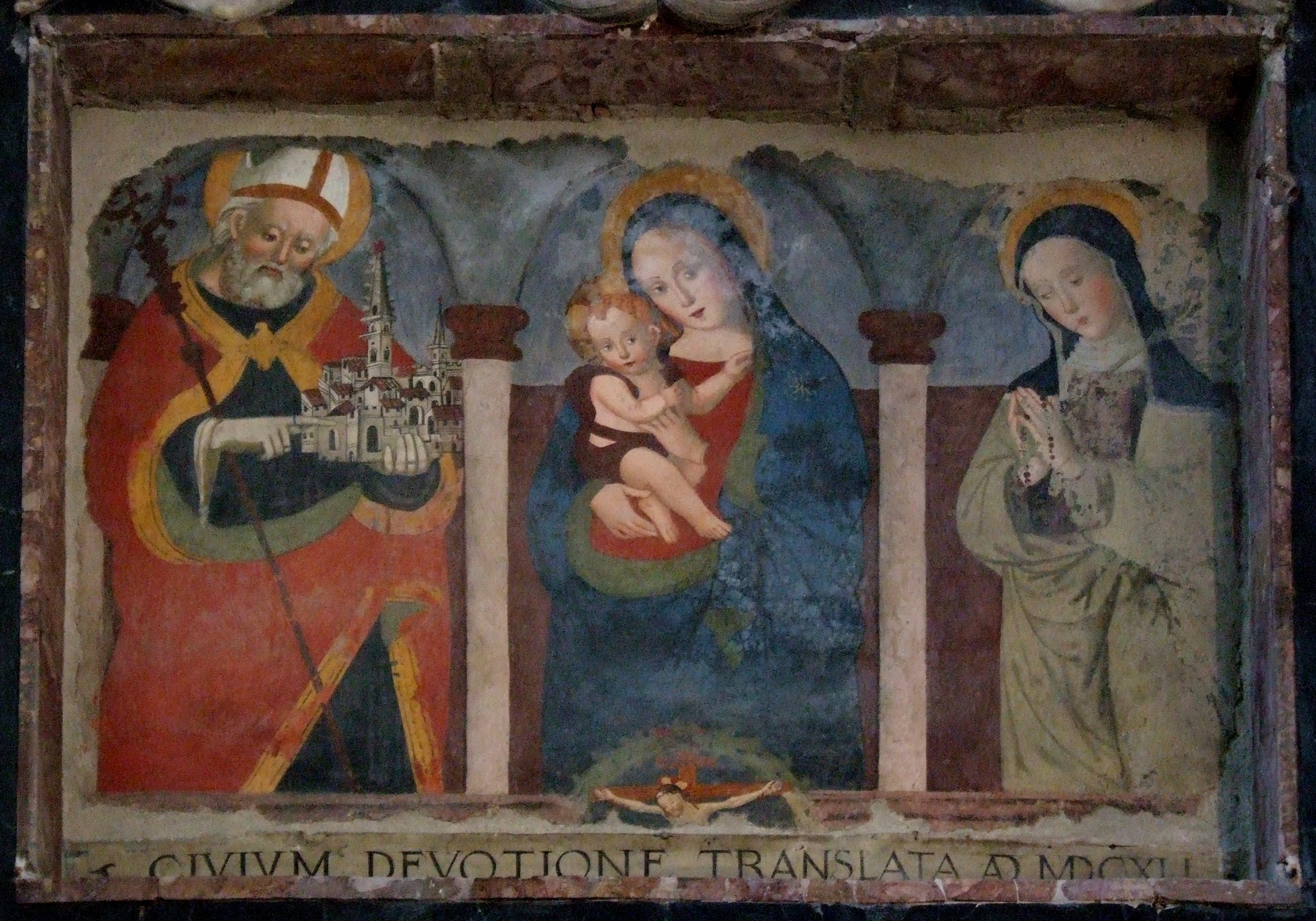
Madonna and Child between Saints Benedict and Scholastica; fresco by Giovanni Sparapane (photographed 2013)

The Basilica of San Benedetto stands on Piazza San Benedetto in the historic center of Norcia. Tradition holds that the site was the birthplace of the twin saints Benedict and Scholastica.

The basilica was built between 1290 and 1338 over a pre-existing crypt and was later enlarged by the monks of Sant'Eutizio in Valcastoriana. In the 14th century the bell tower was erected; the bell tower bears the date 1388 carved in a band. The upper part was destroyed by the earthquake of 1703 and later rebuilt on a smaller scale.

The church was rebuilt for the third time in 1787. Following the earthquake of 1859 the upper portion of the façade was restored. A portico was added to the right side of the façade in 1570 and originally served as a covered market for cereals. Restoration work carried out in the 1950s uncovered the 14th-century triumphal arch.

The façade is built in light-colored stone with a gabled form and is framed by two pilasters ending in pinnacles. It is divided by a cornice that was originally decorated with polychrome inlays. The portal is surmounted by a lunette containing a sculptural group of the Madonna and Child with two adoring angels, flanked by niches with statues of Saint Benedict and Saint Scholastica. Above is a rose window surrounded by the symbols of the four Evangelists.

On the left wall near the entrance is a fresco depicting the Coronation of the Virgin with Saint Barbara and Saint Michael the Archangel, attributed to Lo Spagna. From the center of the church one descends into the crypt, composed of three aisles and restored entirely in the 17th century. In the sacristy is a remarkable reliquary known as that of San Benedetto, sculpted in silver and decorated with engraved and enameled medallions and small statues, surmounted by a dome with pinnacles. The reliquary bears the date 1450 and is about one meter in height.

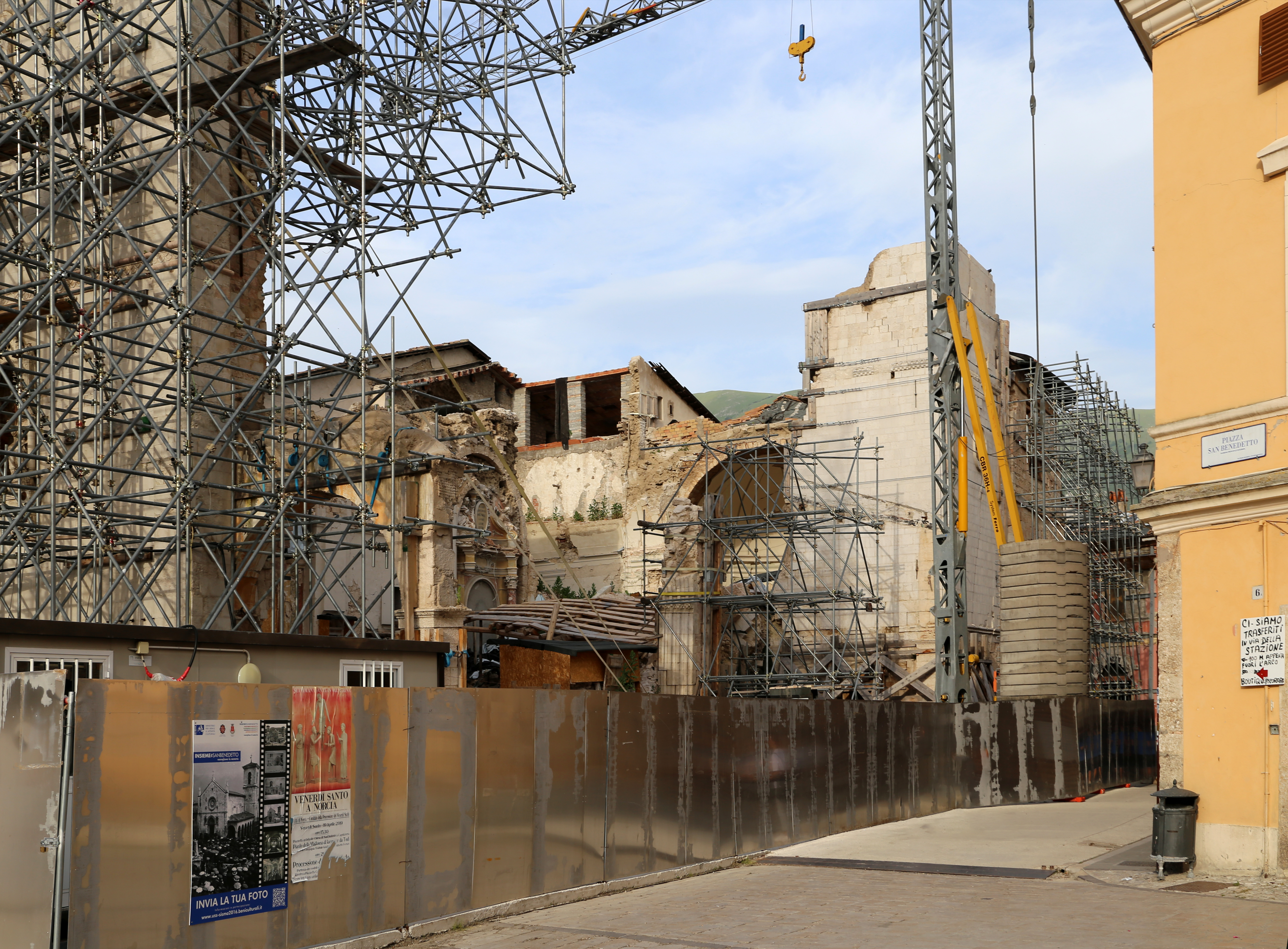
Ruins and reconstruction works of the Basilica, 2019

The interior has a Latin cross plan with a single nave and a polygonal apse, and was rebuilt in the 18th century. In the left transept arm is a large painting by Filippo Napoletano dated 1621 depicting Saint Benedict and Totila. On the altar of the right arm is a painting of the Madonna and local saints by the Roman painter Vincenzo Manetti, dating to the mid-17th century. The apse contains a 16th-century wooden choir originally from the Church of the Annunziata.

The crypt beneath the nave is divided into three aisles by pillars with capitals. The central aisle is covered by a flattened arch vault and the side aisles by groin vaults. The left aisle ends in a small apse belonging to a 1st-century Roman public building later converted into an early oratory of Saint Benedict. Parts of the masonry are in opus reticulatum, and traces of 14th-century frescoes remain. A small doorway leads to an adjacent archaeological area with the remains of additional rooms of the Roman structure.

On 30 October 2016, a 6.6 magnitude earthquake with an epicenter near Norcia destroyed the nave of the main basilica as well as the town's cathedral, with only the façade remaining. In December 2021, the basilica began to be reconstructed with the use of original materials and the integration of earthquake-resistant technology. Reconstruction was completed on 30 October 2025.

=== Santa Maria Argentea ===
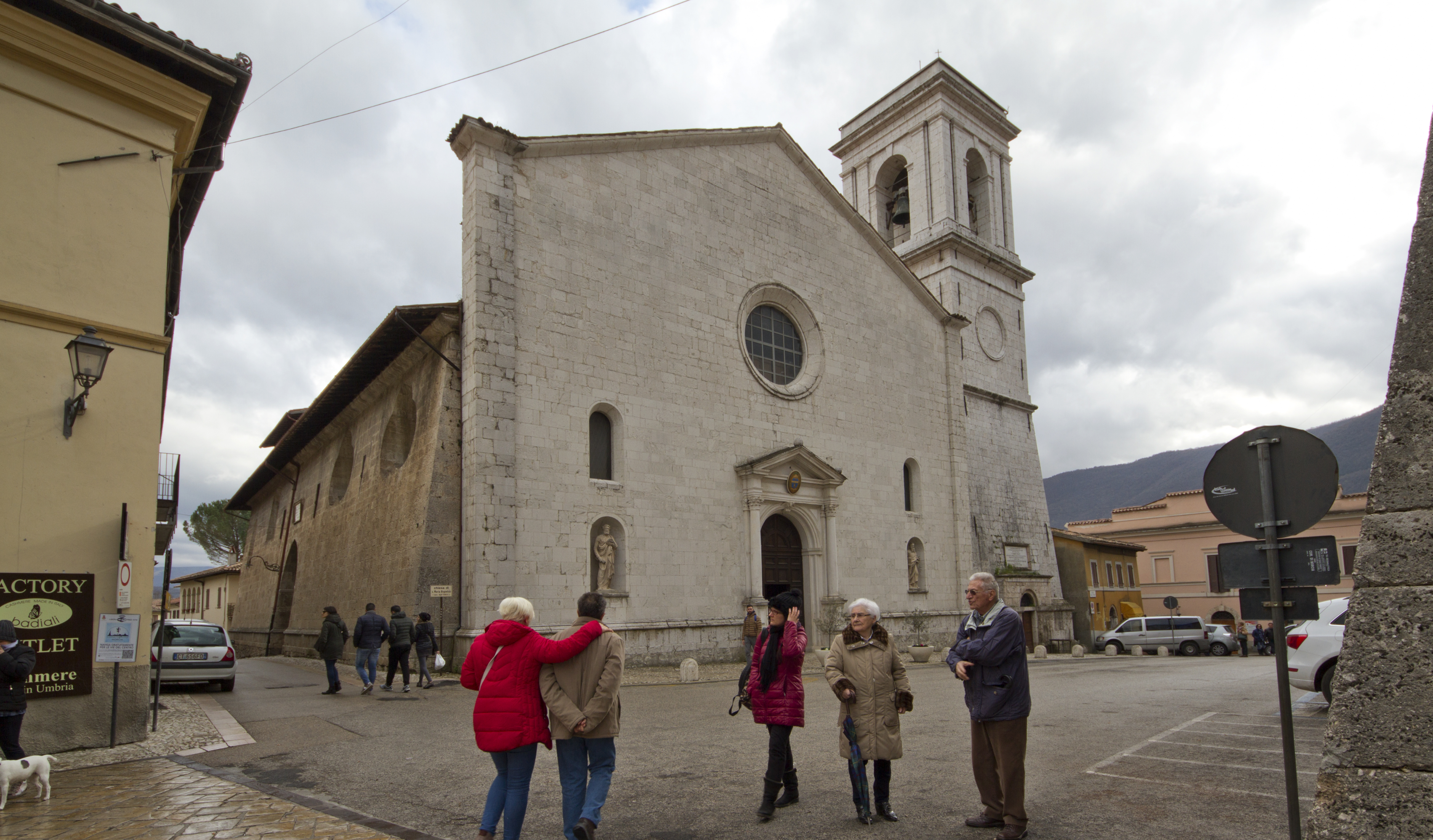
Façade and bell tower of Santa Maria Argentea seen from the piazza, March 2016

The Cathedral of Santa Maria Argentea stands on the southern side of Piazza San Benedetto. It was built after 1560, while the bell tower dates to 1869.

The interior contains several artworks, including a fresco attributed to the workshop of the Sparapane family depicting Saints Benedict and Scholastica with the Madonna and Child at the center. Another work is a crucifix by Johannes Teutonicus dated 1494 representing Christus Patiens.

=== Monastery of San Benedetto ===
A monastery of the Benedictine order stands on the site of the house where Saint Benedict was born. The underground chapel corresponds to the room in which he was born.

=== Santissima Annunziata ===
The church of the Santissima Annunziata contains on the left wall near the high altar a stone funerary monument, above which is a fresco showing Mary with Jesus and two saints, a work of the school of Lo Spagna. The tempera panel on the high altar represents the Coronation of Mary, and in the predella the Annunciation, Saint Francis, the Pietà, and Saint Jerome in the desert. This work was painted by Jacopo Siculo in 1511. On the right wall at the first altar is an oil painting showing Mary with the Child together with Saint Francis, Saint Elizabeth, Saint Bonaventure, Saint Anthony, Saint Louis, and Saint Louis the King, with the Annunciation in the predella. The vivid coloration of this painting suggests the work of a pupil of Perugino.

=== Sant'Agostino ===
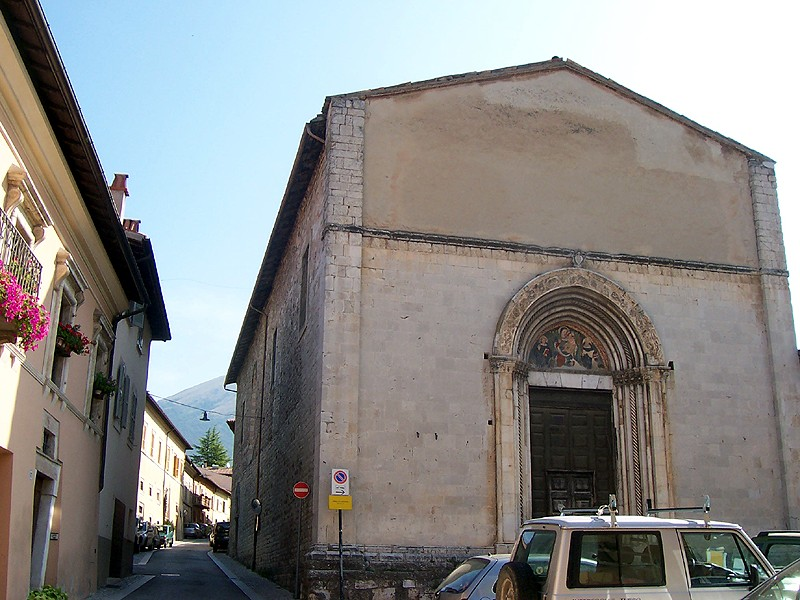
Façade of the church of Sant'Agostino, 2009

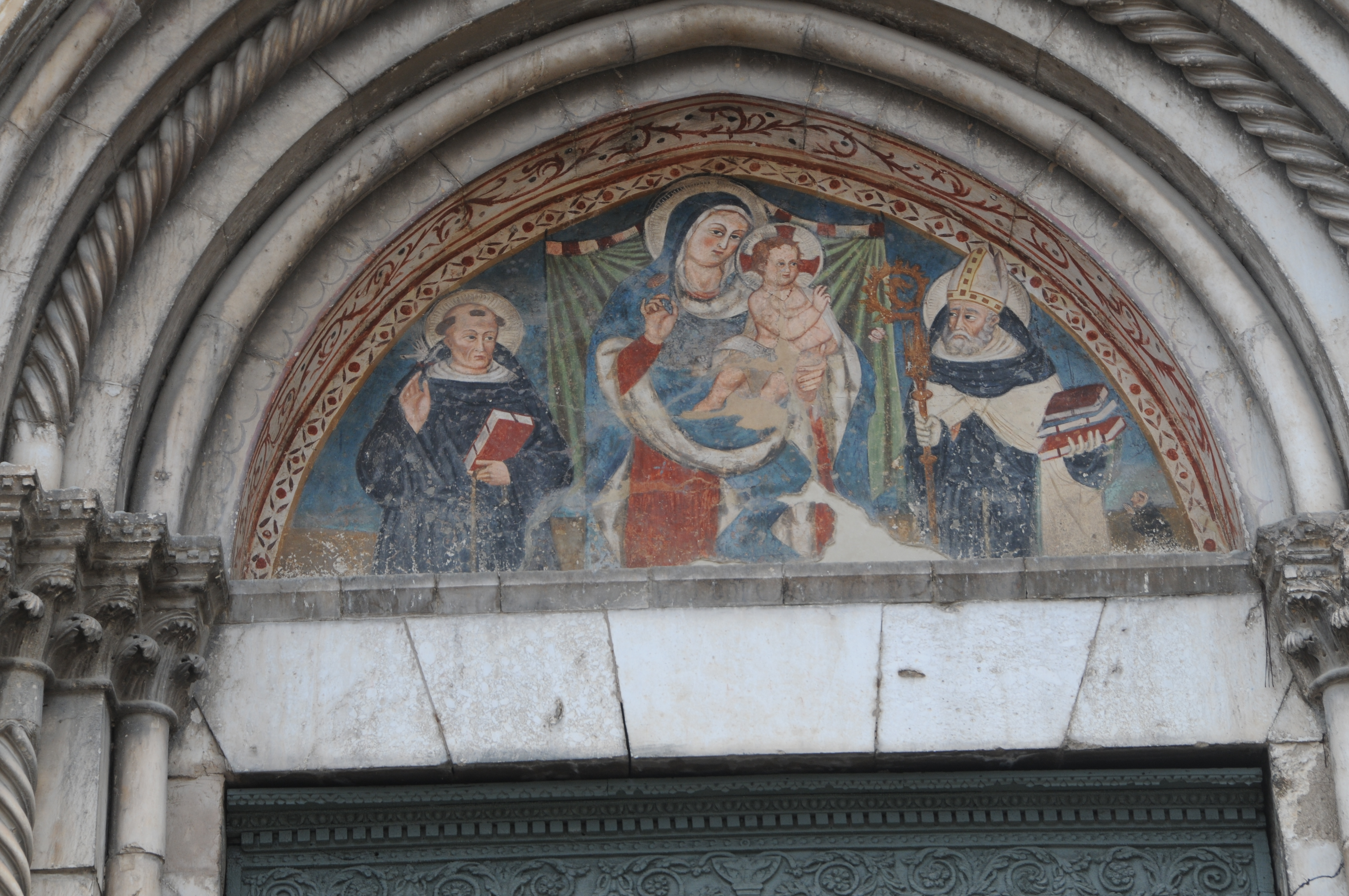
Frescoed lunette with the Madonna and Child flanked by saints above the Gothic portal of Sant'Agostino, 2015

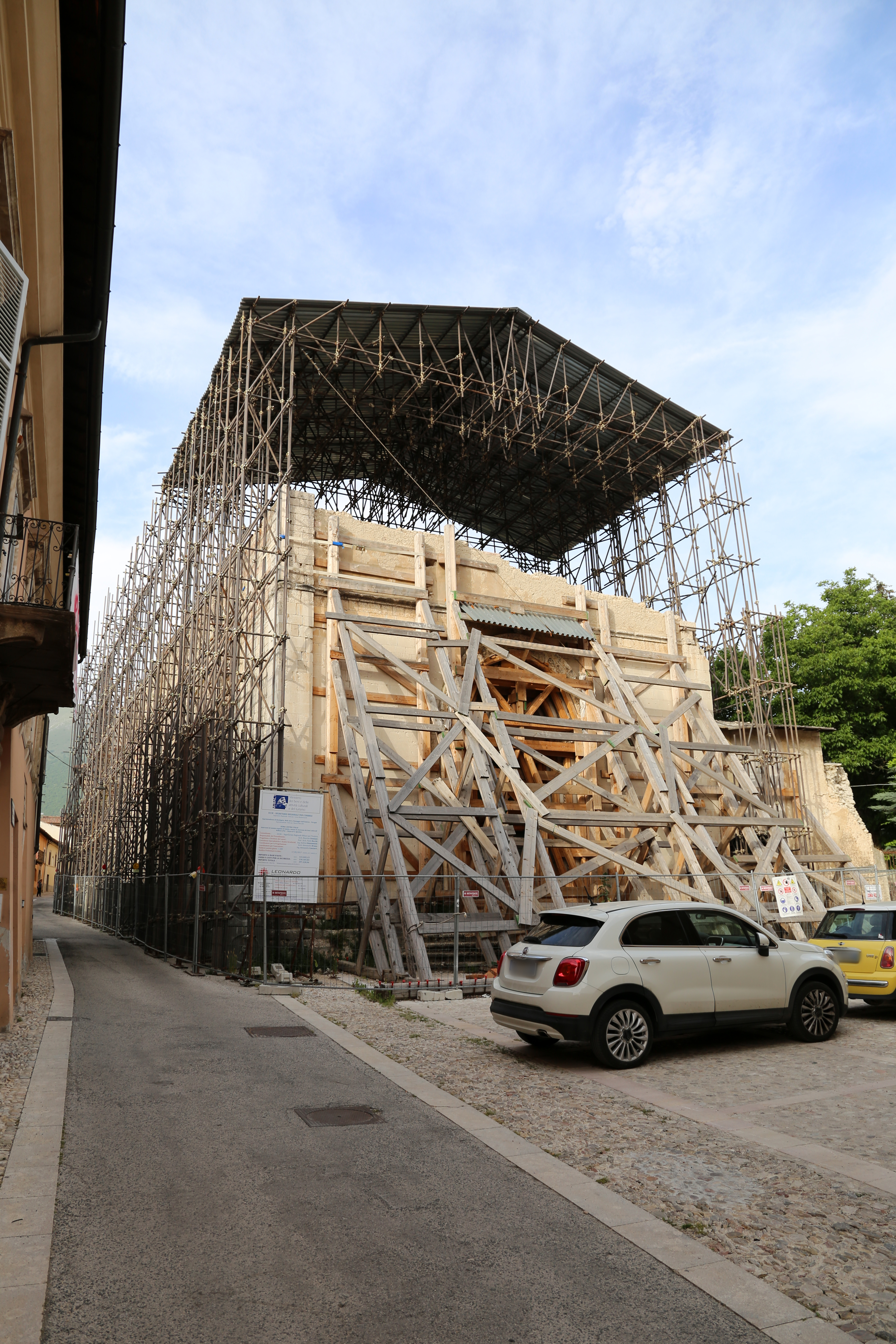
Scaffolding protecting the remains of Sant'Agostino, 2019

The church of Sant'Agostino dates in its construction to the 14th century. The entrance portal is adorned with fine sculpture. At the first altar on the left wall a portion of a fresco was discovered showing Saint Roch, Saint Barbara, and Saint Sebastian, attributed to Jacopo Siciliano.

In a nearby niche is another fresco representing the Coronation of Mary, with the Virgin seated and Saints Anthony and Claude at the sides, painted by Jovannes Batista de Jovannes Norsini in 1497. Another niche on the right contains a fresco depicting God blessing between two angels; below appears the Virgin seated on a throne with the Child, Saint John the Baptist, and Saint Anthony Abbot, with a landscape in the background. This work was executed in 1502 by Giovanni Spagna.

=== Other religious buildings ===
The church of San Giovanni has a carved wooden ceiling from the 17th century. On the entrance wall to the left is a fresco dated 1520 depicting the Virgin with the Child, Saint Benedict, and Saint Scholastica, executed by an Umbrian school.

The church of the Crocifisso contains at the high altar a large stone niche supported in front by columns. Above the entablature rise four niches containing frescoes of four apostles, works of the 14th century. On the altar stands a crucifix dating from the 15th century.

=== Churches in outlying villages ===
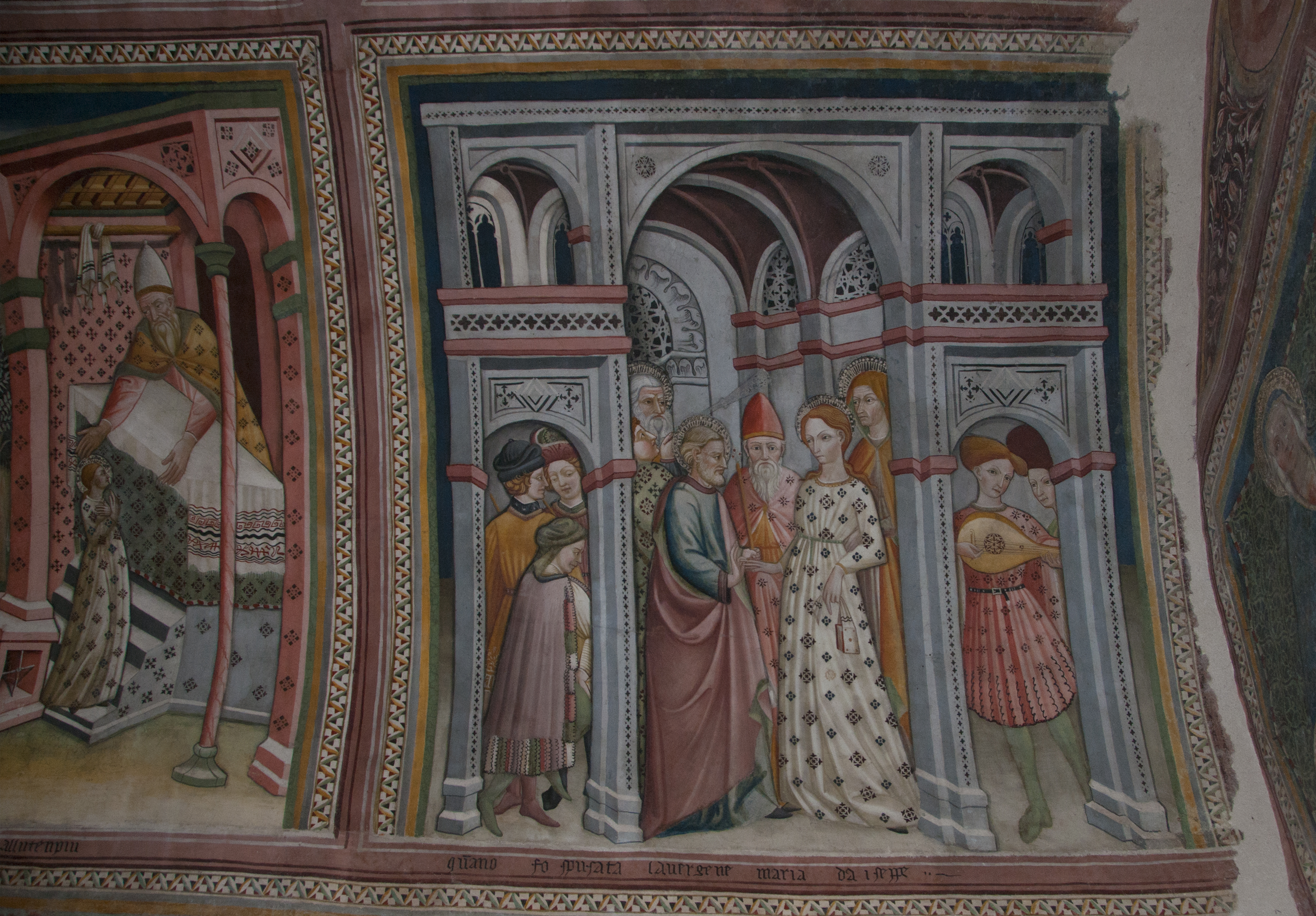
Fresco of the Marriage of the Virgin in Santa Maria Piazza at Campi

In Agriano stand the former collegiate church of San Vito, where the popular festival of Saint Vitus takes place on 15 June, and the church of San Niccolò, built according to a 16th-century design.

In Campi are the church of Sant'Andrea, associated with the local festival of Saint Andrew the Apostle celebrated in November, the church of San Salvatore, which contains Gothic stone work and paintings, and the church of Santa Maria, which contains notable paintings and frescoes on the vault.

In Pescia are located the church of Sant'Ansovino, where a popular festival in honor of Saint Ansovinus is celebrated on 13 March, the church of San Carlo Borromeo, and the church of Santa Maria Maddalena.

In San Pellegrino is the convent of Santa Maria di Montesanto (14th century), now in poor condition. It has a noteworthy cloister and a church with 17th-century canvasses and a 14th-century wooden statue, Madonna with Child.

The frazione of Savelli has the ruins of Madonna della Neve, an elegant octagonal church designed by Bramante in the 15th century. It was destroyed by the 1979 earthquake.

In Serravalle are the church of San Claudio and the parish church of San Pietro Apostolo, which honors Saint Peter the Apostle as patron of the village, whose festival is celebrated on 29 June.

== Culture ==
=== Palazzo Comunale ===
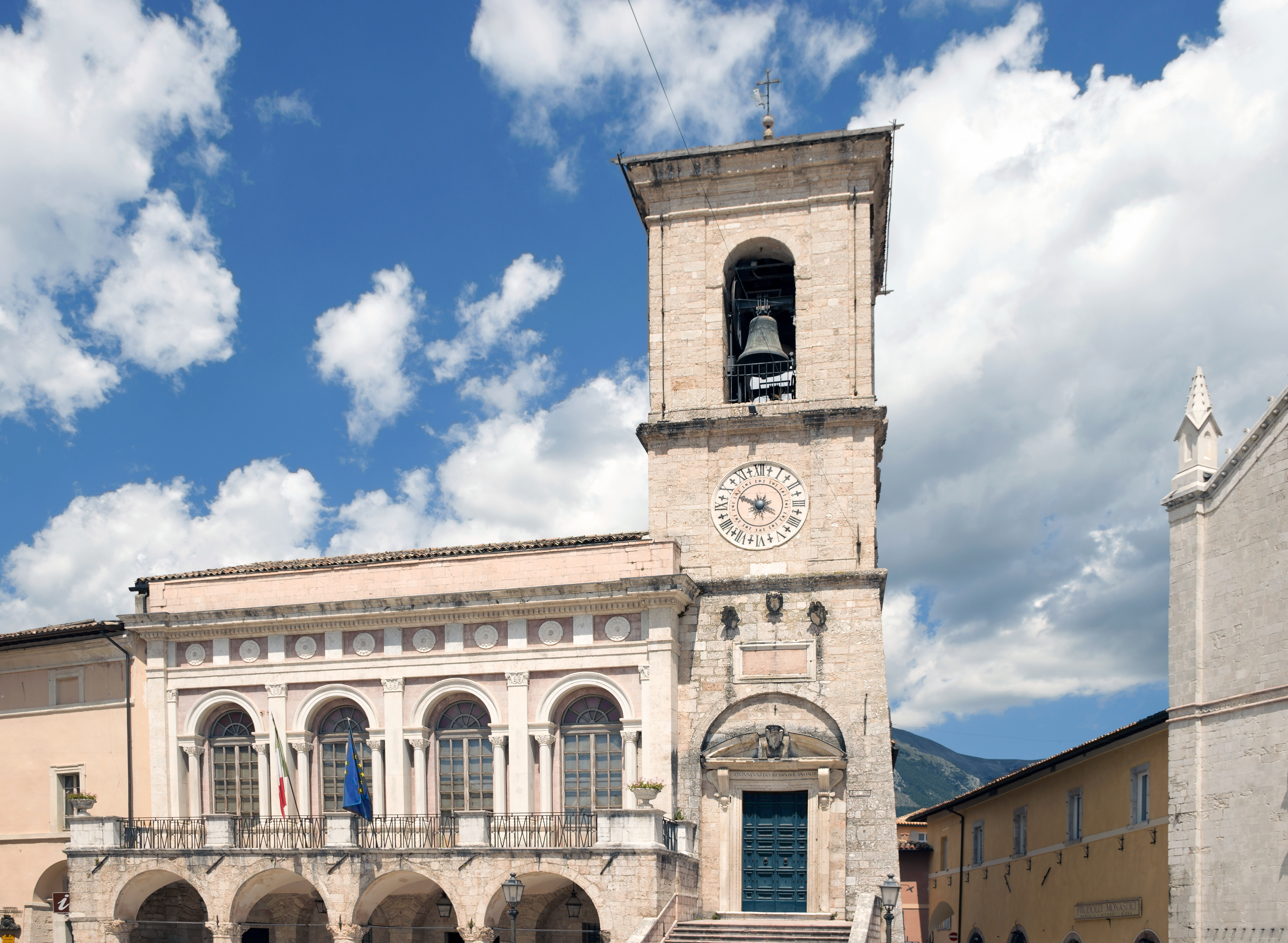
Façade and clock tower of the Palazzo Comunale in the main square, 2015

The Palazzo Comunale occupies the north-eastern side of Piazza San Benedetto. Its façade consists of a portico at ground level and a loggia above it. The portico dates to the medieval period, while the loggia was rebuilt in 1876 after the earthquake of 1859 according to a design by Domenico Mollaioli, who also carved the two lions placed at the base of the staircase. The bell tower on the right side was rebuilt after the earthquake of 1703.

Inside the council chamber are wooden stalls of the Prior and the Consuls dating to the 16th century. The Chapel of the Priors contains a reliquary of Saint Benedict dated 1450 in gilded silver with Gothic–Renaissance forms.

The Palazzo Comunale shows, through a small portico on the west side, that its construction dates back to the 13th century, though it was completely modernized in the 16th century. On the north wall of the upper loggia is a fresco of the Perugian school representing the Virgin enthroned with the Child and two angels crowning her above, with Saint Benedict, Saint Scholastica, and three other Umbrian saints beside the throne.

=== Museum La Castellina ===
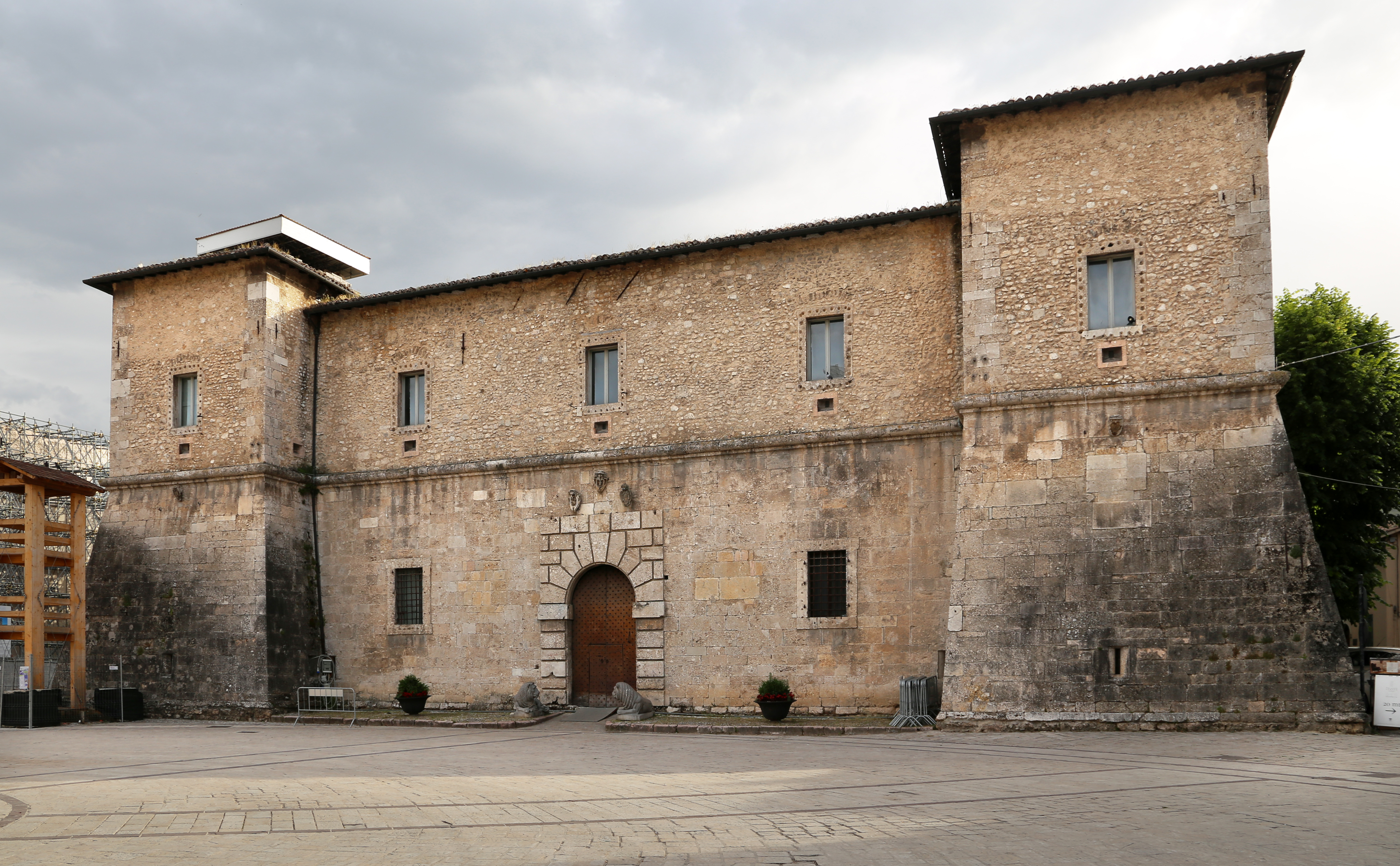
The 16th-century fortress known as the Castellina, 2019

The Rocca della Castellina was built under the pontificate of Pope Julius III to bring Norcia under subjection. A document from the municipal archive records that on 28 August 1554 the architect Giacomo Barozzi da Vignola laid out the site of the new fortress he had designed, which was completed the following year, as indicated by an inscription placed on the bastion to the northeast.

The plan forms a square with four towers on the sides. Two entrances open in the eastern and western curtain walls facing each other, and inside is a courtyard with double‑order arcaded porticoes. Only the ground floor and first floor remain today, the upper parts having collapsed in the earthquake of 1730.

The building was constructed as a fortified residence for apostolic governors responsible for controlling the surrounding territories of the Papal State. When the Prefecture of the Mountain was established in 1569, the building became its seat. After restoration in the 18th century following repeated earthquakes, it served as the municipal offices from 1860 and became a museum in 1967.

The museum preserves works of local origin dating from the 12th to the 18th centuries, including sacred furnishings, frescoes, panel and canvas paintings, polychrome wooden and stone sculptures, and glazed terracottas. Among the works are a 13th-century wooden cross by Petrus Pictor from the hamlet of Campi and a large altarpiece by Antonio da Faenza depicting the Madonna and Child with Franciscan saints dated 1519. Stone sculptures of the Madonna and Child with Saints John the Baptist and John the Evangelist by Giovanni Dalmata date to 1469. A glazed terracotta group of the Annunciation is attributed to Luca della Robbia.

The museum also houses the Massenzi collection, donated in 2002, composed largely of bronze objects and Etruscan and Greek vases dating from the 9th century to the Roman period, as well as a polychrome terracotta statue attributed to Jacopo della Quercia. Since 2003 the building has also hosted the permanent archaeological exhibition Partire per l'aldilà, displaying grave goods discovered in Hellenistic necropolises dated between the late 4th and the 1st century BC.

=== Complex of San Francesco ===
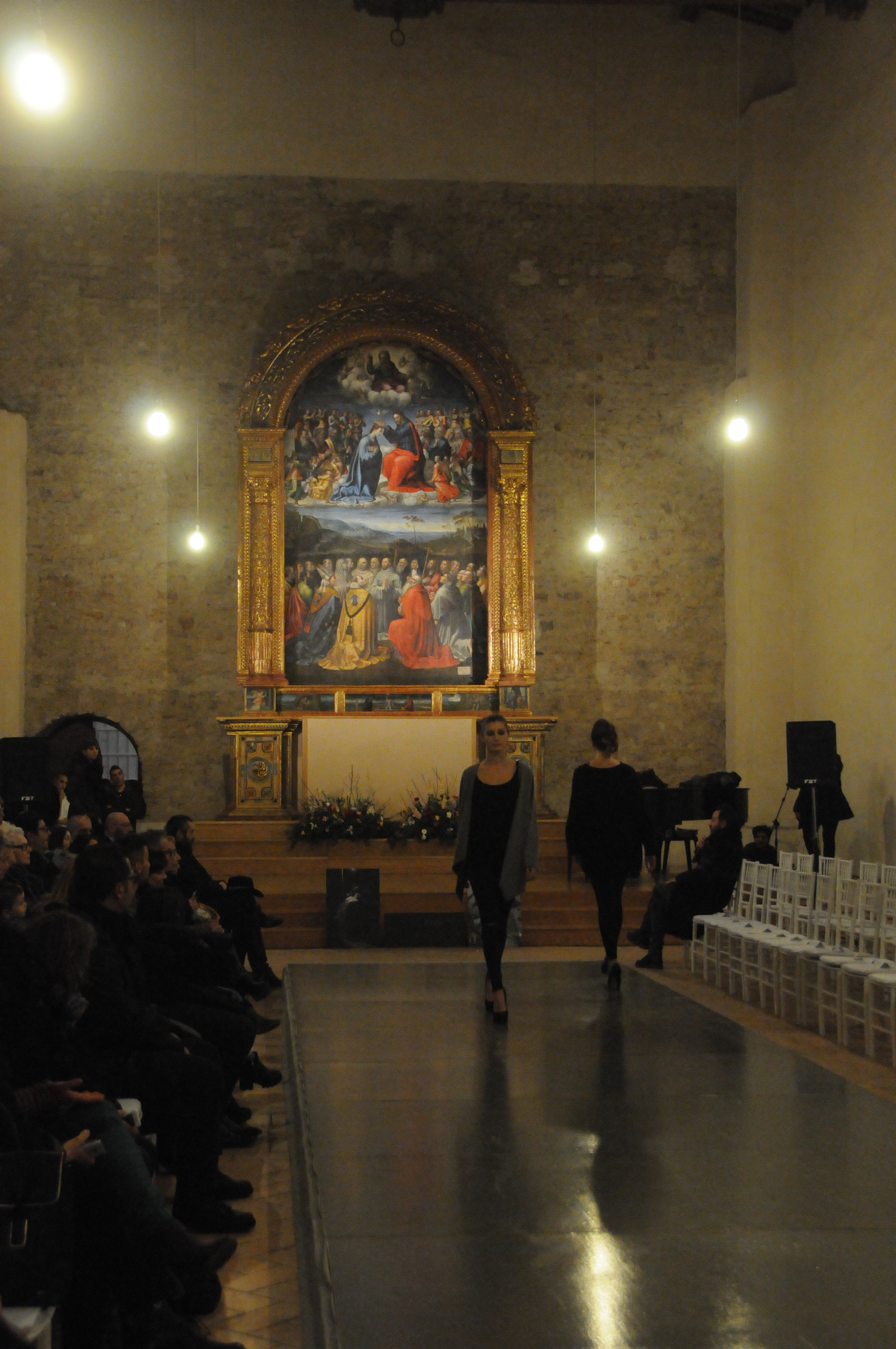
Interior of the former church of San Francesco, with the Coronation of the Virgin above the high altar

The Complex of San Francesco dates to the 14th century and today houses an auditorium, the municipal library and the historical archive. The present façade derives from reconstruction carried out by the Conventual Franciscans in the style of late Gothic architecture. The exterior includes a rose window and portals on the side façade.

The interior has a single nave and preserves a small number of surviving frescoes. The auditorium has been intended to house the altarpiece Coronation of the Virgin, painted by Jacopo Siculo in 1541 for the Franciscans of the Church of the Annunziata.

The municipal historical archive of Norcia is also located within the complex. It preserves documentation relating to the city and surrounding territory from the 13th century to the 1960s. The municipal repository also preserves state archival collections including the mandamental notarial archive.

The façade still preserves the entrance and a circular window richly ornamented. In a hall near the church are kept a wooden crucifix of the 15th century and a tempera panel showing Saint Francis with the principal virtues of the saint above and representations of Avarice and Lust below, a work of the 16th century.

=== Tempietto ===
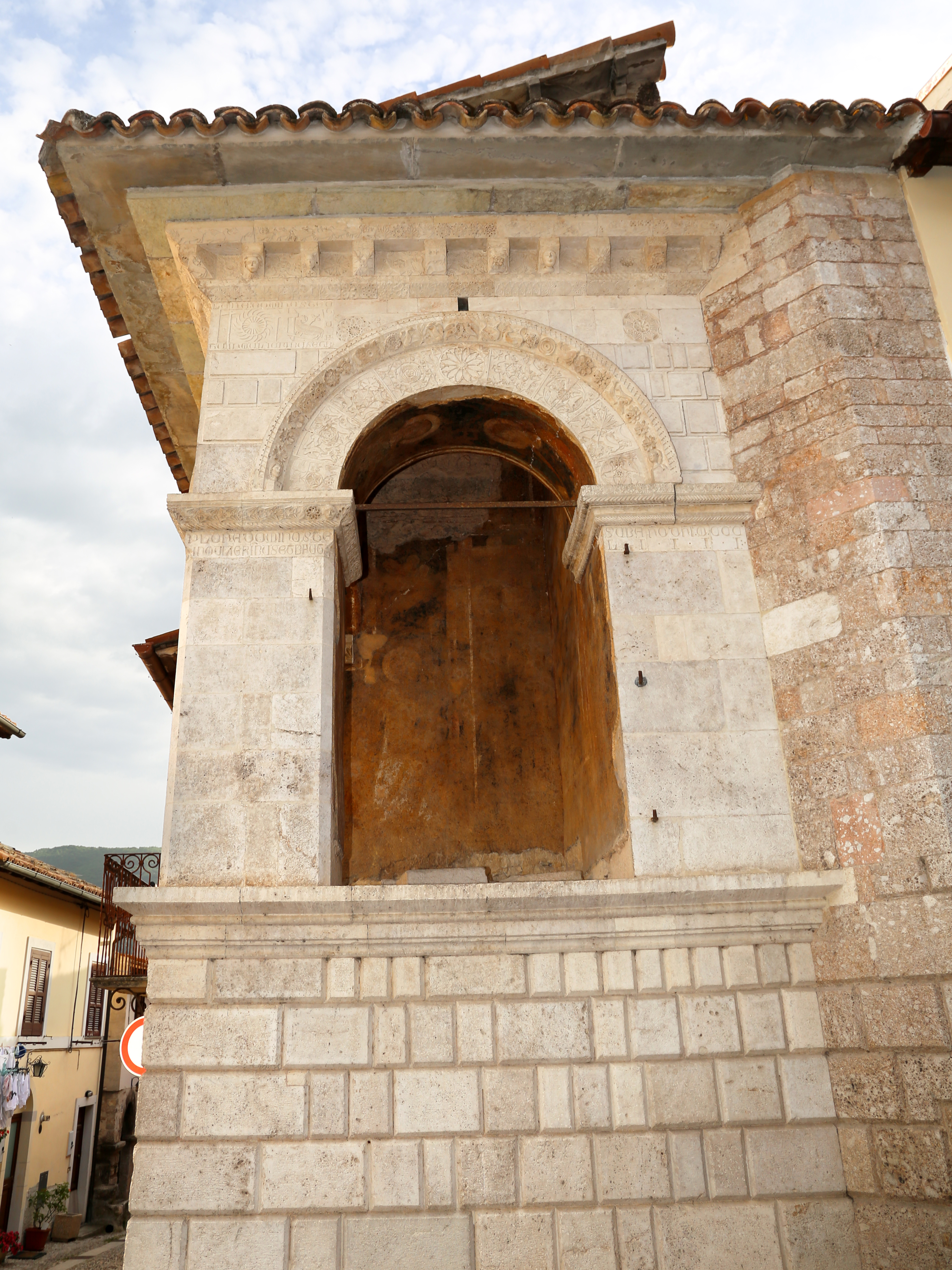
Exterior view of the shrine

The Tempietto is a small stone structure decorated in 1354 by Vanni della Tuccia, who ornamented the square-plan building with bas-reliefs including zoomorphic, anthropomorphic, geometric, symbolic and esoteric motifs. The exterior decoration concludes with rusticated stonework. An inscription running around the building records the name of the author and the date of construction.

Inside is a 14th-century fresco depicting the Madonna and Child with saints. The painting appears darkened by smoke from oil lamps whose original hooks remain visible. The windows were originally closed with wrought-iron grilles. The building was historically known as la màina, meaning "the image".

The architectural edicule has a rusticated base above which rise three pilasters supporting semicircular arches. A cornice completes the upper part, and animals playing and fighting are carved in the reversed molding. Four prayers to the Virgin are inscribed together with the name of the architect: Hoc opus feci Vannes Tutic cui animae benedicant. Castel di Tuzia, the birthplace of the craftsman, lies in the municipality of Preci.

=== Roman cryptoporticus ===
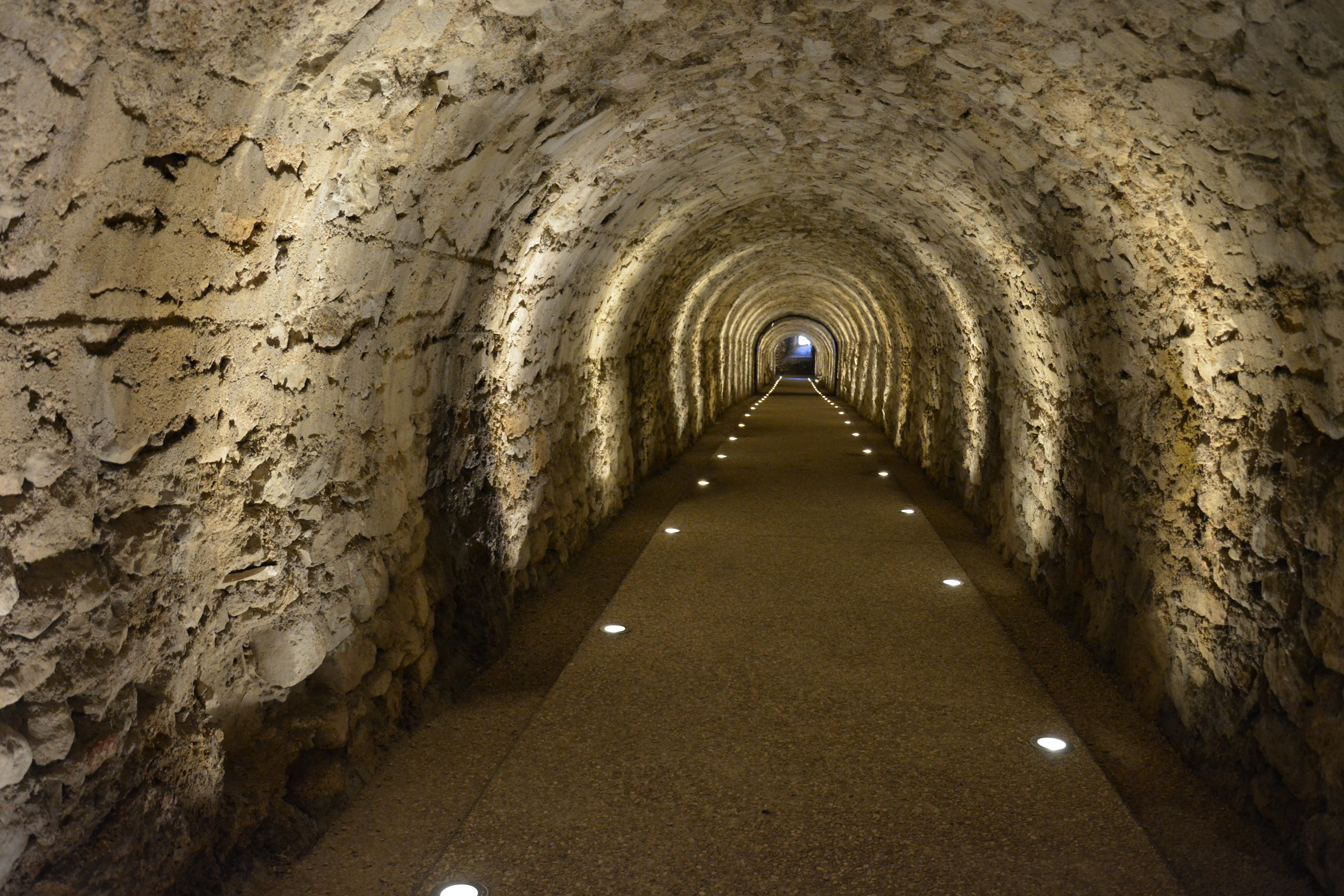
Roman cryptoporticus

The structure, likely part of the forum square of the ancient city, has two sections: an upper portico above ground and a lower cryptoporticus fully underground. They were once connected by a staircase.

Built in opus incertum and covered by a barrel vault, the lower level receives light and air from small openings set between the columns of the portico above. The portico has a single aisle, with an inner facade of Doric columns made of brick. The floor is made of thick cocciopesto. The entablature was wooden and decorated with terracotta slabs, and the roof had two slopes. Excavation dates the building to the second half of the 1st century BC.

Part of the structure next to the portico is now used as an antiquarium. It displays grave goods from tombs and hut remains found in the Campo Boario area. The exhibits also outline the geological setting and the archaeological and historical development of Norcia before and during the Roman period.

=== Other cultural aspects ===
A tradition holds that a Sibyl from Norcia, called the Nursina Sibyl, gave her name to Monte Sibilla.

The city's walls extend about 1.5 miles (2.4 km), enclosing streets and a spacious main square.

At the site called Vespa, remains of monuments belonging to the ancient city of Vespasia were discovered in 1839.

After the earthquake of 22 August 1859, the Papal States, to which Norcia then belonged, imposed a stringent construction code forbidding structures of more than three storeys and requiring the use of certain materials and building techniques.

== Notable people ==
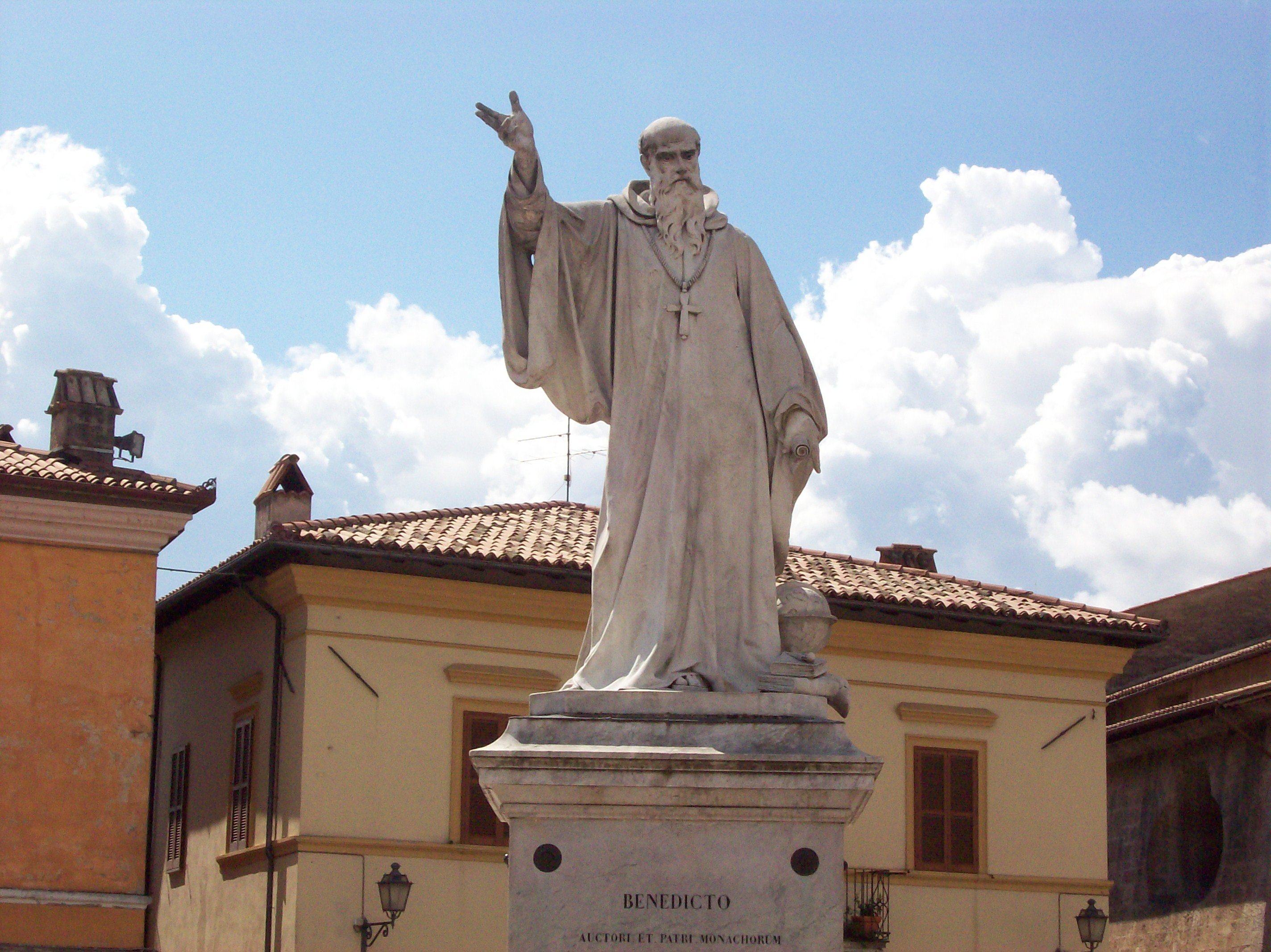
Monument to Saint Benedict in the center of Norcia

Norcia is especially renowned as the birthplace of Benedict of Nursia, the founder of Western monasticism, and of his sister Scholastica.

Other religious figures include Giovanni da Norcia, religious figure; Laureta Fusconi, Christian nun; Lucia da Valcaldara, mystic; Giovanni Desideri, Catholic bishop; and Roberto Tibaldeschi, Catholic bishop.

The Roman general Quintus Sertorius of Norcia followed Scipio in campaigns against the Cimbri. Lucius Plotius of Norcia served twice as consul during the height of Roman power. Vespasia Polla of Norcia became the mother of the emperor Vespasian and grandmother of the emperor Titus.

Among natives of Norcia are Giovanni Battista Lalli, a 17th‑century poet known for the work Travestimento dell'Eneide; Cardinal Teodino degli Atti; Cardinal Giovanni Battista Quarantotto; Girolamo Catena, a 16th‑century writer who left a Latin collection of letters; Benevoli, known as a distinguished anatomist; and the painter Gioseffo del Sole, a pupil of Cavalier d'Arpino.

Artists and writers include Filippo Salvatore Gilii, linguist and scholar; and Virgilio Verucci, playwright. Military figures include Andrea di Tartaglia da Norcia; and Marino da Norcia, condottiero.

Scholars and professionals include Francesco Fusconi, physician and art collector; Laerzio Cherubini, jurist and legal scholar; and Antonio Ferri, engineer and aerospace pioneer. Sportspeople include Filippo Massaroni, athlete.

Among prominent families of the city in the 19th century were the Colizzi, Passarini, Bucchi, Cipriani, Battaglia, Cionci, Paris, Bartoli, Scaramucci, and Cianconi.
