= Solomon Islands earthquakes =

Solomon Islands earthquakes may refer to:

- 1971 Solomon Islands earthquakes
- 2016 Solomon Islands earthquakes
