= Pingshan =

Pingshan may refer to the following locations in China:

- Pingshan County, Hebei (平山县), county of Shijiazhuang City
- Pingshan County, Sichuan (屏山县), county of Yibin City
- Pingshan District, Benxi (平山区), Benxi, Liaoning
- Pingshan District, Shenzhen (坪山区), Shenzhen, Guangdong
- Pingshan, Chongqing (坪山镇)

== Towns ==
- Pingshan, Pingshan County, Hebei

== Townships ==
- Pingshan Township, Fujian (屏山乡), in Datian County
- Pingshan Township, Guangxi (屏山乡), in Long'an County

Written as "平山乡":

- Pingshan Township, Guizhou, in Hezhang County
- Pingshan Township, Hunan, in Zhuzhou County
- Pingshan Township, Inner Mongolia, in Jarud Banner
- Pingshan Township, Jiangsu, in Hanjiang District, Yangzhou
- Pingshan Township, Yunnan, in Lianghe County
