= List of earthquakes in 2016 =

Earthquakes in 2016
Approximate epicenters of notable earthquakes in 2016
- 4.0–5.9 magnitude
- 6.0–6.9 magnitude
- 7.0–7.9 magnitude
- 8.0+ magnitude
- Strongest: 7.9 M_{w}, Papua New Guinea
- Deadliest: 7.8 M_{w}, (Ecuador) Ecuador; 676 deaths
- Total fatalities: 1,585

Number by magnitude
- 9.0+: 0
- 8.0–8.9: 0
- 7.0–7.9: 16
- 6.0–6.9: 127
- 5.0–5.9: 1,507
- 4.0–4.9: 12,771

This is a list of earthquakes in 2016. Only earthquakes of magnitude 6 or above are included, unless they result in damage and/or casualties, or are notable for some other reason. All dates are listed according to UTC time. Maximum intensities are indicated on the Mercalli intensity scale and are sourced from United States Geological Survey (USGS) ShakeMap data. Major events took place in Ecuador, Italy, Taiwan, Indonesia and New Zealand this year, while the strongest tremor was observed in Papua New Guinea. 2016 was also the first year since 2002 with no magnitude 8+ earthquakes.

== Compared to other years ==
Number of earthquakes worldwide for 2006–2016
Magnitude	2006	2007	2008	2009	2010	2011	2012	2013	2014	2015	2016
8.0–9.9	2	4	1	1	1	1	2	2	1	1	0
7.0–7.9	9	14	12	16	21	19	15	17	11	18	16
6.0–6.9	142	178	168	144	151	204	129	125	140	124	127
5.0–5.9	1,712	2,074	1,768	1,896	1,963	2,271	1,412	1,402	1,475	1,413	1,507
4.0–4.9	12,838	12,080	12,292	6,805	10,164	13,303	10,990	9,795	13,494	13,239	12,771
Total	14,703	14,350	14,240	8,862	12,300	15,798	12,548	11,341	15,121	14,795	14,421

An increase in detected earthquake numbers does not necessarily represent an increase in earthquakes per se. Population increase, habitation spread, and advances in earthquake detection technology all contribute to higher earthquake numbers being recorded over time.

== By death toll ==
Map of earthquakes in 2016. A total of 16,975 earthquakes are plotted.

Rank	Death toll	Magnitude	Location	MMI	Depth (km)	Date
1	676	7.8	Ecuador, Esmeraldas	VIII (Severe)	20.6	April 16
2	299	6.2	Italy, Umbria	XI (Extreme)	4.4	August 24
3	273	7.0	Japan, Kyushu	IX (Violent)	10.0	April 15
4	117	6.4	Taiwan, Kaohsiung	VII (Very strong)	23.0	February 6
5	104	6.5	Indonesia, Aceh	VIII (Severe)	13.0	December 6
6	23	5.9	Tanzania, Kagera Region	VII (Very strong)	40.0	September 10
7	11	6.7	India, Imphal	VII (Very strong)	55.0	January 3

Listed are earthquakes with at least 10 dead.

== By magnitude ==
Rank	Magnitude	Death toll	Location	MMI	Depth (km)	Date
1	7.9	0	Papua New Guinea, New Ireland	VII (Very strong)	93.0	December 17
2	7.8	676	Ecuador, Esmeraldas	VIII (Severe)	20.6	April 16
2	7.8	0	Indonesia, Sumatra	III (Weak)	24.0	March 2
2	7.8	2	New Zealand, South Island	IX (Violent)	22.0	November 14
2	7.8	1	Solomon Islands, Kirakira	VIII (Severe)	41.0	December 8
6	7.7	0	Northern Mariana Islands	VI (Strong)	212.4	July 29
7	7.6	0	Chile, Los Lagos	VIII (Severe)	35.2	December 25
8	7.4	0	South Georgia and the South Sandwich Islands	I (Not felt)	10.0	August 19
9	7.2	0	Russia, Kamchatka	VII (Very strong)	163.2	January 30
9	7.2	0	South Georgia and the South Sandwich Islands	VI (Strong)	72.7	May 28
9	7.2	0	New Caledonia	V (Moderate)	9.9	August 12
12	7.1	0	United States, Alaska	VII (Very strong)	125.6	January 24
12	7.1	0	Ascension Island	I (Not felt)	10.0	August 29
14	7.0	273	Japan, Kyushu	IX (Violent)	10.0	April 15
14	7.0	0	Vanuatu	VII (Very strong)	27.2	April 28
14	7.0	0	New Zealand, North Island	VI (Strong)	19.0	September 1

Listed are earthquakes with at least 7.0 magnitude.

== By month ==
=== January ===
January
- Strongest: 7.2 M_{w}, Russia
- Deadliest: 6.7 M_{w}, (India) India; 11 deaths
- Total fatalities: 13

Number by magnitude
- 8.0–8.9: 0
- 7.0–7.9: 2
- 6.0–6.9: 11
- 5.0–5.9: 119
- 4.0–4.9: 1,024

- A magnitude 6.3 earthquake struck the Western Indian-Antarctic Ridge on January 1 at a depth of 10.0 km (6.2 mi). The shock had a maximum intensity of I (Not felt).
- A magnitude 6.7 earthquake struck India 29 km (18 mi) west of Imphal in the state of Manipur on January 3 at a depth of 55.0 km (34.2 mi). The shock had a maximum intensity of VII (Very strong). At least 11 people were killed (six in India and five in Bangladesh), 200 others were injured and a large number of buildings were damaged.
- A magnitude 6.0 earthquake struck the Pacific-Antarctic Ridge on January 5 at a depth of 10.0 km (6.2 mi). The shock had a maximum intensity of I (Not felt).
- A magnitude 5.0 earthquake struck Turkey 13 km (8.1 mi) southwest of Yerköy on January 10 at a depth of 10.0 km (6.2 mi). The shock had a maximum intensity of V (Moderate). One person was injured and several buildings were damaged, including one which later collapsed in the Yerköy area.
- A magnitude 6.5 earthquake struck Indonesia 8 km (5.0 mi) east of the Talaud Islands, North Sulawesi on January 11 at a depth of 13.0 km (8.1 mi). The shock had a maximum intensity of VI (Strong).
- A magnitude 6.2 earthquake struck Japan 74 km (46 mi) northwest of Rumoi on the island of Hokkaido on January 11 at a depth of 238.8 km (148.4 mi). The shock had a maximum intensity of IV (Light).
- A magnitude 6.1 earthquake struck Bolivia 14 km (8.7 mi) west northwest of Charagua, Cordillera Province on January 14 at a depth of 582.6 km (362.0 mi). The shock had a maximum intensity of II (Weak).
- A magnitude 6.7 earthquake struck offshore of Japan 52 km (32 mi) southeast of Shizunai on the island of Hokkaido on January 14 at a depth of 46.0 km (28.6 mi). The shock had a maximum intensity of VI (Strong).
- A magnitude 5.6 earthquake struck Indonesia 107 km (66 mi) west of Ambon, Maluku on January 16 at a depth of 4.1 km (2.5 mi). The shock had a maximum intensity of VII (Very strong). One person died, 19 were injured and about 120 houses were damaged in two villages on Ambelau island.
- A magnitude 5.9 earthquake struck China 91 km (57 mi) west southwest of Wuwei, Gansu province on January 20 at a depth of 9.0 km (5.6 mi). The shock had a maximum intensity of VII (Very strong). Nine people were injured and 600 houses were damaged.
- A magnitude 6.6 earthquake struck offshore of Mexico 203 km (126 mi) southwest of La Cruz de Loreto, Jalisco state on January 21 at a depth of 10.0 km (6.2 mi). The shock had a maximum intensity of IV (Light).
- A magnitude 7.1 earthquake struck the United States 47 km (29 mi) east southeast of Pedro Bay, Alaska on January 24 at a depth of 125.6 km (78.0 mi). The shock had a maximum intensity of VII (Very strong). Four homes were destroyed in Kenai after a gas leak.
- A magnitude 4.4 earthquake struck Ethiopia 2 km (1.2 mi) north of Hawassa on January 24 at a depth of 10.0 km (6.2 mi). About 100 students sustained minor injuries and there were power outages in Awasa.
- A magnitude 6.3 earthquake struck offshore of Morocco 49 km (30 mi) north northeast of Al Hoceima on January 25 at a depth of 12.0 km (7.5 mi). The shock had a maximum intensity of VI (Strong). An 8-year-old child died, fifteen were injured and some buildings were damaged; it also caused a blackout in the region.
- A magnitude 6.1 earthquake struck offshore of Papua New Guinea 151 km (94 mi) southeast of Kokopo, New Britain on January 26 at a depth of 26.0 km (16.2 mi). The shock had a maximum intensity of IV (Light).
- A magnitude 7.2 earthquake struck Russia 80 km (50 mi) south of Milkovo on the Kamchatka Peninsula on January 30 at a depth of 177.0 km (110.0 mi). The shock had a maximum intensity of VII (Very strong).
- A magnitude 6.1 earthquake struck offshore of Antarctica 473 km (294 mi) northeast of the Balleny Islands on January 31 at a depth of 10.0 km (6.2 mi). The shock had a maximum intensity of I (Not felt).

=== February ===
February
- Strongest: 6.4 M_{w}, Taiwan; 6.4 M_{w}, Papua New Guinea
- Deadliest: 6.4 M_{w}, Taiwan; 117 deaths
- Total fatalities: 118

Number by magnitude
- 8.0–8.9: 0
- 7.0–7.9: 0
- 6.0–6.9: 10
- 5.0–5.9: 93
- 4.0–4.9: 982

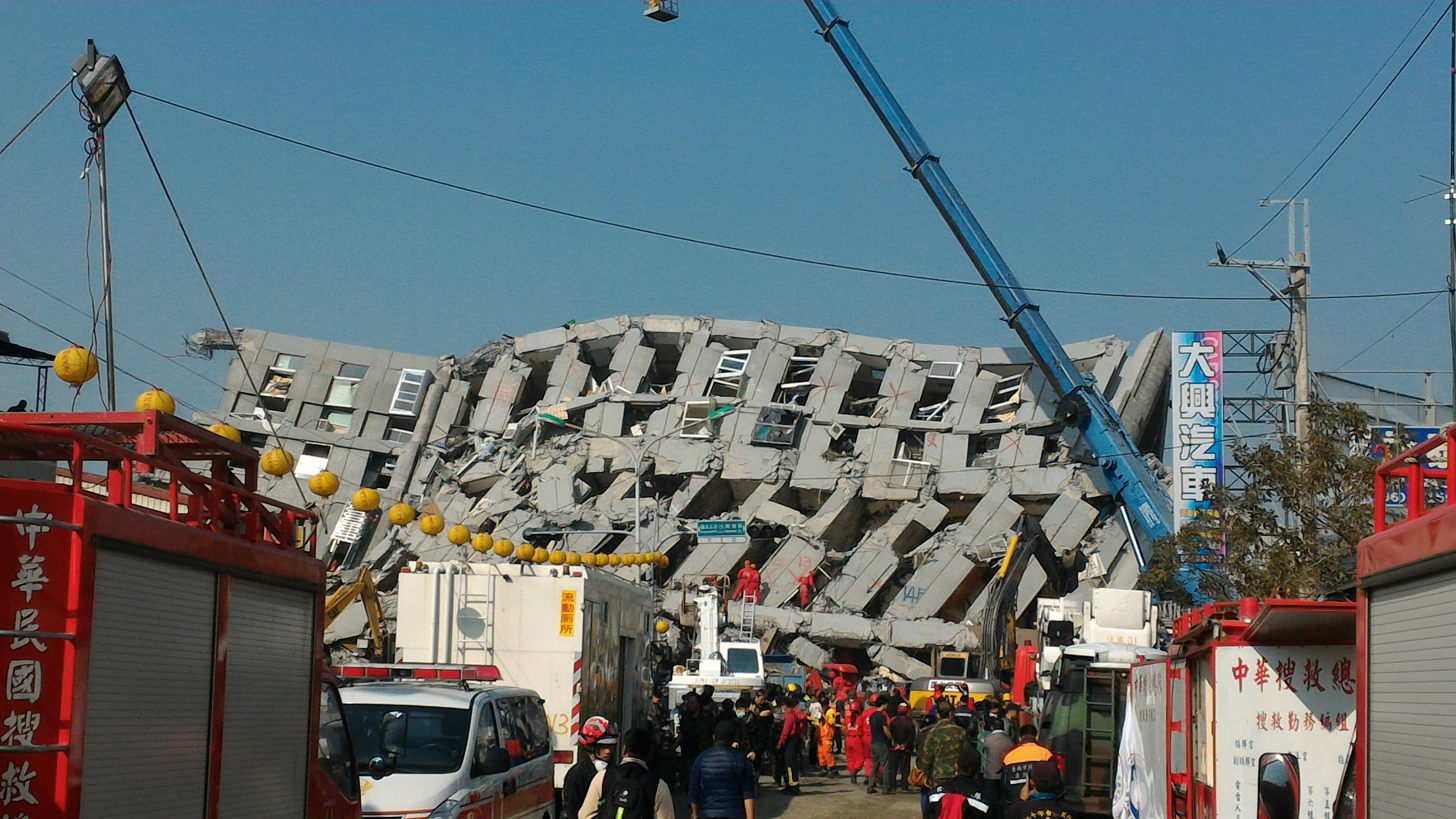
The collapsed 17-story Weiguan Jinlong residential building

- A magnitude 6.2 earthquake struck offshore of New Zealand 125 km (78 mi) northwest of L'Esperance Rock on February 1 at a depth of 391.0 km (243.0 mi). The shock had a maximum intensity of III (Weak).
- A magnitude 5.2 earthquake struck Nepal 19 km (12 mi) north of Kathmandu on February 5 at a depth of 23.5 km (14.6 mi). The shock had a maximum intensity of IV (Light). 66 people were injured in Nepal during this earthquake, while one person died of a heart attack in Muzaffarpur, India.
- A magnitude 6.4 earthquake struck Taiwan 25 km (16 mi) southeast of the Yujing district of Tainan City on February 6 at a depth of 23.0 km (14.3 mi). The shock had a maximum intensity of VII (Very strong). Numerous buildings, including a residential tower, collapsed in Yongkang district. 117 people were killed and 550 were injured.
- A magnitude 6.4 earthquake struck offshore of Papua New Guinea 88 km (55 mi) west southwest of Panguna on February 8 at a depth of 29.0 km (18.0 mi). The shock had a maximum intensity of V (Moderate).
- A magnitude 4.7 earthquake struck Algeria 1 km (0.62 mi) south southeast of Bougara on February 10 at a depth of 11.1 km (6.9 mi). The shock had a maximum intensity of V (Moderate). Several people were injured and some damage was caused to private houses and schools.
- A magnitude 6.0 earthquake struck offshore of Tonga 32 km (20 mi) west northwest of Haveluloto on February 15 at a depth of 10.0 km (6.2 mi). The shock had a maximum intensity of VI (Strong).
- A magnitude 6.3 earthquake struck Indonesia 94 km (58 mi) west of Waingapu, East Nusa Tenggara on February 12 at a depth of 28.0 km (17.4 mi). The shock had a maximum intensity of VI (Strong).
- A magnitude 5.8 earthquake struck New Zealand 12 km (7.5 mi) east northeast of Christchurch on February 14 at a depth of 7.6 km (4.7 mi). The shock had a maximum intensity of VIII (Severe). Minor damage was reported and parts of the region suffered from liquefaction. A part of Godley Head collapsed and other cliffs collapsed as well.
- A magnitude 6.0 earthquake struck offshore of Tonga 32 km (20 mi) west northwest of Haveluloto on February 15 at a depth of 10.0 km (6.2 mi). The shock had a maximum intensity of VI (Strong).
- A magnitude 5.3 earthquake struck Greece 14 km (8.7 mi) east of Krestena on February 15 at a depth of 28.6 km (17.8 mi). The shock had a maximum intensity of V (Moderate). Dozens of buildings were damaged in Krestena mostly in the form of cracks on walls.
- A magnitude 6.1 earthquake struck the southern East Pacific Rise on February 16 at a depth of 13.0 km (8.1 mi). The shock had a maximum intensity of I (Not felt).
- A magnitude 6.0 earthquake struck Indonesia 151 km (94 mi) southeast of Tobelo on February 17 at a depth of 9.0 km (5.6 mi). The shock had a maximum intensity of VI (Strong).
- A magnitude 5.0 earthquake struck Peru 10 km (6.2 mi) south southwest of Maca on February 20 at a depth of 10.0 km (6.2 mi). The shock had a maximum intensity of IV (Light). Three people were injured, 24 houses were destroyed and 104 others were damaged. A road was also blocked by a landslide.
- A magnitude 5.1 earthquake struck Nepal 40 km (25 mi) northeast of Bharatpur on February 21 at a depth of 16.7 km (10.4 mi). The shock had a maximum intensity of IV (Light). One person was injured while fleeing his home due to panic.
- A magnitude 6.0 earthquake struck Chile 105 km (65 mi) west southwest of Coquimbo on February 22 at a depth of 12.0 km (7.5 mi). The shock had a maximum intensity of IV (Light). This was an aftershock of the 6.3 quake.
- A magnitude 5.4 earthquake struck Indonesia 30 km (19 mi) north of Ternate on February 23 at a depth of 13.7 km (8.5 mi). The shock had a maximum intensity of III (Weak). A total of 113 buildings were damaged, some of them severely.
- A magnitude 6.1 earthquake struck the Western Pacific-Antarctic Ridge on February 27 at a depth of 10.0 km (6.2 mi). The shock had a maximum intensity of I (Not felt).

=== March ===
March
- Strongest: 7.8 M_{w} Indonesia

Number by magnitude
- 8.0–8.9: 0
- 7.0–7.9: 1
- 6.0–6.9: 4
- 5.0–5.9: 99
- 4.0–4.9: 990

- A magnitude 7.8 earthquake struck offshore of Indonesia 659 km (409 mi) southwest of Muara Siberut, Mentawai Islands on March 2 at a depth of 24.0 km (14.9 mi). The shock had a maximum intensity of III (Weak).
- A magnitude 6.3 earthquake struck offshore of the United States 72 km (45 mi) south southeast of Atka, Alaska on March 12 at a depth of 19.0 km (11.8 mi). The shock had a maximum intensity of IV (Light).
- A magnitude 6.0 earthquake struck offshore of the United States 75 km (47 mi) south of Atka, Alaska on March 19 at a depth of 17.0 km (10.6 mi). The shock had a maximum intensity of IV (Light). This was an aftershock of the 6.3 quake.
- A magnitude 6.0 earthquake struck offshore of Antigua and Barbuda 126 km (78 mi) east northeast of Codrington on March 19 at a depth of 26.0 km (16.2 mi). The shock had a maximum intensity of IV (Light).
- A magnitude 6.4 earthquake struck offshore of Russia 216 km (134 mi) south of Ust'-Kamchatsk Staryy, Kamchatka Peninsula on March 20 at a depth of 30.0 km (18.6 mi). The shock had a maximum intensity of IV (Light).

=== April ===
April
- Strongest: 7.8 M_{w} Ecuador
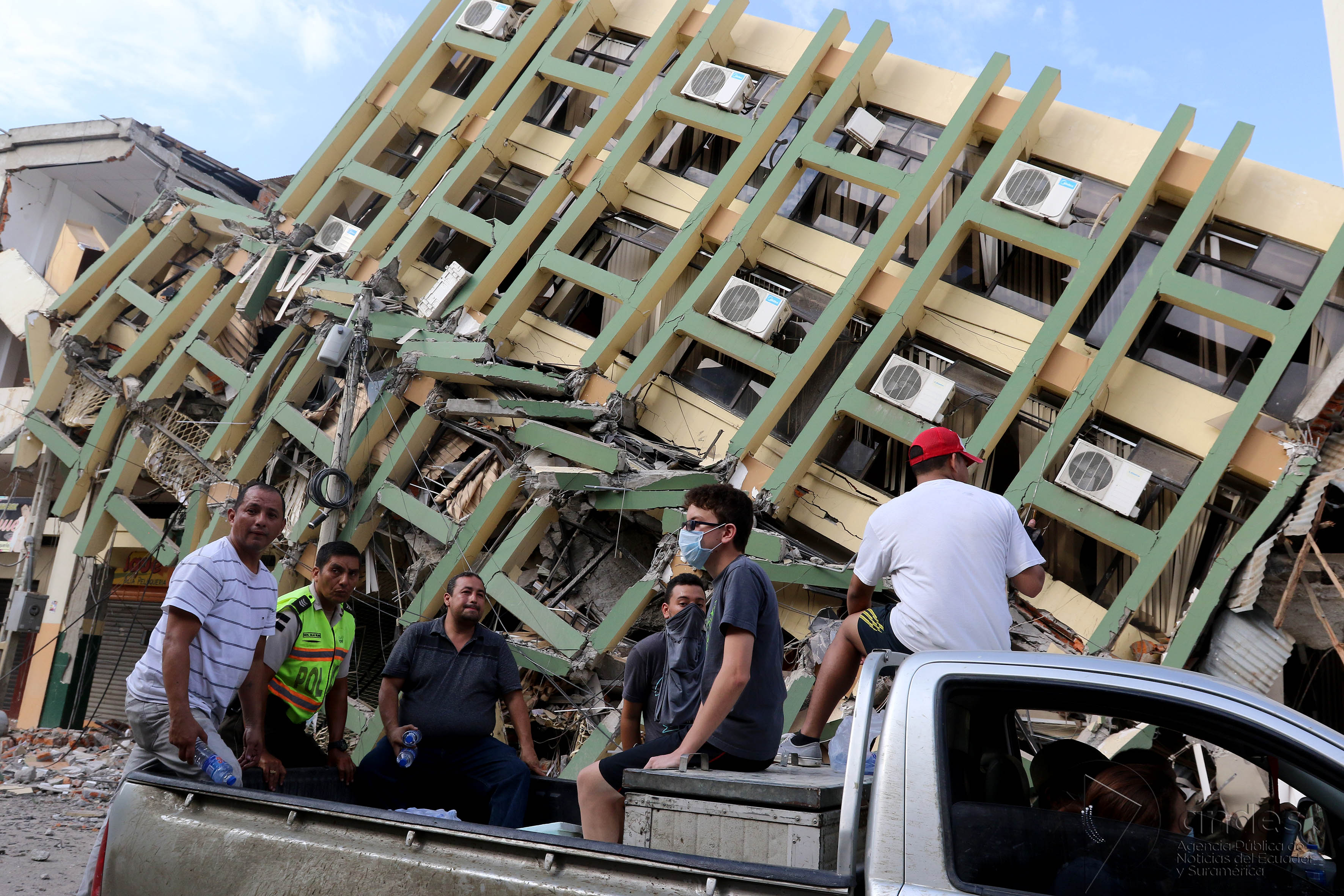
- Deadliest: 7.8 M_{w} Ecuador; 676 deaths Buildings collapsed in Portoviejo after the earthquake
- Total fatalities: 970

Number by magnitude
- 8.0–8.9: 0
- 7.0–7.9: 3
- 6.0–6.9: 20
- 5.0–5.9: 136
- 4.0–4.9: 1,276

- A magnitude 6.2 earthquake struck Papua New Guinea 119 km (74 mi) northeast of Angoram, East Sepik on April 1 at a depth of 6.0 km (3.7 mi). The shock had a maximum intensity of V (Moderate).
- A magnitude 6.2 earthquake struck the United States 42 km (26 mi) east of Port Heiden, Alaska on April 2 at a depth of 11.4 km (7.1 mi). The shock had a maximum intensity of VII (Very strong).
- A magnitude 6.9 earthquake struck Vanuatu 82 km (51 mi) north northwest of Port-Olry on April 3 at a depth of 26.0 km (16.2 mi). The shock had a maximum intensity of VI (Strong).
- A magnitude 6.7 earthquake struck Vanuatu 102 km (63 mi) west southwest of Sola on April 6 at a depth of 24.0 km (14.9 mi). The shock had a maximum intensity of VI (Strong). This was an aftershock of the 6.9 quake.
- A magnitude 6.1 earthquake struck offshore of Indonesia 111 km (69 mi) south of Banjar, West Java on April 6 at a depth of 29.0 km (18.0 mi). The shock had a maximum intensity of IV (Light).
- A magnitude 6.7 earthquake struck Vanuatu 104 km (65 mi) west of Sola on April 7 at a depth of 27.6 km (17.1 mi). The shock had a maximum intensity of V (Moderate). This was an aftershock of the 6.9 quake.
- A magnitude 4.1 earthquake struck Nepal 4 km (2.5 mi) south southwest of Patan on April 9 at a depth of 10.2 km (6.3 mi). At least three people were injured.
- A magnitude 6.6 earthquake struck Afghanistan 42 km (26 mi) west southwest of Ashkasham, Badakhshan Province on April 10 at a depth of 212.0 km (131.7 mi). The shock had a maximum intensity of IV (Light). Ten people were killed and 46 injured in Pakistan.
- A magnitude 5.7 earthquake struck Indonesia 39 km (24 mi) south of Bengkulu on April 10 at a depth of 41.0 km (25.5 mi). Four homes collapsed and 60 others were damaged.
- A magnitude 4.8 earthquake struck Algeria 17 km (11 mi) west northwest of Aïn Bessem on April 11 at a depth of 14.6 km (9.1 mi). Five people were injured, two walls collapsed and 77 structures damaged in the epicentral area.
- A magnitude 6.9 earthquake struck Myanmar 76 km (47 mi) southeast of Mawlaik on April 13 at a depth of 136.0 km (84.5 mi). The shock had a maximum intensity of VI (Strong). 2 people were killed and 70 injured in Assam, India. 50 people were hurt in Chittagong, Bangladesh.
- A magnitude 6.0 earthquake struck the Philippines 15 km (9.3 mi) northwest of Siocon, Zamboanga del Norte on April 13 at a depth of 17.0 km (10.6 mi). The shock had a maximum intensity of VII (Very strong). Three people were injured when a wall fell on them and five homes collapsed.
- A magnitude 6.2 earthquake struck Japan 2 km (1.2 mi) south southeast of Kumamoto City on April 14 at a depth of 9.0 km (5.6 mi). The shock had a maximum intensity of VII (Very strong). Nine people were killed, while more than 800 others were injured. At least 20 homes and a wall of the Kumamoto Castle collapsed, while more than 24,000 people were forced to spend several nights in shelters. This was a foreshock of the 7.0 quake.
- A magnitude 6.0 earthquake struck Japan 5 km (3.1 mi) east northeast of Uto, Kumamoto Prefecture on April 14 at a depth of 8.0 km (5.0 mi). The shock had a maximum intensity of VII (Very strong). This was a foreshock of the 7.0 quake.
- A magnitude 6.4 earthquake struck Vanuatu 89 km (55 mi) northwest of Port-Olry on April 14 at a depth of 16.0 km (9.9 mi). The shock had a maximum intensity of VI (Strong). This was an aftershock of the 6.9 quake.
- A magnitude 6.1 earthquake struck offshore of Guatemala 110 km (68 mi) south southwest of Champerico, Retalhuleu department on April 15 at a depth of 22.4 km (13.9 mi). The shock had a maximum intensity of IV (Light).
- A magnitude 7.0 earthquake struck Japan 6 km (3.7 mi) east southeast of Kumamoto City on April 15 at a depth of 10.0 km (6.2 mi). The shock had a maximum intensity of IX (Violent). A total of 273 people were killed and more than 1,000 others were injured, many of which were indirect. 8,700 buildings were damaged and a bridge collapsed in Aso, Kumamoto Prefecture.
- A magnitude 7.8 earthquake struck Ecuador 27 km (17 mi) south southeast of Muisne in Esmeraldas province on April 16 at a depth of 20.6 km (12.8 mi). The shock had a maximum intensity of VIII (Severe). 668 people were killed, 8 missing and over 6,200 injured. 7,000 buildings were destroyed or damaged.
- A magnitude 6.2 earthquake struck offshore of South Georgia and the South Sandwich Islands 108 km (67 mi) north of Visokoi Island on April 19 at a depth of 14.0 km (8.7 mi). The shock had a maximum intensity of IV (Light).
- A magnitude 6.2 earthquake struck Ecuador 21 km (13 mi) west of Muisne in Esmeraldas province on April 20 at a depth of 14.0 km (8.7 mi). The shock had a maximum intensity of VI (Strong). This was an aftershock of the 7.8 quake.
- A magnitude 6.0 earthquake struck Ecuador 10 km (6.2 mi) north of Muisne in Esmeraldas province on April 20 at a depth of 10.0 km (6.2 mi). The shock had a maximum intensity of VII (Very strong). This was an aftershock of the 7.8 quake.
- A magnitude 6.0 earthquake struck Ecuador 34 km (21 mi) north northwest of Bahia de Caraquez in Manabi province on April 22 at a depth of 10.0 km (6.2 mi). The shock had a maximum intensity of VII (Very strong). This was an aftershock of the 7.8 quake.
- A magnitude 6.0 earthquake struck offshore of Mexico 83 km (52 mi) west southwest of Puerto Madero, Chiapas on April 25 at a depth of 16.0 km (9.9 mi). The shock had a maximum intensity of IV (Light).
- A magnitude 6.0 earthquake struck offshore of Mexico 75 km (47 mi) west southwest of Puerto Madero, Chiapas on April 27 at a depth of 16.0 km (9.9 mi). The shock had a maximum intensity of IV (Light).
- A magnitude 3.9 earthquake struck France 6 km (3.7 mi) west southwest of Châtelaillon-Plage on April 28 at a depth of 10.0 km (6.2 mi). The shock had a maximum intensity of IV (Light). The quake caused slight damage in La Rochelle.
- A magnitude 7.0 earthquake struck Vanuatu 3 km (1.9 mi) northwest of Norsup on April 28 at a depth of 24.0 km (14.9 mi). The shock had a maximum intensity of VII (Very strong). Items were knocked off shelves and power was cut in Luganville.
- (France) A magnitude 6.6 earthquake struck 602 km (374 mi) east of the French Pacific minor territory of Clipperton Island on April 29 at a depth of 10.0 km (6.2 mi). The shock had a maximum intensity of I (Not felt).

=== May ===
May
- Strongest: 7.2 M_{w} South Georgia and the South Sandwich Islands
- Deadliest: 4.9 M_{w} Yemen; 4 deaths
- Total fatalities: 5

Number by magnitude
- 8.0–8.9: 0
- 7.0–7.9: 1
- 6.0–6.9: 6
- 5.0–5.9: 87
- 4.0–4.9: 1,084

- A magnitude 5.2 earthquake struck China 227 km (141 mi) west northwest of Qamdo, Tibet Autonomous Region on May 11 at a depth of 8.0 km (5.0 mi). The shock had a maximum intensity of VI (Strong). Sixty people were reported injured, six seriously; with collapsed houses and bridges and roads damaged due to landslides.
- A magnitude 4.5 earthquake struck Mexico 3 km (1.9 mi) southeast of Nextipac, Jalisco on May 11 at a depth of 10.0 km (6.2 mi). The shock had a maximum intensity of IV (Light). One person injured, buildings damaged and landslides occurred in Guadalajara and Zapotlan.
- A magnitude 4.8 earthquake struck China 3 km (1.9 mi) southeast of Dali, Yunnan on May 16 at a depth of 54.0 km (33.6 mi). Two people injured, 192 houses destroyed and 37,980 others damaged in the Eryuan-Jianchang-Yunlong area.
- A magnitude 6.7 earthquake struck Ecuador 32 km (20 mi) southeast of Muisne in Esmeraldas province on May 18 at a depth of 16.0 km (9.9 mi). The shock had a maximum intensity of VII (Very strong). Power cuts were reported near the epicenter. This was an aftershock of the 7.8 quake in April.
- A magnitude 6.9 earthquake struck Ecuador 24 km (15 mi) northwest of Rosa Zarate (also called Quinindé) in Esmeraldas province on May 18 at a depth of 29.9 km (18.6 mi). The shock had a maximum intensity of VII (Very strong). One person was killed in Tosagua. This was an aftershock of the 7.8 quake in April.
- A magnitude 6.0 earthquake struck Australia 116 km (72 mi) west southwest of Yulara in the Northern Territory on May 20 at a depth of 10.0 km (6.2 mi). The shock had a maximum intensity of VIII (Severe).
- A magnitude 4.9 earthquake struck Yemen 28 km (17 mi) west northwest of Al Bayda on May 24 at a depth of 10.0 km (6.2 mi). Four people were killed and several houses collapsed in Merkhah Al Ulya district. Rockfalls occurred in the Usaylan area. The shock had a maximum intensity of V (Moderate).
- A magnitude 6.4 earthquake struck Fiji 18 km (11 mi) south southeast of Ndoi Island on May 27 at a depth of 567.5 km (352.6 mi). The shock had a maximum intensity of II (Weak). This was an foreshock of the 6.9 quake.
- A magnitude 6.9 earthquake struck offshore of Fiji 155 km (96 mi) south southeast of Ndoi Island on May 28 at a depth of 405.7 km (252.1 mi). The shock had a maximum intensity of III (Weak).
- A magnitude 7.2 earthquake struck offshore of South Georgia and the South Sandwich Islands 53 km (33 mi) north northeast of Visokoi Island on May 28 at a depth of 78.0 km (48.5 mi). The shock had a maximum intensity of VI (Strong).
- A magnitude 5.4 earthquake struck Algeria 16 km (9.9 mi) south southwest of Lakhdaria, Bouïra Province on May 29 at a depth of 11.4 km (7.1 mi). The shock had a maximum intensity of VII (Very strong). Some houses and buildings collapsed in the region, and 28 people were injured, three of them seriously.
- A magnitude 6.4 earthquake struck offshore of Taiwan 87 km (54 mi) northeast of Jiufen on May 31 at a depth of 246.4 km (153.1 mi). The shock had a maximum intensity of IV (Light).

=== June ===
June
- Strongest: 6.6 M_{w} Indonesia
- Deadliest: 6.6 M_{w} Indonesia; 1 death
- Total fatalities: 1

Number by magnitude
- 8.0–8.9: 0
- 7.0–7.9: 0
- 6.0–6.9: 15
- 5.0–5.9: 111
- 4.0–4.9: 1,149

- A magnitude 6.6 earthquake struck Indonesia 80 km (50 mi) west of Sungai Penuh, Jambi on June 1 at a depth of 50.0 km (31.1 mi). The shock had a maximum intensity of VI (Strong). One person died of a heart attack during this earthquake, 18 were injured and more than 2,000 houses suffered damage.
- A magnitude 6.3 earthquake struck Indonesia 133 km (83 mi) southwest of Leksula, Maluku on June 5 at a depth of 429.6 km (266.9 mi). The shock had a maximum intensity of III (Weak).
- A magnitude 6.1 earthquake struck offshore of New Zealand 84 km (52 mi) south of Raoul Island on June 6 at a depth of 43.8 km (27.2 mi). The shock had a maximum intensity of IV (Light).
- A magnitude 6.3 earthquake struck offshore of Mexico 106 km (66 mi) south southwest of Barra de Navidad, Jalisco state on June 7 at a depth of 10.0 km (6.2 mi). The shock had a maximum intensity of IV (Light).
- A magnitude 6.3 earthquake struck Indonesia 125 km (78 mi) west northwest of Kota Ternate, North Maluku on June 7 at a depth of 31.0 km (19.3 mi). The shock had a maximum intensity of VI (Strong). Four houses collapsed, 14 others and a church were damaged in the Ternate area.
- A magnitude 6.1 earthquake struck offshore of Indonesia 279 km (173 mi) south of Lembar, West Nusa Tenggara on June 9 at a depth of 19.0 km (11.8 mi). The shock had a maximum intensity of III (Weak).
- A magnitude 6.1 earthquake struck Nicaragua 23 km (14 mi) east of Puerto Morazan, Chinandega on June 10 at a depth of 10.0 km (6.2 mi). The shock had a maximum intensity of VI (Strong). Twelve houses were destroyed and 86 others suffered damage in Chinandega, but no injuries were reported. Twelve houses were destroyed and 188 others were damaged in southern Honduras.
- A magnitude 6.2 earthquake struck the Solomon Islands 18 km (11 mi) west northwest of Auki on June 10 at a depth of 30.4 km (18.9 mi). The shock had a maximum intensity of VI (Strong).
- A magnitude 6.2 earthquake struck Vanuatu 98 km (61 mi) north northwest of Isangel on June 14 at a depth of 111.0 km (69.0 mi). The shock had a maximum intensity of IV (Light).
- A magnitude 5.2 earthquake struck Japan 22 km (14 mi) east northeast of Honchō on June 16 at a depth of 14.3 km (8.9 mi). One person was injured and three homes were damaged in Hakodate.
- A magnitude 6.3 earthquake struck offshore of Vanuatu 84 km (52 mi) south southwest of Isangel on June 19 at a depth of 13.0 km (8.1 mi). The shock had a maximum intensity of V (Moderate).
- A magnitude 6.0 earthquake struck offshore of Vanuatu 91 km (57 mi) southwest of Isangel on June 20 at a depth of 15.0 km (9.3 mi). The shock had a maximum intensity of IV (Light). This was an aftershock of the 6.3 quake.
- A magnitude 6.1 earthquake struck the Northern Mid-Atlantic Ridge on June 21 at a depth of 10.0 km (6.2 mi). The shock had a maximum intensity of I (Not felt).
- A magnitude 6.3 earthquake struck Papua New Guinea 91 km (57 mi) north northwest of Rabaul, New Britain on June 21 at a depth of 354.0 km (220.0 mi). The shock had a maximum intensity of III (Weak).
- A magnitude 4.7 earthquake struck Indonesia 104 km (65 mi) west southwest of Manismata, West Kalimantan on June 21 at a depth of 15.3 km (9.5 mi). The shock had a maximum intensity of V (Moderate). Several houses were damaged in Kendawangan.
- A magnitude 6.4 earthquake struck Kyrgyzstan 92 km (57 mi) east of Kyzyl-Eshme on June 26 at a depth of 13.0 km (8.1 mi). The shock had a maximum intensity of VII (Very strong).
- A magnitude 6.0 earthquake struck Vanuatu 7 km (4.3 mi) northeast of Lakatoro on June 30 at a depth of 27.0 km (16.8 mi). The shock had a maximum intensity of V (Moderate).

=== July ===
July
- Strongest: 7.7 M_{w} Northern Mariana Islands
- Deadliest: 6.3 M_{w} Ecuador; 2 deaths
- Total fatalities: 3

Number by magnitude
- 8.0–8.9: 0
- 7.0–7.9: 1
- 6.0–6.9: 6
- 5.0–5.9: 119
- 4.0–4.9: 1,044

- A magnitude 5.0 earthquake struck Tajikistan 22 km (14 mi) southeast of Rasht on July 1 at a depth of 10.0 km (6.2 mi). The shock had a maximum intensity of VI (Strong). Twenty-nine houses and three schools were destroyed in Rasht.
- A magnitude 5.1 earthquake struck West Sumatra, Indonesia 48 km (30 mi) northwest of Bukittinggi on July 10 at a depth of 8.1 km (5.0 mi). The shock had a maximum intensity of IV (Light). One person killed by a falling rock in Agam Regency.
- A magnitude 6.0 earthquake struck offshore of Tonga 115 km (71 mi) north northeast of Hihifo on July 10 at a depth of 8.0 km (5.0 mi). The shock had a maximum intensity of IV (Light).
- A magnitude 6.3 earthquake struck Ecuador 33 km (21 mi) north northwest of Rosa Zarate (also called Quinindé) in Esmeraldas province on July 11 at a depth of 21.0 km (13.0 mi). The shock had a maximum intensity of VII (Very strong). Two people died during this earthquake.
- A magnitude 6.3 earthquake struck offshore of New Zealand 199 km (124 mi) northeast of Raoul Island on July 13 at a depth of 12.0 km (7.5 mi). The shock had a maximum intensity of III (Weak).
- A magnitude 6.1 earthquake struck Vanuatu 71 km (44 mi) north northwest of Isangel on July 20 at a depth of 167.0 km (103.8 mi). The shock had a maximum intensity of IV (Light).
- A magnitude 6.1 earthquake struck Chile 54 km (34 mi) west northwest of the city of Diego de Almagro on July 25 at a depth of 72.0 km (44.7 mi). The shock had a maximum intensity of V (Moderate).
- A magnitude 6.4 earthquake struck Papua New Guinea 133 km (83 mi) southeast of Lorengau, Manus on July 25 at a depth of 14.0 km (8.7 mi). The shock had a maximum intensity of IV (Light).
- A magnitude 7.7 earthquake struck offshore of the United States trust territory of the Northern Mariana Islands 29 km (18 mi) southwest of Agrihan on July 29 at a depth of 196.0 km (121.8 mi). The shock had a maximum intensity of VI (Strong).
- A magnitude 4.9 earthquake struck China 31 km (19 mi) south of Babu on July 31 at a depth of 24.5 km (15.2 mi). The shock had a maximum intensity of V (Moderate). Around 3,000 homes were damaged in Guangxi.
- A magnitude 5.6 earthquake struck Indonesia 43 km (27 mi) east northeast of Pototano, West Nusa Tenggara on July 31 at a depth of 21.0 km (13.0 mi). The shock had a maximum intensity of VI (Strong). A total of 626 homes were damaged or destroyed in Dompu Regency.

=== August ===
August
- Strongest: 7.4 M_{w} South Georgia and the South Sandwich Islands
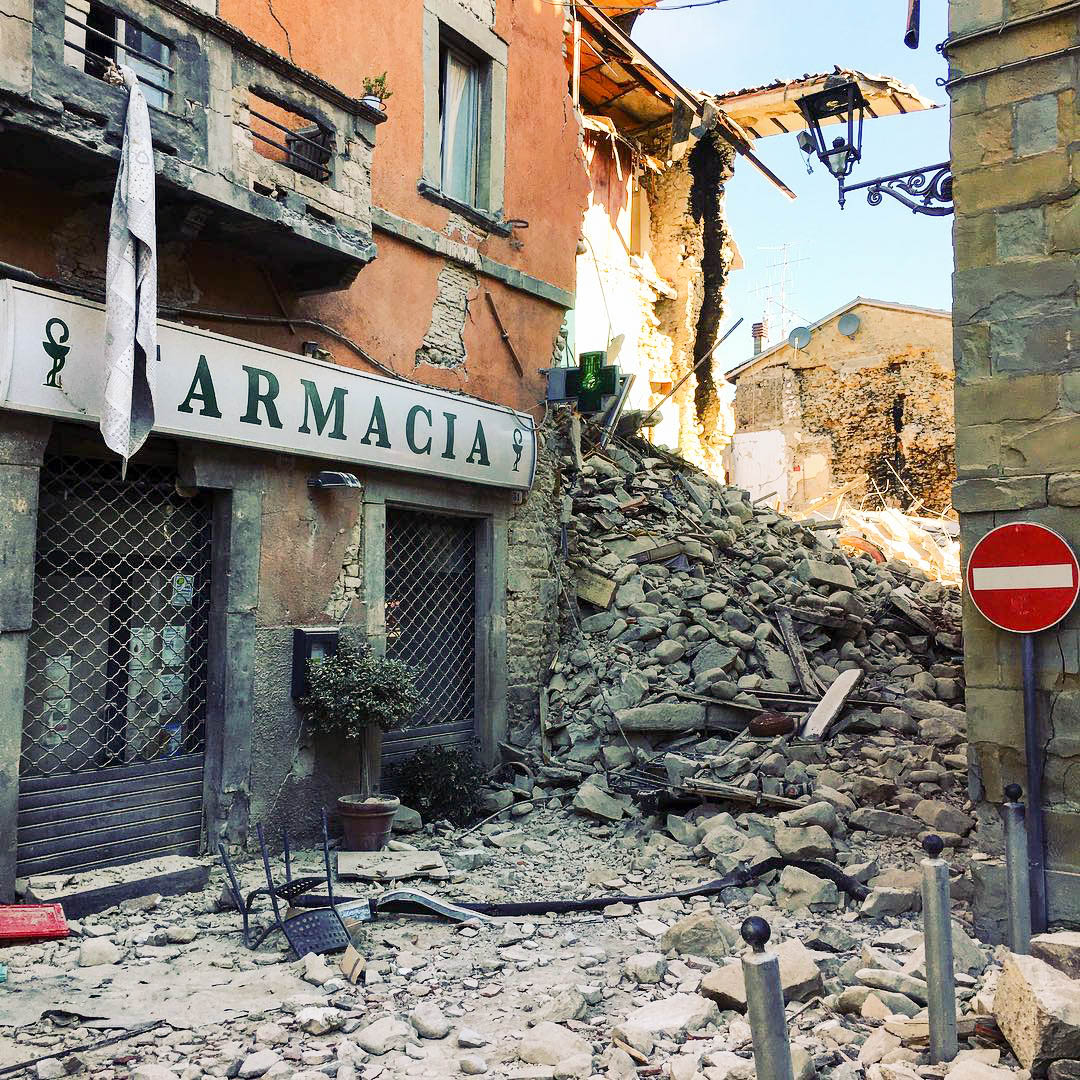
- Deadliest: 6.2 M_{w} (Italy) Italy; 299 deaths Rubble in the town center of Amatrice
- Total fatalities: 310

Number by magnitude
- 8.0–8.9: 0
- 7.0–7.9: 3
- 6.0–6.9: 10
- 5.0–5.9: 140
- 4.0–4.9: 1,236

- A magnitude 5.0 earthquake struck Azerbaijan 11 km (6.8 mi) northwest of Imishli on August 1 at a depth of 16.0 km (9.9 mi). The shock had a maximum intensity of VII (Very strong). One building partially collapsed and several structures were damaged in Imishli district. In Iran, one man died of a heart attack, two others were injured and several old buildings were damaged in Bileh Savar and Parsabad.
- A magnitude 6.2 earthquake struck Argentina 49 km (30 mi) west southwest of La Quiaca, Jujuy on August 4 at a depth of 270.0 km (167.8 mi). The shock had a maximum intensity of IV (Light).
- A magnitude 6.3 earthquake struck offshore of Japan 71 km (44 mi) east northeast of Iwo Jima on August 4 at a depth of 510.0 km (316.9 mi). The shock had a maximum intensity of II (Weak).
- A magnitude 4.8 earthquake struck Ukraine 5 km (3.1 mi) southeast of Mariupol, Donetsk on August 7 at a depth of 10.0 km (6.2 mi). The shock had a maximum intensity of V (Moderate). Some damage occurred in Mariupol, like cracks on walls and plaster.
- A magnitude 4.4 earthquake struck Ecuador 22 km (14 mi) northeast of Sangolquí, Pichincha on August 9 at a depth of 9.1 km (5.7 mi). The shock had a maximum intensity of VI (Strong). Two people were injured, some buildings were damaged and landslides occurred in the Quito-Pichincha area.
- A magnitude 4.4 earthquake struck China 68 km (42 mi) north of Fuling, Chongqing on August 11 at a depth of 15.0 km (9.3 mi). The shock had a maximum intensity of IV (Light). Three people were injured, eight houses collapsed and 873 others were damaged in Dianjiang County.
- A magnitude 7.2 earthquake struck offshore of the French Pacific special collectivity of New Caledonia 110 km (68 mi) east of Île Hunter on August 12 at a depth of 16.4 km (10.2 mi). The shock had a maximum intensity of V (Moderate).
- A magnitude 6.1 earthquake struck offshore of Tonga 225 km (140 mi) southeast of the Minerva Reefs on August 12 at a depth of 112.8 km (70.1 mi). The shock had a maximum intensity of I (Not felt).
- A magnitude 5.5 earthquake struck Peru 11 km (6.8 mi) southwest of Tapay, Arequipa Province on August 15 at a depth of 20.0 km (12.4 mi). The shock had a maximum intensity of VI (Strong). The quake caused nine deaths, including an American tourist, and injured at least 68 people, destroyed 383 houses, and damaged 1,074 others.
- A magnitude 5.7 earthquake struck Australia 37 km (23 mi) north northwest of the Whitsunday Islands in Queensland on August 18 at a depth of 10.0 km (6.2 mi). The shock had a maximum intensity of VI (Strong). The quake, the highest magnitude to affect Queensland in 20 years, caused minor damage and briefly caused the evacuation of some airports.
- A magnitude 6.0 earthquake struck the southern East Pacific Rise on August 18 at a depth of 10 km (6.2 mi). The shock had a maximum intensity of I (Not felt).
- A magnitude 7.4 earthquake struck offshore of South Georgia and the South Sandwich Islands 240 km (150 mi) east southeast of South Georgia on August 19 at a depth of 10.0 km (6.2 mi). The shock had a maximum intensity of III (Weak).
- A magnitude 6.0 earthquake struck offshore of Japan 170 km (110 mi) east northeast of Miyako, Iwate Prefecture on August 20 at a depth of 10.0 km (6.2 mi). The shock had a maximum intensity of IV (Light).
- A magnitude 6.1 earthquake struck offshore of South Georgia and the South Sandwich Islands 240 km (150 mi) east southeast of South Georgia on August 21 at a depth of 12.0 km (7.5 mi). The shock had a maximum intensity of I (Not felt). This was an aftershock of the 7.4 quake.
- A magnitude 6.0 earthquake struck Indonesia 149 km (93 mi) north of Maumere, East Nusa Tenggara on August 23 at a depth of 533.0 km (331.2 mi). The shock had a maximum intensity of II (Weak).
- A magnitude 6.2 earthquake struck Italy 5 km (3.1 mi) west northwest of Accumoli on August 24 at a depth of 4.4 km (2.7 mi). The shock had a maximum intensity of VII (Very strong). 299 people of various nations were killed, 388 were injured, with heavy damage all around the epicenter, especially in Amatrice.
- A magnitude 6.8 earthquake struck Myanmar 26 km (16 mi) west of Chauk on August 24 at a depth of 82.0 km (51.0 mi). The shock had a maximum intensity of VI (Strong). Four people died, 20 were injured, and various stupas in Bagan were damaged.
- A magnitude 2.3 earthquake struck Poland on August 25 at a depth of 1 km (0.62 mi). Four people were injured due to a mine collapse, one of whom died in the hospital.
- A magnitude 7.1 earthquake struck offshore of Ascension Island 955 km (593 mi) north northwest of Georgetown on August 29 at a depth of 10.0 km (6.2 mi). The shock had a maximum intensity of V (Moderate).
- A magnitude 4.6 earthquake struck El Salvador 0 km (0 mi) north northwest of Candelaria de la Frontera on August 29 at a depth of 10.0 km (6.2 mi). The shock had a maximum intensity of VII (Very strong). The walls of several adobe houses and a Red Cross facility in Chalchuapa collapsed and 21 homes in the San Lorenzo-Candelaria de la Frontera area were damaged.
- A magnitude 6.8 earthquake struck Papua New Guinea 90 km (56 mi) northeast of Rabaul, New Britain on August 31 at a depth of 476.0 km (295.8 mi). The shock had a maximum intensity of III (Weak).

=== September ===
September
- Strongest: 7.0 M_{w} New Zealand
- Deadliest: 5.9 M_{w} Tanzania; 23 deaths
- Total fatalities: 32

Number by magnitude
- 8.0–8.9: 0
- 7.0–7.9: 1
- 6.0–6.9: 12
- 5.0–5.9: 164
- 4.0–4.9: 1,268

- A magnitude 7.0 earthquake struck offshore of New Zealand 175 km (109 mi) northeast of Gisborne on September 1 at a depth of 19.0 km (11.8 mi). The shock had a maximum intensity of VI (Strong). A tsunami warning was issued after this earthquake, and waves of 30.0 cm (11.8 in) were reported near Gisborne.
- A magnitude 6.1 earthquake struck offshore of New Zealand 179 km (111 mi) northeast of Ōpōtiki on September 1 at a depth of 13.7 km (8.5 mi). The shock had a maximum intensity of IV (Light). This was an aftershock of the 7.0 quake.
- A magnitude 5.8 earthquake struck the United States 14 km (8.7 mi) northwest of Pawnee, Oklahoma on September 3 at a depth of 5.6 km (3.5 mi). The shock had a maximum intensity of VI (Strong). It is the strongest earthquake ever recorded within the state. One person was injured, and the earthquake caused moderate damage, especially in Pawnee where buildings were damaged.
- A magnitude 4.7 earthquake struck Ecuador 23 km (14 mi) east northeast of Quito on September 5 at a depth of 10.0 km (6.2 mi). The shock had a maximum intensity of V (Moderate). Six people were injured, at least 45 buildings were damaged, landslides and power outages occurred in Quito.
- A magnitude 4.7 earthquake struck Pakistan 9 km (5.6 mi) northeast of Batgram on September 5 at a depth of 25.9 km (16.1 mi). The shock had a maximum intensity of III (Weak). Fifty-seven people were injured in a panicked evacuation of a school. Of those 57, three are reported to be in critical condition.
- A magnitude 6.1 earthquake struck offshore of Russia 185 km (115 mi) east southeast of Nikolskoye, Kamchatka Krai on September 5 at a depth of 8.0 km (5.0 mi). The shock had a maximum intensity of V (Moderate).
- A magnitude 6.1 earthquake struck Australia 21 km (13 mi) southwest of Macquarie Island on September 8 at a depth of 10.0 km (6.2 mi). The shock had a maximum intensity of VII (Very strong).
- A magnitude 6.1 earthquake struck Peru 51 km (32 mi) north of Moyobamba, Moyobamba Province on September 10 at a depth of 121.0 km (75.2 mi). The shock had a maximum intensity of IV (Light).
- A magnitude 5.9 earthquake struck Tanzania 27 km (17 mi) east northeast of Nsunga, Kagera Region on September 10 at a depth of 40.0 km (24.9 mi). The shock had a maximum intensity of VI (Strong). Nineteen people were killed and 252 injured in Tanzania as well as four people killed and seven injured in Uganda's Rakai District. Several houses collapsed in the Kangera regional capital of Bukoba and in Uganda.
- A magnitude 5.1 earthquake struck North Macedonia 3 km (1.9 mi) east southeast of Čair Municipality, Skopje on September 11 at a depth of 13.2 km (8.2 mi). The shock had a maximum intensity of VI (Strong). The quake damaged about 300 buildings and more than 100 people were injured while leaving their homes in a panic.
- A magnitude 5.4 earthquake struck South Korea 6 km (3.7 mi) south of Gyeongju, North Gyeongsang Province on September 12 at a depth of 13.0 km (8.1 mi). The shock had a maximum intensity of VII (Very strong). It is the strongest earthquake ever recorded in South Korea. Eight people were injured and 253 properties damaged.
- A magnitude 6.0 earthquake struck Colombia 32 km (20 mi) east northeast of Mutatá, Antioquia on September 14 at a depth of 18.0 km (11.2 mi). The shock had a maximum intensity of VI (Strong).
- A magnitude 6.0 earthquake struck the Solomon Islands 72 km (45 mi) northwest of Malango on September 14 at a depth of 14.0 km (8.7 mi). The shock had a maximum intensity of V (Moderate).
- A magnitude 6.0 earthquake struck offshore of Indonesia 52 km (32 mi) north northwest of Jayapura, Papua on September 17 at a depth of 9.0 km (5.6 mi). The shock had a maximum intensity of IV (Light).
- A magnitude 6.1 earthquake struck offshore of Japan 360 km (220 mi) southeast of Hachijō-jima, Izu Islands on September 20 at a depth of 9.0 km (5.6 mi). The shock had a maximum intensity of III (Weak).
- A magnitude 4.6 earthquake struck Pakistan 12 km (7.5 mi) north of Sann on September 22 at a depth of 10.0 km (6.2 mi). The shock killed one person and left nine others injured in Hyderabad.
- A magnitude 6.2 earthquake struck offshore of Japan 142 km (88 mi) east southeast of Katsuura, Chiba Prefecture on September 23 at a depth of 10.0 km (6.2 mi). The shock had a maximum intensity of IV (Light).
- A magnitude 4.8 earthquake struck Burundi 24 km (15 mi) southeast of Cyangugu, Rwanda, on September 23 at a depth of 10.0 km (6.2 mi). The shock had a maximum intensity of VI (Strong). The quake killed 6 people and injured 5 others in the neighbouring Democratic Republic of the Congo. In Rwanda, this earthquake also killed one person, and injured more than 20 when various houses collapsed in Rusizi district.
- A magnitude 5.6 earthquake struck Romania 7 km (4.3 mi) west northwest of Nereju on September 23 at a depth of 92.0 km (57.2 mi). The shock had a maximum intensity of V (Moderate). Two people were injured.
- A magnitude 6.3 earthquake struck the Philippines 36 km (22 mi) southeast of Tamisan, Davao Oriental, on September 24 at a depth of 65.0 km (40.4 mi). The shock had a maximum intensity of V (Moderate).
- A magnitude 6.4 earthquake struck offshore of Tonga 118 km (73 mi) west northwest of Neiafu on September 24 at a depth of 202.0 km (125.5 mi). The shock had a maximum intensity of IV (Light).
- A magnitude 6.9 earthquake struck Fiji 107 km (66 mi) north northeast of Ndoi Island on September 24 at a depth of 596.4 km (370.6 mi). The shock had a maximum intensity of III (Weak).
- A magnitude 5.5 earthquake struck Nicaragua 20 km (12 mi) north northeast of Nagarote, León department on September 28 at a depth of 7.6 km (4.7 mi). The shock had a maximum intensity of VI (Strong). One person died of a heart attack during this earthquake, five others were injured and some houses collapsed in La Paz Centro.

=== October ===
October
- Strongest: 6.8 M_{w} Papua New Guinea
- Deadliest: 5.4 M_{w} Pakistan; 2 deaths 6.6 M_{w} (Italy) Italy; 2 deaths
- Total fatalities: 7

Number by magnitude
- 8.0–8.9: 0
- 7.0–7.9: 0
- 6.0–6.9: 8
- 5.0–5.9: 98
- 4.0–4.9: 944

- A magnitude 5.4 earthquake struck Pakistan 62 km (39 mi) north northeast of Muzaffarabad on October 1 at a depth of 10.0 km (6.2 mi). The shock had a maximum intensity of VI (Strong). Two people died and thirty others were injured.
- A magnitude 6.3 earthquake struck Papua New Guinea 143 km (89 mi) north of Kimbe, West New Britain on October 15 at a depth of 442.0 km (274.6 mi). The shock had a maximum intensity of III (Weak).
- A magnitude 5.5 earthquake struck Greece 7 km (4.3 mi) west southwest of Asprangeloi, Epirus on October 15 at a depth of 22.0 km (13.7 mi). The shock had a maximum intensity of VI (Strong). The quake damaged some houses and two churches in villages near Ioannina. In Tepelenë, Albania, two houses collapsed and others were damaged.
- A magnitude 5.0 earthquake struck Peru 28 km (17 mi) southwest of Pimentel, Lambayeque Region on October 16 at a depth of 40.7 km (25.3 mi). The shock had a maximum intensity of V (Moderate). One person died in Lambayeque when a floor lamp fell on her.
- A magnitude 6.8 earthquake struck Papua New Guinea 77 km (48 mi) west northwest of Kandrian, West New Britain on October 17 at a depth of 42.0 km (26.1 mi). The shock had a maximum intensity of VI (Strong).
- A magnitude 5.9 earthquake struck China 135 km (84 mi) northeast of Dartang, Tibet Autonomous Region on October 17 at a depth of 35.0 km (21.7 mi). The shock had a maximum intensity of VI (Strong). One person died during this earthquake.
- A magnitude 6.6 earthquake struck Indonesia 161 km (100 mi) north northeast of Pamanukan, West Java on October 19 at a depth of 614.0 km (381.5 mi). The shock had a maximum intensity of III (Weak).
- A magnitude 4.8 earthquake struck Iran 5 km (3.1 mi) southwest of Zarand, Kerman on October 20 at a depth of 10.0 km (6.2 mi). The shock had a maximum intensity of II (Weak). Twenty-four people were injured and some buildings suffered damage in Zarand.
- A magnitude 6.2 earthquake struck Japan 6 km (3.7 mi) south of Kurayoshi, Tottori Prefecture on October 21 at a depth of 5.6 km (3.5 mi). The shock had a maximum intensity of VII (Very strong). At least 20 people were injured and some damage was caused.
- A magnitude 4.7 earthquake struck Rwanda 18 km (11 mi) southeast of Cyangugu on October 24 at a depth of 10.0 km (6.2 mi). The shock had a maximum intensity of V (Moderate). In the country's Western Province, at least three houses were destroyed and several others suffered damage. In the city of Bukavu, in the neighboring Democratic Republic of the Congo, two buildings were destroyed and others were damaged.
- A magnitude 6.1 earthquake struck offshore of Tonga 127 km (79 mi) west northwest of Hihifo on October 26 at a depth of 10.0 km (6.2 mi). The shock had a maximum intensity of IV (Light).
- A magnitude 5.5 earthquake struck Italy 2 km (1.2 mi) south southeast of Preci on October 26 at a depth of 6.0 km (3.7 mi). The shock had a maximum intensity of VII (Very strong). Several buildings collapsed. Two people were injured. This was a foreshock of the 6.6 quake.
- A magnitude 6.1 earthquake struck Italy 2 km (1.2 mi) north northwest of Visso on October 26 at a depth of 10.0 km (6.2 mi). The shock had a maximum intensity of VII (Very strong). One person died of a heart attack during this earthquake and 8 others were injured when various houses collapsed in the region of Marche. This was a foreshock of the 6.6 quake.
- A magnitude 6.0 earthquake struck offshore of Chile 88 km (55 mi) west southwest of San Antonio on October 27 at a depth of 12.6 km (7.8 mi). The shock had a maximum intensity of IV (Light).
- A magnitude 4.8 earthquake struck offshore of Peru 13 km (8.1 mi) west northwest of Urb. Santo Domingo on October 28 at a depth of 67.4 km (41.9 mi). The shock had a maximum intensity of IV (Light). One person was injured and 15 houses were damaged by a rockslide in San Juan de Lurigancho.
- A magnitude 4.8 earthquake struck Iran 21 km (13 mi) southwest of Zarand on October 28 at a depth of 17.7 km (11.0 mi). Ten people were injured and numerous houses were damaged or destroyed in the Zarand area.
- A magnitude 6.6 earthquake struck Italy 5 km (3.1 mi) east southeast of Preci on October 30 at a depth of 8.0 km (5.0 mi). The shock had a maximum intensity of VIII (Severe). The villages of Arquata del Tronto, Visso, Castelsantangelo sul Nera, Ussita, as well as the Basilica of Saint Benedict in Norcia, were destroyed. Two people died of heart attacks during this earthquake and 20 others were injured.
- A magnitude 5.6 earthquake struck Colombia 34 km (21 mi) east northeast of the town of Colombia on October 31 at a depth of 33.0 km (20.5 mi). The shock had a maximum intensity of VI (Strong). At least 40 homes collapsed, 56 others were damaged and two landslides blocked roads in the Colombia area. The widespread damage caused by the earthquake led to a declaration of public disaster by the Colombian government in northern Huila.

=== November ===
November
- Strongest: 7.8 M_{w} New Zealand
- Deadliest: 4.4 M_{w} Poland; 8 deaths
- Total fatalities: 13

Number by magnitude
- 8.0–8.9: 0
- 7.0–7.9: 1
- 6.0–6.9: 12
- 5.0–5.9: 159
- 4.0–4.9: 1,267

- A magnitude 6.0 earthquake struck Papua New Guinea 99 km (62 mi) west of Kandrian, West New Britain on November 1 at a depth of 52.0 km (32.3 mi). The shock had a maximum intensity of IV (Light).
- A magnitude 6.3 earthquake struck Chile 15 km (9.3 mi) south of Curicó on November 4 at a depth of 90.0 km (55.9 mi). The shock had a maximum intensity of VI (Strong).
- A magnitude 4.2 earthquake struck Indonesia 15 km (9.3 mi) east of Banjaran on November 5 at a depth of 10.0 km (6.2 mi). The shock had a maximum intensity of III (Weak) One person was injured and six homes and two buildings were damaged in the Pangalengan area.
- A magnitude 5.0 earthquake struck the United States 3 km (1.9 mi) west of Cushing, Oklahoma on November 7 at a depth of 4.4 km (2.7 mi). The shock had a maximum intensity of VII (Very strong). Multiple buildings were damaged and minor injuries were reported.
- A magnitude 6.0 earthquake struck offshore of Chile 42 km (26 mi) west northwest of Talcahuano on November 8 at a depth of 20.0 km (12.4 mi). The shock had a maximum intensity of VI (Strong).
- A magnitude 6.1 earthquake struck Japan 24 km (15 mi) east northeast of Ishinomaki, Miyagi Prefecture on November 11 at a depth of 42.4 km (26.3 mi). The shock had a maximum intensity of V (Moderate).
- A magnitude 7.8 earthquake struck New Zealand 53 km (33 mi) north northeast of Amberley on November 13 at a depth of 15.1 km (9.4 mi). The shock had a maximum intensity of IX (Violent). Ruptures occurred on multiple fault lines in a complex sequence that lasted for about two minutes with the largest amount of energy released far to the north of the epicentre. Two people were killed, and widespread damage was reported across parts of the South Island. A tsunami was also observed, reaching 2.5 m (8 ft 2 in) at Kaikōura.
- A magnitude 6.5 earthquake struck New Zealand 92 km (57 mi) south southwest of Blenheim on November 13 at a depth of 10.0 km (6.2 mi). The shock had a maximum intensity of VII (Very strong). This was an aftershock of the 7.8 quake.
- A magnitude 6.1 earthquake struck New Zealand 78 km (48 mi) south southwest of Blenheim on November 13 at a depth of 14.0 km (8.7 mi). The shock had a maximum intensity of VI (Strong). This was an aftershock of the 7.8 quake.
- A magnitude 6.2 earthquake struck New Zealand 90 km (56 mi) south southwest of Blenheim on November 13 at a depth of 2.1 km (1.3 mi). The shock had a maximum intensity of VII (Very strong). This was an aftershock of the 7.8 quake.
- A magnitude 6.5 earthquake struck New Zealand 74 km (46 mi) northeast of Amberley on November 14 at a depth of 9.0 km (5.6 mi). The shock had a maximum intensity of VII (Very strong). This was an aftershock of the 7.8 quake.
- A magnitude 5.7 earthquake struck Indonesia 80 km (50 mi) south of Kencong on November 15 at a depth of 85.0 km (52.8 mi). The shock had a maximum intensity of V (Moderate) Four homes collapsed and 33 others damaged in the Malang area.
- A magnitude 5.0 earthquake struck China 198 km (123 mi) north northwest of Qamdo on November 17 at a depth of 10.0 km (6.2 mi). Four people injured, 18 houses collapsed and 421 others damaged in Nangqian County.
- A magnitude 6.4 earthquake struck Argentina 7 km (4.3 mi) north northwest of Pocito on November 20 at a depth of 108.0 km (67.1 mi). The shock had a maximum intensity of VI (Strong). The quake, the strongest to affect the region in recent years, damaged various houses in San Juan province.
- A magnitude 6.9 earthquake struck offshore of Japan 35 km (22 mi) east southeast of Namie, Fukushima Prefecture on November 22 at a depth of 9.0 km (5.6 mi). The shock had a maximum intensity of VI (Strong). 14 people were injured and more than 1,900 homes briefly lost electricity. A 60 cm (24 in) tsunami wave was reported in the port of Onahama of Iwaki, Fukushima; a 90 cm (35 in) wave hit Soma, Fukushima; and another wave 1 m (3 ft 3 in) in height struck the Fukushima Daiichi Nuclear Power Plant site after the 6.9 shock. Chief Cabinet Secretary Yoshihide Suga said that the spent fuel cooling system of the third reactor at the neighboring Fukushima Daini Nuclear Power Plant had stopped as a result of the earthquake; TEPCO later reported the restart of the spent fuel cooling system after only 100 minutes of stoppage.
- A magnitude 6.9 earthquake struck offshore of El Salvador 156 km (97 mi) south southwest of Puerto El Triunfo on November 24 at a depth of 10.0 km (6.2 mi). The shock had a maximum intensity of IV (Light). One person died of a heart attack due to shock and fear after hearing a tsunami warning alert.
- A magnitude 6.6 earthquake struck the Xinjiang Autonomous Region of China 122 km (76 mi) north of Murghob, Tajikistan on November 25 at a depth of 17.0 km (10.6 mi). The shock had a maximum intensity of VII (Very strong). One person died when various houses near the epicenter collapsed, and livestock were killed.
- A magnitude 5.4 earthquake struck Nepal 17 km (11 mi) west of Namche Bazar on November 27 at a depth of 10.0 km (6.2 mi). The shock had a maximum intensity of VI (Strong). This quake triggered an avalanche that killed one person and left another injured.
- A magnitude 4.2 earthquake struck Poland 1 km (0.62 mi) north northwest of Grębocice on November 29 at a depth of 5.0 km (3.1 mi). The shock had a maximum intensity of V (Moderate). This earthquake caused a mine collapse in Rudna, near the epicenter. Eight miners were killed and five others injured.

=== December ===
December
- Strongest: 7.9 M_{w} Papua New Guinea
- Deadliest: 6.5 M_{w} (Indonesia) Indonesia; 104 deaths
- Total fatalities: 111

Number by magnitude
- 8.0–8.9: 0
- 7.0–7.9: 3
- 6.0–6.9: 17
- 5.0–5.9: 200
- 4.0–4.9: 754

- A magnitude 5.3 earthquake struck Costa Rica 9 km (5.6 mi) northeast of Cartago on December 1 at a depth of 1.3 km (0.81 mi). The shock had a maximum intensity of VI (Strong). The earthquake caused landslides and damaged some homes, forcing at least 5 families to move to a community centre.
- A magnitude 4.7 earthquake struck Iran 50 km (31 mi) east of Kerman on December 1 at a depth of 10.0 km (6.2 mi). An elderly woman was injured and homes and buildings were damaged the Shahdad area.
- A magnitude 6.2 earthquake struck Peru 22 km (14 mi) southwest of Vilavila, Puno Region on December 1 at a depth of 12.0 km (7.5 mi). The shock had a maximum intensity of VI (Strong). At least 40 houses in Lampa Province were damaged, with some suffering total collapse. One person died and 17 others were injured.
- A magnitude 4.7 earthquake struck Nicaragua 16 km (9.9 mi) east southeast of Puerto Morazán on December 3 at a depth of 12.2 km (7.6 mi). The shock had a maximum intensity of II (Weak). One person died of a heart attack in the El Viejo area.
- A magnitude 6.3 earthquake struck Indonesia 193 km (120 mi) northeast of Maumere, East Nusa Tenggara on December 5 at a depth of 526.0 km (326.8 mi). The shock had a maximum intensity of II (Weak).
- A magnitude 6.5 earthquake struck Indonesia 14 km (8.7 mi) west northwest of Meureudu, Aceh on December 6 at a depth of 13.0 km (8.1 mi). The shock had a maximum intensity of VIII (Severe). About 245 buildings collapsed as a result of the quake. 104 people were killed and over 900 were injured, of which 136 suffered serious injuries.
- A magnitude 6.0 earthquake struck China 58 km (36 mi) south southeast of Shihezi in the Xinjiang Autonomous Region on December 8 at a depth of 17.6 km (10.9 mi). The shock had a maximum intensity of VII (Very strong). Two people were injured, and 25 houses suffered damage in Ürümqi region.
- A magnitude 6.6 earthquake struck offshore of the United States 164 km (102 mi) west of Ferndale, California on December 8 at a depth of 8.4 km (5.2 mi). The shock had a maximum intensity of IV (Light).
- A magnitude 7.8 earthquake struck the Solomon Islands 69 km (43 mi) west southwest of Kirakira on December 8 at a depth of 40.0 km (24.9 mi). The shock had a maximum intensity of VIII (Severe). Tsunami waves up to 5.0 cm (2.0 in) were measured in New Caledonia and Vanuatu. More than 200 buildings in the southern part of Malaita were damaged and buildings collapsed in Makira; more than 7,000 people were affected by the quake. An eleven-year-old girl died when a building collapsed.
- A magnitude 6.5 earthquake struck the Solomon Islands 79 km (49 mi) west southwest of Kirakira on December 8 at a depth of 12.3 km (7.6 mi). The shock had a maximum intensity of V (Moderate). This was an aftershock of the 7.8 quake.
- A magnitude 4.4 earthquake struck Croatia 0 km (0 mi) south of Okrug Gornji, Split-Dalmatia county on December 9 at a depth of 22.5 km (14.0 mi). The shock had a maximum intensity of VI (Strong). The quake caused minor damage in the form of cracked walls and broken windows.
- A magnitude 6.9 earthquake struck offshore of the Solomon Islands 92 km (57 mi) west southwest of Kirakira on December 9 at a depth of 19.7 km (12.2 mi). The shock had a maximum intensity of VI (Strong). This was an aftershock of the 7.8 quake.
- A magnitude 6.0 earthquake struck Papua New Guinea 133 km (83 mi) west northwest of Panguna, Bougainville on December 10 at a depth of 142.6 km (88.6 mi). The shock had a maximum intensity of IV (Light).
- A magnitude 6.0 earthquake struck offshore of the United States trust territory of the Northern Mariana Islands 97 km (60 mi) north northwest of Farallon de Pajaros on December 14 at a depth of 22.4 km (13.9 mi). The shock had a maximum intensity of IV (Light).
- A magnitude 7.9 earthquake struck Papua New Guinea 140 km (87 mi) east of Kokopo, East New Britain on December 17 at a depth of 94.5 km (58.7 mi). The shock had a maximum intensity of VII (Very strong). Although tsunami waves up to 8.0 cm (3.1 in) were measured and power was knocked out in some parts of the country, no reports of injuries or damage were reported.
- A magnitude 6.3 earthquake struck offshore of Papua New Guinea 178 km (111 mi) west northwest of Panguna, Bougainville on December 17 at a depth of 8.4 km (5.2 mi). The shock had a maximum intensity of IV (Light). This was an aftershock of the 7.9 quake.
- A magnitude 6.2 earthquake struck the Federated States of Micronesia 135 km (84 mi) south southwest of Colonia on December 18 at a depth of 19.0 km (11.8 mi). The shock had a maximum intensity of V (Moderate).
- A magnitude 6.4 earthquake struck Peru's Ucayali Region 186 km (116 mi) northwest of Iñapari, Madre de Dios Region on December 18 at a depth of 612.0 km (380.3 mi). The shock had a maximum intensity of II (Weak).
- A magnitude 5.4 earthquake struck Ecuador 11 km (6.8 mi) south southwest of Esmeraldas, Esmeraldas Province on December 19 at a depth of 10.0 km (6.2 mi). The shock had a maximum intensity of VII (Very strong). This earthquake damaged houses, hotels, and caused some landslides in Atacames. Three people died and 47 others were injured.
- A magnitude 6.4 earthquake struck the Solomon Islands 81 km (50 mi) west northwest of Kirakira on December 20 at a depth of 20.0 km (12.4 mi). The shock had a maximum intensity of VI (Strong). This was an aftershock of the 7.8 quake.
- A magnitude 6.0 earthquake struck the Solomon Islands 114 km (71 mi) west northwest of Kirakira on December 20 at a depth of 10.0 km (6.2 mi). The shock had a maximum intensity of V (Moderate). This was an aftershock of the 7.8 quake.
- A magnitude 6.7 earthquake struck offshore of Indonesia 151 km (94 mi) east northeast of Lospalos, East Timor on December 21 at a depth of 152.0 km (94.4 mi). The shock had a maximum intensity of V (Moderate).
- A magnitude 6.0 earthquake struck Papua New Guinea 175 km (109 mi) southeast of Kokopo, East New Britain on December 10 at a depth of 35.0 km (21.7 mi). The shock had a maximum intensity of IV (Light).
- A magnitude 7.6 earthquake struck Chile's Chiloé Island 41 km (25 mi) southwest of Quellón on December 25 at a depth of 38.0 km (23.6 mi). The shock had a maximum intensity of VIII (Severe). The quake ripped up a road near Lake Tarahuin. 4,000 people were evacuated in the Los Lagos area after a tsunami warning, but this alert was lifted one hour later.
- A magnitude 4.9 earthquake struck Iran 35 km (22 mi) southeast of Kalaleh, Golestan province on December 27 at a depth of 30.5 km (19.0 mi). More than 1,500 buildings were damaged in the Nardin area.
- A magnitude 5.6 earthquake struck Romania 13 km (8.1 mi) west of Nereju Mic, Vrancea on December 27 at a depth of 97.0 km (60.3 mi). The shock had a maximum intensity of V (Moderate). The quake caused minor damage to façades of some buildings, especially in Bucharest.
- A magnitude 5.9 earthquake struck Japan 13 km (8.1 mi) northeast of Daigo, Ibaraki Prefecture on December 28 at a depth of 7.0 km (4.3 mi). The shock had a maximum intensity of VII (Very strong). Two people were injured during this earthquake.
- A magnitude 6.3 earthquake struck Indonesia 58 km (36 mi) south southeast of Dompu, West Nusa Tenggara on December 29 at a depth of 79.0 km (49.1 mi). The shock had a maximum intensity of V (Moderate). One person died of a fall in Bima and several houses damaged in the Dompu area.

== See also ==
- List of 20th-century earthquakes
- List of historical earthquakes
- Lists of earthquakes
