= Dianjiang railway station =

Railway station in Dianjiang County, Chongqing

Dianjiang 垫江

General information
- Location: Dianjiang County, Chongqing; China
- Coordinates: 30°18′35.69″N 107°22′25.32″E
- Line: Chongqing–Wanzhou intercity railway

History
- Opened: 28 November 2016
Location

Dianjiang railway station (Chinese: 垫江站) is a railway station in Dianjiang County, Chongqing, China. It is an intermediate stop on the Chongqing–Wanzhou intercity railway. It opened with the line on 28 November 2016.

| Preceding station | China Railway High-speed | Following station |
|---|---|---|
| Changshou North towards Chongqing North | Chongqing–Wanzhou intercity railway | Liangping South towards Wanzhou North |
