= Liangping, Chongqing =

Liangping 梁平区
- District
- Liangping in Chongqing
- Interactive map of Liangping
- Location of the seat in Liangping
- Coordinates (Liangping District government): 30°39′14″N 107°46′12″E
- Country: People's Republic of China
- Municipality: Chongqing

Area
  - Total: 1,890 km^{2} (730 sq mi)

Population (2006)
  - Total: 880,000
  - Density: 470/km^{2} (1,200/sq mi)
- Time zone: UTC+8 (China Standard)

Liangping District (Chinese: 梁平区; pinyin: Liángpíng Qū), formerly Liangping County (Chinese: 梁平县) and Liangshan County (Chinese: 梁山县), is a district in the north of Chongqing Municipality, People's Republic of China.

== Sports ==
The Liangping District National Fitness Centre Stadium, which has a capacity of 20,937, is the largest venue by capacity in Liangping. It opened in 2017.

== Administrative divisions ==
Name	Chinese (S)	Hanyu Pinyin	Population (2010)	Area (km^{2})
Liangshan Subdistrict	梁山街道	Liángshān Jiēdào	100,581	83.49
Shuanggui Subdistrict	双桂街道	Shuāngguì Jiēdào	34,340	58
Renxian Subdistrict	仁贤街道	Rénxián Jiēdào	21,499	49
Jindai Subdistrict	金带街道	Jīndài Jiēdào	11,644	50
Hexing Subdistrict	合兴街道	Héxìng Jiēdào	17,098	51.4
Lirang town	礼让镇	Lǐràng Zhèn	19,799	45
Yunlong town	云龙镇	Yúnlóng Zhèn	29,673	78.4
Pingjin town	屏锦镇	Píngjǐn Zhèn	55,139	102.11
Yuanyi town	袁驿镇	Yuányì Zhèn	19,804	42.6
Xinsheng town	新盛镇	Xīnshèng Zhèn	27,741	65.6
Fulu town	福禄镇	Fúlù Zhèn	20,225	87.5
Jukui town	聚奎镇	Jùkuí Zhèn	32,971	57
Mingda town	明达镇	Míngdá Zhèn	22,686	58.9
Yinping town	荫平镇	Yīnpíng Zhèn	18,574	54
Helin town	和林镇	Hé lín Zhèn	19,268	58
Huilong town	回龙镇	Huílóng Zhèn	32,070	89.5
Bishan town	碧山镇	Bìshān Zhèn	18,102	38.7
Hucheng town	虎城镇	Hǔchéng Zhèn	24,453	78
Qixing town	七星镇	Qīxīng Zhèn	7,804	35
Longmen town	龙门镇	Lóngmén Zhèn	19,380	53
Wenhua town	文化镇	Wénhuà Zhèn	12,435	29.5
Shi'an town	石安镇	Shí'ān Zhèn	10,857	60.5
Baijia town	柏家镇	Bǎijiā Zhèn	14,163	69.5
Daguan town	大观镇	Dàguān Zhèn	10,767	63.2
Zhushan town	竹山镇	Zhúshān Zhèn	5,648	42
Panlong town	蟠龙镇	Pánlóng Zhèn	18,609	96.27
Xingqiao town	星桥镇	Xīngqiáo Zhèn		53.1
Qushui town	曲水镇	Qūshuǐ Zhèn	10,359	47.43
Ansheng Town Town	安胜镇	Ānshèng Zhèn	8,675	33.7
Fuping Town Town	复平镇	Fùpíng Zhèn	5,577	31.33
Zizhao Town Town	紫照镇	Zǐzhào Zhèn	8,791	36
Tiemen Township	铁门乡	Tiěmén Xiāng	5,212	30.66
Longsheng Township	龙胜乡	Lóngshèng Xiāng	6,576	36

== Climate ==
Liangping has a monsoon-influenced humid subtropical climate (Köppen Cwa), with four distinct seasons and ample rainfall: winters are short, mild, and comparatively dry, while summers are long, hot, and humid. Monthly daily average temperatures range from 5.7 °C (42.3 °F) in January to around 27.0 °C (80.6 °F) in July and August, with August being slightly warmer. The diurnal temperature variation is 7.15 °C (12.9 °F) and is especially small during winter. Around 71% of the annual precipitation falls from May to September.

Climate data for Liangping, elevation 455 m (1,493 ft), (1991–2020 normals, extremes 1981–present)
Month	Jan	Feb	Mar	Apr	May	Jun	Jul	Aug	Sep	Oct	Nov	Dec	Year
Record high °C (°F)	18.8 (65.8)	22.7 (72.9)	33.5 (92.3)	34.3 (93.7)	36.6 (97.9)	37.0 (98.6)	41.9 (107.4)	42.0 (107.6)	38.7 (101.7)	32.9 (91.2)	27.7 (81.9)	18.2 (64.8)	42.0 (107.6)
Mean daily maximum °C (°F)	9.0 (48.2)	12.0 (53.6)	17.0 (62.6)	22.6 (72.7)	26.1 (79.0)	28.9 (84.0)	32.4 (90.3)	32.7 (90.9)	27.6 (81.7)	21.4 (70.5)	16.3 (61.3)	10.4 (50.7)	21.4 (70.5)
Daily mean °C (°F)	5.9 (42.6)	8.2 (46.8)	12.3 (54.1)	17.5 (63.5)	21.2 (70.2)	24.1 (75.4)	27.3 (81.1)	27.0 (80.6)	22.8 (73.0)	17.4 (63.3)	12.6 (54.7)	7.3 (45.1)	17.0 (62.5)
Mean daily minimum °C (°F)	3.5 (38.3)	5.4 (41.7)	8.9 (48.0)	13.6 (56.5)	17.5 (63.5)	20.6 (69.1)	23.3 (73.9)	22.8 (73.0)	19.5 (67.1)	14.8 (58.6)	10.0 (50.0)	5.0 (41.0)	13.7 (56.7)
Record low °C (°F)	−6.6 (20.1)	−2.4 (27.7)	−0.8 (30.6)	2.3 (36.1)	10.0 (50.0)	13.8 (56.8)	16.4 (61.5)	16.8 (62.2)	12.6 (54.7)	3.5 (38.3)	0.3 (32.5)	−4.4 (24.1)	−6.6 (20.1)
Average precipitation mm (inches)	18.5 (0.73)	20.0 (0.79)	57.2 (2.25)	101.4 (3.99)	171.6 (6.76)	188.6 (7.43)	167.0 (6.57)	151.1 (5.95)	151.0 (5.94)	117.4 (4.62)	56.4 (2.22)	22.2 (0.87)	1,222.4 (48.12)
Average precipitation days (≥ 0.1 mm)	9.3	8.5	11.3	13.5	15.8	15.0	12.1	11.1	12.4	14.7	11.2	9.8	144.7
Average snowy days	1.3	0.5	0	0	0	0	0	0	0	0	0	0.5	2.3
Average relative humidity (%)	84	80	77	77	78	81	78	75	80	85	85	86	81
Mean monthly sunshine hours	40.2	45.7	88.3	125.4	127.3	127.6	196.1	205.6	126.1	82.0	66.4	39.8	1,270.5
Percentage possible sunshine	12	15	24	32	30	30	46	51	34	23	21	13	28
Source 1: China Meteorological Administrationall-time extreme temperatureall-time July high
Source 2: Weather China

== Transport ==
China National Highway 318 passes through Liangping. Liangping is served by Liangping railway station on the Dazhou-Wanzhou railway and Liangping South railway station on the Chongqing–Wanzhou intercity railway.
