= Liangping South railway station =

Railway station in Liangping District, Chongqing

Liangping South 梁平南

General information
- Location: Liangping District, Chongqing; China
- Coordinates: 30°38′38.88″N 107°45′55.69″E
- Line: Chongqing–Wanzhou intercity railway

History
- Opened: 28 November 2016
Location

Liangping South railway station (Chinese: 梁平南站) is a railway station in Liangping District, Chongqing, China. It is an intermediate stop on the Chongqing–Wanzhou intercity railway. It opened with the line on 28 November 2016.

In March 2021, the service level was reduced from 35 to 23 trains per day. However, from October 2021, the number of daily services was increased from 23 to 30.

== See also ==
- Liangping railway station

| Preceding station | China Railway High-speed | Following station |
|---|---|---|
| Dianjiang towards Chongqing North | Chongqing–Wanzhou intercity railway | Wanzhou North Terminus |
