= 2016 Te Araroa earthquake =

Earthquake in New Zealand

- Location within New Zealand
- UTC time: 2016-09-01 16:37:57
- ISC event: 611830479
- USGS-ANSS: ComCat
- Local date: 2 September 2016
- Local time: 4:37:55 am NZST
- Magnitude: 7.1 M_{w}
- Depth: 22 km (14 mi)
- Epicentre: 36.98°S 179.52°E
- Type: Oblique-slip
- Areas affected: New Zealand
- Max. intensity: MMI VI (Strong)
- Tsunami: 30 cm at East Cape and Great Barrier Island

The 2016 Te Araroa earthquake was an earthquake measuring 7.1 on the moment magnitude scale that occurred at 04:37:55 NZST on 2 September 2016 (16:37:55 UTC 1 September). The epicentre was located 125 km (78 mi) north-east of Te Araroa off the East Cape of the North Island of New Zealand with a focal depth of 22 km (14 mi). The earthquake was widely felt throughout the North Island and in the upper South Island. There were no reported casualties, and buildings predominantly suffered only a little bit of damage.

== Earthquake ==
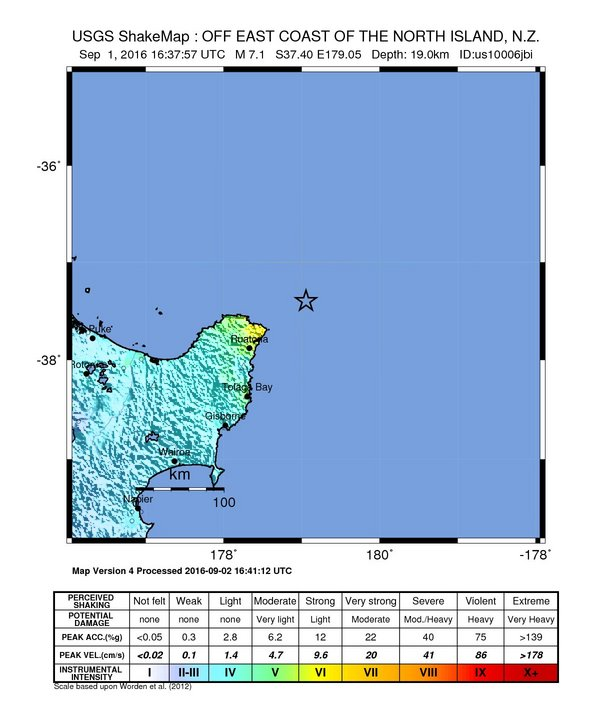
USGS ShakeMap

=== Foreshock ===
A magnitude 5.7 earthquake was recorded at 10:04:35 NZST on 1 September 2016, one day prior to the main earthquake.

Date	Local time (NZST)	Magnitude	Hypocenter depth	Epicentre		
Date	Local time (NZST)	Magnitude	Hypocenter depth	Location	Latitude	Longitude
1 September 2016	10:04:35	5.7	26 km (16 mi)	100 km north-east of Te Araroa	−37.06	179.21

=== Aftershocks ===
A series of aftershocks followed the earthquake, the largest being a magnitude 6.2 earthquake which occurred at 05:15:05 NZST on 2 September. Dozens of smaller aftershocks were also recorded, with 18 measuring magnitude 5.0 or greater as of 4 November 2016. GeoNet forecast the probability of one or more additional aftershocks measuring between 6.0 and 6.9 as 32% for the month to 12 October while the probability of an earthquake greater than or equal to 7.0 was 4% for the same period.

Aftershocks of magnitude ≥ 5.0
Date	Local time (NZST)	Magnitude	Hypocenter depth	Epicentre		
Date	Local time (NZST)	Magnitude	Hypocenter depth	Location	Latitude	Longitude
2 September 2016	04:37:55	7.1	22 km (14 mi)	125 km north-east of Te Araroa	-36.98	179.52
2 September 2016	04:48:05	5.2	17 km (11 mi)	85 km north-east of Te Araroa	−37.00	178.93
2 September 2016	05:01:09	5.7	19 km (12 mi)	95 km north-east of Te Araroa	−37.00	179.14
2 September 2016	05:14:05	6.2	20 km (12 mi)	110 km north-east of Te Araroa	−36.91	179.21
2 September 2016	05:34:27	5.1	26 km (16 mi)	95 km north-east of Te Araroa	−37.13	179.23
2 September 2016	05:36:03	5.7	58 km (36 mi)	90 km north-east of Te Araroa	−37.09	179.15
2 September 2016	07:18:28	5.8	18 km (11 mi)	90 km north-east of Te Araroa	−37.05	179.10
2 September 2016	08:06:03	6.0	18 km (11 mi)	125 km east of Te Araroa	−37.14	179.66
3 September 2016	16:30:10	5.5	12 km (7.5 mi)	70 km east of Te Araroa	−37.36	179.11
3 September 2016	16:58:36	5.2	114 km (71 mi)	70 km north-east of Te Araroa	−37.26	178.99
4 September 2016	01:30:26	5.5	18 km (11 mi)	65 km east of Te Araroa	−37.39	179.02
4 September 2016	18:19:42	5.0	32 km (20 mi)	95 km north-east of Te Araroa	−37.12	179.25
5 September 2016	08:00:28	5.1	17 km (11 mi)	55 km east of Te Araroa	−37.41	178.96
6 September 2016	03:19:01	5.7	21 km (13 mi)	95 km north-east of Te Araroa	−37.00	179.06
6 September 2016	05:01:58	5.3	19 km (12 mi)	95 km north-east of Te Araroa	−37.00	179.08
15 September 2016	04:09:29	5.0	20 km (12 mi)	80 km north-east of Te Araroa	−37.13	179.04
23 September 2016	17:56:27	5.1	22 km (14 mi)	65 km east of Te Araroa	−37.42	179.06
9 October 2016	08:41:16	5.8	7 km (4.3 mi)	75 km north-east of Te Araroa	−37.08	178.89
4 November 2016	07:45:47	5.0	95 km (59 mi)	260 km north-east of Te Araroa	−35.98	−179.58
14 November 2016	04:42:45	5.1	10 km (6.2 mi)	120 km north-east of Te Araroa	−36.83	179.25
27 November 2016	13:18:39	5.1	61 km (38 mi)	105 km north-east of Te Araroa	−37.08	179.31

== Aftermath ==
Following the earthquake, the Ministry of Civil Defence & Emergency Management (MCDEM) issued a tsunami warning for parts of the north and east coasts of the North Island. Waves measuring 30 cm in height were recorded by tide gauges at East Cape and Great Barrier Island, and although the warning was later cancelled advisories remained in place for strong currents and abnormal sea level fluctuations.

Power outages temporarily affected 300 homes near Rototahi and Waimata north of Gisborne while KiwiRail issued a precautionary shutdown notice for part of the rail network in Auckland.

While no injuries or significant damage occurred, a spokesperson for the Earthquake Commission said they had received 48 claims for damage compensation by 4:30 pm local time on the day of the earthquake. Damage was localised to coastal towns near the epicentre of the earthquake, including in Te Puia Springs where Puketiti Homestead and Stable, a Category 1 historic building, suffered damage to a chimney and fireplace.

== See also ==
- List of earthquakes in 2016
- List of earthquakes in New Zealand
