= 2016 Old Iliamna earthquake =

Earthquake in Alaska

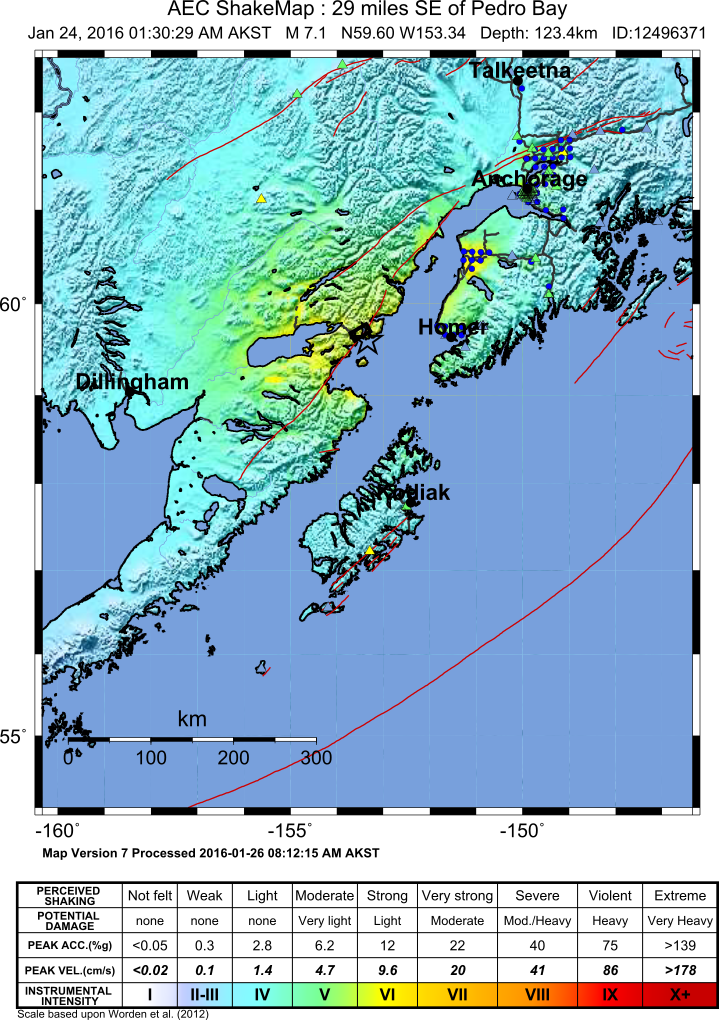

- Location within Alaska
- UTC time: 2016-01-24 10:30:30
- ISC event: 612141445
- USGS-ANSS: ComCat
- Local date: January 24, 2016
- Local time: 01:30 Alaska Standard Time (UTC-9)
- Magnitude: 7.1 M_{w}
- Epicenter: 59.605°N 153.340°W
- Type: Oblique-slip
- Areas affected: Alaska; United States
- Total damage: 4 homes destroyed 1 highway heavily damaged Damage to gas, water and electrical infrastructure Other property damage
- Max. intensity: MMI VI (Strong)
- Tsunami: No
- Aftershocks: 4.7, 4.3, 4.0 and 3.2
- Casualties: 1 injury

The 2016 Old Iliamna earthquake struck in the Cook Inlet region of Alaska near Iliamna at 1:30 AM AKST on January 24, 2016. The quake was centered approximately 162 miles (261 km) from Anchorage, and 65 miles (105 km) from Homer. The earthquake registered 7.1, and was felt across a wide area of Southcentral Alaska, the Kenai Peninsula and as far away as Juneau roughly 700 miles (1,100 km) southeast of the epicenter. Moderate to heavy damage to homes, roads and businesses was experienced over a wide area.

== Damage ==
Damage, mostly moderate with pockets of heavier damage, was experienced across a wide area of Southcentral Alaska. On the Kenai Peninsula, four homes were destroyed in Kenai due to gas leak related fires. Businesses had damage to merchandise, and the Kalifornsky Beach Road was heavily damaged. There were also power outages in Homer, as well as moderate property damage. There was a voluntary evacuation of the Homer Spit.

In Anchorage, there were power outages reported in several areas, affecting over 5,000 customers. There were also numerous gas leaks and water line breaks. There was damage reported across the city to residents' personal effects in homes, as well as to business merchandise. Rows of shelving at a True Value hardware store collapsed, damaging the merchandise. A bridge connecting downtown Anchorage with the Government Hill neighborhood was evacuated and closed after cracks were discovered on the span. The downtown Brady Building had broken windows and other damage to the offices there.

There was varying degrees of damage to Anchorage School District buildings, including to a library shared by West Anchorage High School and Romig Middle School. There was also damage to the Student Union at the University of Alaska Anchorage.

== See also ==
- List of earthquakes in 2016
- List of earthquakes in Alaska
