= Shuanggui Subdistrict =

Shuanggui Subdistrict 双桂街道
- Subdistrict
- Location in Chongqing
- Coordinates: 30.6587°N 107.7764°E
- Country: People's Republic of China
- Direct-Administered Municipality: Chongqing
- District: Liangping District
- Time zone: UTC+8 (China Standard)

Shuanggui Subdistrict (Chinese: 双桂街道; pinyin: Shuāngguì Jiēdào) is a subdistrict in Liangping District, Chongqing, China. As of 2020, it administers the following seven residential neighborhoods and ten villages:

Neighborhoods

- Daheba Community (大河坝社区)
- Taihe Community (太和社区)
- Zhenglong Community (正龙社区)
- Zhangqiao Community (张桥社区)
- Xinmin Community (新民社区)
- Huixing Community (回兴社区)
- Zaojiao Community (皂角社区)

Villages

- Songzhu Village (松竹村)
- Xinglong Village (兴隆村)
- Anning Village (安宁村)
- Xiangshui Village (响水村)
- Niutou Village (牛头村)
- Qianming Village (千明村)
- Huangni Village (黄泥村)
- Liangshui Village (凉水村)
- Anfu Village (安复村)
- Yanhe Village (盐河村)

== See also ==
- List of township-level divisions of Chongqing
