= 2016 Chiloé earthquake =

Earthquake in Chile

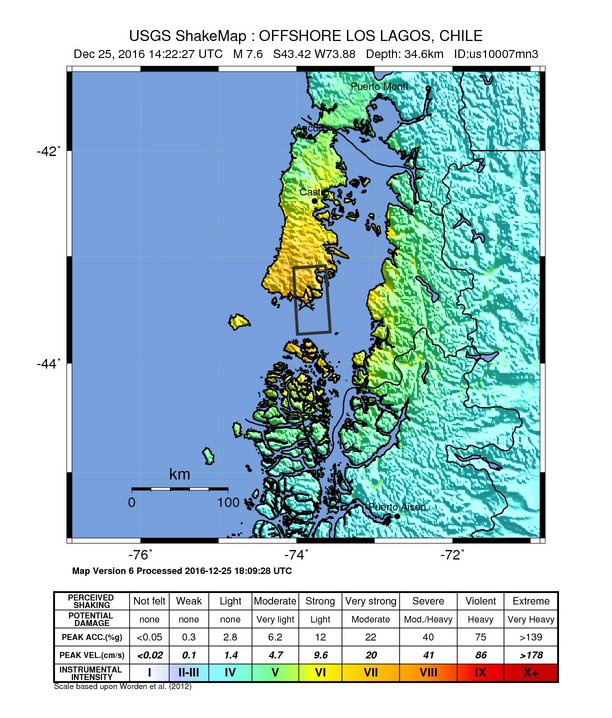
- ShakeMap of the earthquake
- UTC time: 2016-12-25 14:22:27
- ISC event: 609939179
- USGS-ANSS: ComCat
- Local date: December 25, 2016
- Local time: 11:22 UTC-3
- Magnitude: 7.6 M_{w}
- Depth: 34.6 km (USGS)
- Epicenter: 43.406°S 73.941°W
- Type: Thrust fault
- Max. intensity: MMI VIII (Severe)
- Tsunami: 0.44m (1.4ft)
- Aftershocks: > 30
- Casualties: None

The 2016 Chiloé earthquake with a magnitude of M_{ww} 7.6 struck 225 kilometres (140 mi) south-west of Puerto Montt in southern Chile at 11:22 local time, 25 December. The earthquake triggered a tsunami warning on coasts located up to 1,000 kilometres (620 mi) from the quake's epicentre, generating massive evacuation across the Greater Chiloé Island, after advice from the Chilean government. Although there was damage in some parts of the island, the government reported no casualties.

== Earthquake ==
The earthquake occurred as a result of shallow thrust faulting in southern Chile. At the location of the earthquake, the oceanic Nazca plate converges with and subducts beneath the South America plate in an east-northeast direction, at a rate of approximately 73 mm/yr. The location, depth and shallow thrusting focal mechanism solution all indicate this earthquake likely occurred on the subduction zone interface.

== Tsunami ==
A tsunami with a maximum height of 0.44 m (1.4 ft) was observed on Chiloé Island.

== See also ==
- List of earthquakes in 2016
- List of earthquakes in Chile
