= 2016 Sumatra earthquake =

Earthquake off the coast of Sumatra, Indonesia

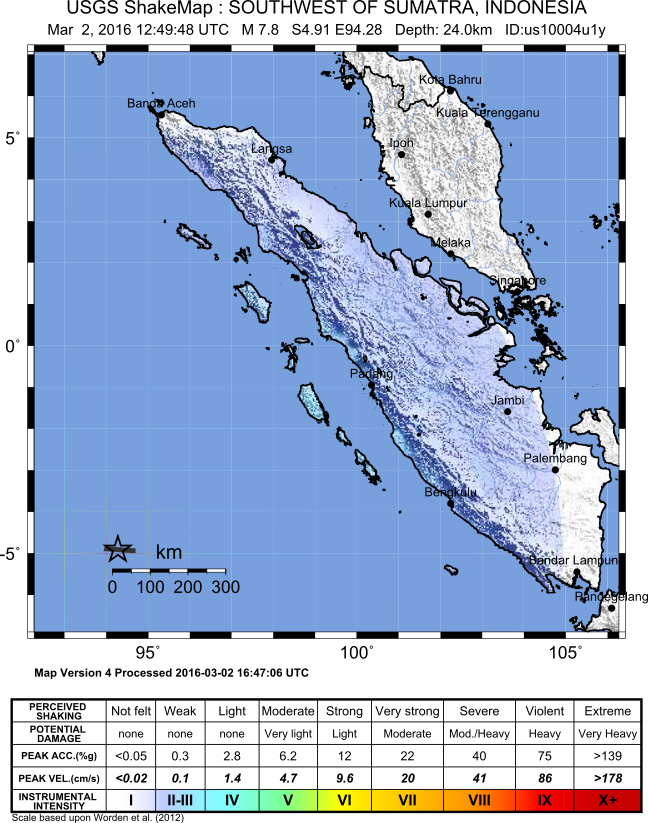
- UTC time: 2016-03-02 12:49:48
- ISC event: 611461544
- USGS-ANSS: ComCat
- Local date: 2 March 2016
- Local time: 7:49 p.m local time (UTC+7)
- Magnitude: 7.8 M_{w}
- Depth: 24 km (15 mi)
- Epicenter: 4.908°S 94.275°E
- Areas affected: Sumatra
- Max. intensity: MMI V (Moderate)
- Tsunami: 0.54 m (1.8 ft)
- Casualties: None

The 2016 Sumatra earthquake was a 7.8 magnitude earthquake which struck on 2 March 2016 in the Indian Ocean, approximately 800 kilometers (500 miles) southwest of Sumatra in Indonesia. Tsunami warnings were issued for Indonesia and Australia, but were withdrawn two hours later. There were no deaths directly related to the earthquake.

== Description ==
The United States Geological Survey stated that the earthquake struck Wednesday evening and had a magnitude of 7.8. Originally, the USGS gave the earthquake a magnitude of 8.2; this was later downgraded to 8.1, then 7.9, until the official magnitude was confirmed to be 7.8.

The earthquake was centered under the ocean at a depth of 10 kilometers (6.2 miles). It was determined that the earthquake was a result of movement on a strike-slip fault, and was similar to the 2012 Indian Ocean earthquakes. The epicenter of the earthquake was approximately 805 kilometers (500 miles) southwest of Padang, the capital of the province of West Sumatra; the closest inhabited land to the epicenter was the Mentawai Islands, also part of West Sumatra. Tremors from the quake were felt as far away as Singapore and Malaysia, though no injuries were reported outside of Indonesia.

About three hours after the initial earthquake (around 11:00 p.m. local time), a second, less powerful earthquake struck about 242 kilometers (150 miles) northeast of the original epicenter. With a magnitude of 5.2 and a depth of 123 miles, it was determined that this aftershock did not pose a tsunami risk.

== Effect and aftermath ==
The earthquake caused a landslide in Bukittinggi that blocked a road. Initial reports of the earthquake and subsequent tsunami warnings caused many inhabitants of Sumatra and the surrounding regions to flee to higher ground. However, within several hours of the earthquake, the government of Indonesia had lifted all tsunami warnings for the area. Australian government organizations also lifted tsunami warnings put in effect for Cocos Island, Christmas Island, and parts of coastal mainland Australia. The head of Indonesia's Meteorology and Geophysics Agency, Andi Eka Sakya, stated that the "potential for a tsunami" was "very small", because the epicenter of the quake was not located along a major fault or subduction zone.

== See also ==
- List of earthquakes in 2016
- List of earthquakes in Indonesia
