= Pingshan, Chongqing =

Pingshan 坪山镇
- Town
- Location within Chongqing Location within China
- Coordinates: 30°05′50″N 107°25′30″E
- Country: People's Republic of China
- Direct-administered Municipality: Chongqing
- County: Dianjiang County

Area
  - Total: 79 km^{2} (31 sq mi)

Population (2015)
  - Total: 50,278
- Time zone: UTC+8 (China Standard)
- Postal code: 408317

Pingshan, Chongqing
- Traditional Chinese: 坪山鎮
- Simplified Chinese: 坪山镇
Transcriptions
Standard Mandarin
- Hanyu Pinyin: Píngshān Zhèn

Alternative Chinese name
- Chinese: 坪山
Transcriptions
Standard Mandarin
- Hanyu Pinyin: Píngshān

Pingshan (Chinese: 坪山; pinyin: Píngshān) is a town located in the southeast of Dianjiang County of Chongqing Municipality. As of 2015, it has 3 communities and 13 villages under its administration.

== History ==
The town's set-up time is no clear date, because it have Heyouping ancient castle ruins, Although the castle has been planned as a tourist attraction. But it is certain that in July 2000 the town was renamed Pingshan Town.

== Culture ==
The town culture belong to Bayu culture, the same as Chongqing City culture.

== Community ==
Name	Chinese	Hanyu Pinyin
Wenchang Community	文昌社区	Wénchāng Shèqū
Huilong Community	回龙社区	Huílóng Shèqū
Jiulong Community	九龙社区	Jiŭlóng Shèqū

== Village ==
Name	Chinese	Hanyu Pinyin
Daping Village	大坪村	Dàpíng Cūn
Huangjue Village	黄桷村	Huángjúe Cūn
Xudong Village	旭东村	Xùdōng Cūn
Xinfeng Village	新风村	Xīnfēng Cūn
Baixing Village	百兴村	Bǎixīng Cūn
Shuangfeng Village	双丰村	Shuāngfēng Cūn
Yingchun Village	迎春村	Yíngchūn Cūn
Lianhua Village	莲花村	Liánhuā Cūn
Lianhe Village	联合村	Liánhé Cūn
Longxi Village	龙溪村	Lóngxī Cūn
Dengling Village	登陵村	Dēnglíng Cūn
Gufo Village	古佛村	Gǔfó Cūn
Yangliu Village	杨柳村	Yángliǔ Cūn

== Economic ==
Pingshan Town from January to September 2015, industrial output value of 710 million yuan, an increase of 21.4%; total output value of industrial enterprises above designated size was 66.34 million yuan, an increase of 17.8%. Fixed assets investment 346 million yuan, an increase of 77.6%. Actual capital investment 430 million yuan, an increase of 72.3%, actual domestic capital 317 million yuan, an increase of 229%.

== See also ==
- List of township-level divisions of Chongqing
