= Dianjiang County =

Dianjiang 垫江县 Tienkiang
- County
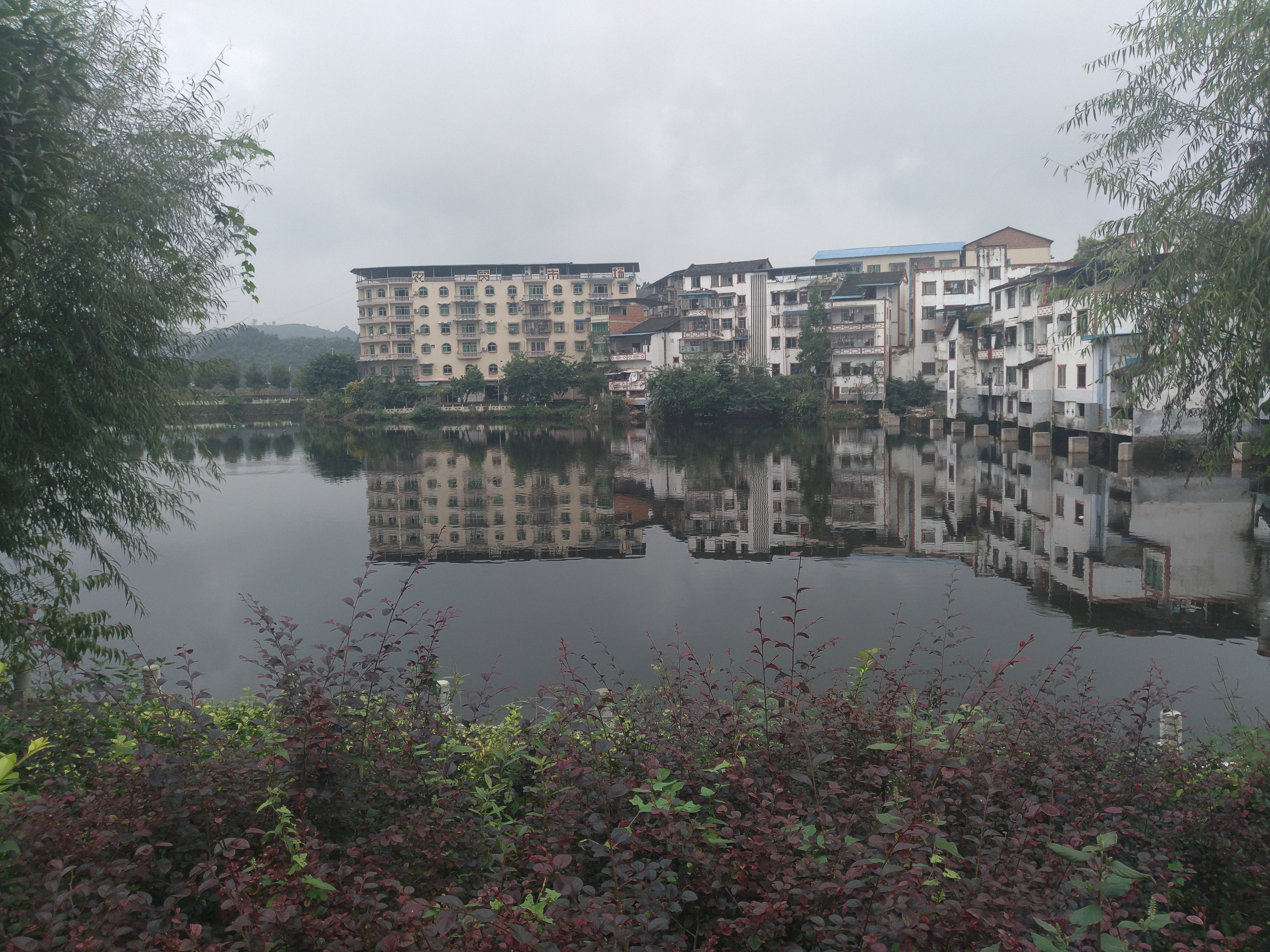

- Location of Dianjiang County in Chongqing
- Interactive map of Dianjiang
- Country: People's Republic of China
- Municipality: Chongqing

Area
  - County: 1,518 km^{2} (586 sq mi)

Population (2020)
  - County: 650,694
  - Density: 428.7/km^{2} (1,110/sq mi)
  - Urban: 320,460 (49%)
  - Rural: 330,234 (51%)
- Time zone: UTC+8 (China Standard)

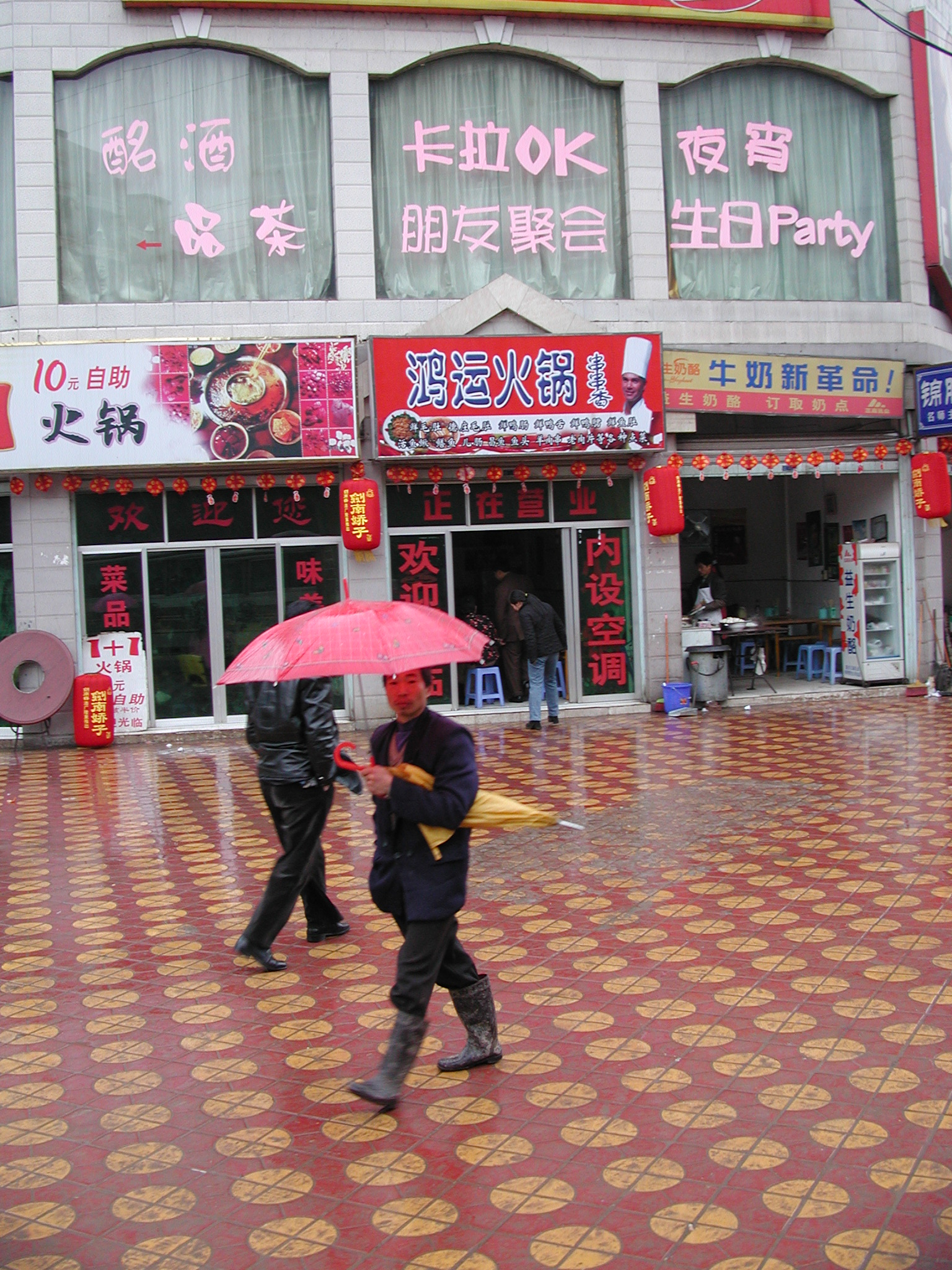
Typical retail street in Dianjiang

Dianjiang County (simplified Chinese: 垫江县; traditional Chinese: 墊江縣; pinyin: Diànjiāng Xiàn) is a county in the northeast of Chongqing Municipality, China, bordering Sichuan province to the northwest. As of 2015, it has two subdistricts, two townships, and 22 towns under its administration.

== History ==
Dianjiang County was developed in the time of the Western Wei Emperor Gong Di in 555 CE. Before the Chongqing area became a municipality, Dianjiang belonged to other regions. From October 1, 1949, to March 14, 1997, it belonged to Dazhu, Fuling prefecture.

== Administrative divisions ==
Dianjiang has two subdistricts, two townships, five regional center towns and 17 general towns.

Subdistricts
Subdistricts	Chinese
Guiyang Subdistrict	桂阳街道
Guixi Subdistrict	桂溪街道

Townships
Townships	Chinese
Dashi Township	大石乡
Shaping Township	沙坪乡

Regional center towns
Towns	Chinese	Towns	Chinese	Towns	Chinese
Chengxi Town	澄溪镇	Gao'an Town	高安镇	Gaofeng Town	高峰镇
Pingshan Town	坪山镇	Zhoujia Town	周嘉镇		

General towns
Towns	Chinese	Towns	Chinese	Towns	Chinese	Towns	Chinese
Xinmin Town	新民镇	Shaping Town	沙坪镇	Pushun Town	普顺镇	Yongping Town	永平镇
Yong'an Town	永安镇	Wudong Town	五洞镇	Taiping Town	太平镇	Sanxi Town	三溪镇
Yantai Town	砚台镇	Heyou Town	鹤游镇	Caohui Town	曹回镇	Peixing Town	裴兴镇
Changlong Town	长龙镇	Gangjia Town	杠家镇	Huangsha Town	黄沙镇		
Wangjia Town	汪家镇	Baojia Town	包家镇	Baijia Town	白家镇		

== Climate ==
Climate data for Dianjiang, elevation 416 m (1,365 ft), (1991–2020 normals, extremes 1981–present)
Month	Jan	Feb	Mar	Apr	May	Jun	Jul	Aug	Sep	Oct	Nov	Dec	Year
Record high °C (°F)	17.9 (64.2)	25.0 (77.0)	34.5 (94.1)	35.1 (95.2)	36.2 (97.2)	37.3 (99.1)	39.5 (103.1)	42.1 (107.8)	40.6 (105.1)	34.3 (93.7)	27.0 (80.6)	17.8 (64.0)	42.1 (107.8)
Mean daily maximum °C (°F)	9.1 (48.4)	12.0 (53.6)	16.9 (62.4)	22.5 (72.5)	25.9 (78.6)	28.7 (83.7)	32.5 (90.5)	32.9 (91.2)	27.7 (81.9)	21.4 (70.5)	16.3 (61.3)	10.3 (50.5)	21.4 (70.4)
Daily mean °C (°F)	6.4 (43.5)	8.7 (47.7)	12.7 (54.9)	17.7 (63.9)	21.3 (70.3)	24.3 (75.7)	27.7 (81.9)	27.6 (81.7)	23.3 (73.9)	17.8 (64.0)	13.1 (55.6)	7.8 (46.0)	17.4 (63.3)
Mean daily minimum °C (°F)	4.4 (39.9)	6.3 (43.3)	9.8 (49.6)	14.3 (57.7)	18.0 (64.4)	21.2 (70.2)	24.0 (75.2)	23.7 (74.7)	20.3 (68.5)	15.5 (59.9)	10.9 (51.6)	6.0 (42.8)	14.5 (58.2)
Record low °C (°F)	−2.7 (27.1)	−1.3 (29.7)	−0.4 (31.3)	4.8 (40.6)	9.5 (49.1)	14.0 (57.2)	17.4 (63.3)	17.7 (63.9)	13.4 (56.1)	5.1 (41.2)	0.7 (33.3)	−3.1 (26.4)	−3.1 (26.4)
Average precipitation mm (inches)	20.6 (0.81)	22.4 (0.88)	55.6 (2.19)	107.8 (4.24)	173.5 (6.83)	165.4 (6.51)	152.4 (6.00)	151.2 (5.95)	128.7 (5.07)	116.8 (4.60)	62.4 (2.46)	23.3 (0.92)	1,180.1 (46.46)
Average precipitation days (≥ 0.1 mm)	10.4	9.3	12.1	14.4	16.3	15.5	11.4	11.4	12.7	15.7	11.7	10.3	151.2
Average snowy days	1.1	0.5	0	0	0	0	0	0	0	0	0	0.2	1.8
Average relative humidity (%)	83	79	77	77	78	81	76	72	78	84	84	85	80
Mean monthly sunshine hours	30.5	39.6	81.0	115.9	117.2	116.2	188.3	195.6	118.9	69.7	54.9	28.3	1,156.1
Percentage possible sunshine	9	12	22	30	28	28	44	48	33	20	17	9	25
Source: China Meteorological Administration

== Economics ==
Based on statistics from October 2015, in the first three quarters, Dianjiang County achieved a GDP of 16.63 billion yuan (an increase of 11.4 percent, and faster than the growth in the previous six months by 0.4 percentage points). The contributions to the GDP were composed of the primary sector producing 2.17 billion yuan (an increase of 4.5%); the secondary sector producing 8.78 billion yuan (an increase of 12.6%); and the tertiary sector producing 5.68 billion yuan (an increase of 12.2%).

== Transportation ==
The area is served by Dianjiang railway station on the Chongqing–Wanzhou intercity railway.
