= 2016 Solomon Islands earthquakes =

Seismic events

8 December 2016 Solomon Islands earthquake
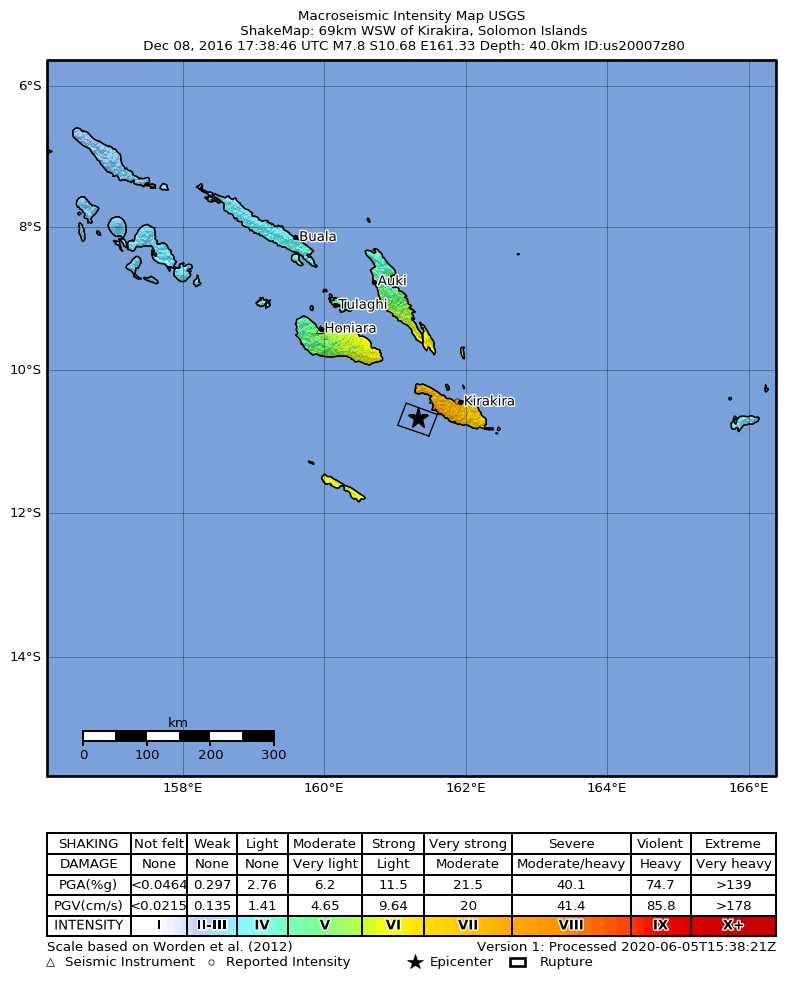
- UTC time: 2016-12-08 17:38:46
- ISC event: 611831246
- USGS-ANSS: ComCat
- Local date: 9 December 2016
- Local time: 04:38
- Duration: >1 minute
- Magnitude: 7.8 M_{ww}
- Depth: 40.0 km (24.9 mi)
- Epicenter: 10°40′52″S 161°19′37″E
- Fault: San Cristobal-New Britain Trench
- Type: Oblique-reverse
- Total damage: 1000+ buildings damaged or destroyed
- Max. intensity: MMI VIII (Severe)
- Tsunami: 0.43 metres
- Landslides: Yes
- Aftershocks: M_{ww} 6.5; M_{ww} 6.9
- Casualties: 1 dead

On 9 December 2016 at 4:38 a.m. (UTC +11) local time (17:38:46 UTC), the Solomon Islands region was rocked by an M_{ww}7.8 earthquake, centred 30 km off San Cristobal Island, about 61 km southwest of Kirakira, the capital of Makira-Ulawa Province. Initially registering magnitude 8.0, later downgraded to 7.8, the temblor prompted tsunami warnings that kept countries surrounding the Coral, Tasman and Solomon Sea on high alert, but was later cancelled. A large aftershock of magnitude 6.9 occurred shortly afterwards. This earthquake was largely felt, waking many residents who later ran to high ground for fears of a potential tsunami. The earthquake killed a child and affected some 34,000 people in Makira, South Malaita and Guadalcanal Island where many had lost their homes or had no access to basic needs. Earthquakes are common in this region, with little or no fatalities. This earthquake is tied with three other magnitude 7.8 earthquakes for the second largest earthquake of 2016. On 17 December, Solomon Islands would be rattled again by a 7.9 magnitude earthquake, this time 54 km east of Taron, Papua New Guinea.

== Geological setting ==
The Australian Woodlark, Solomon Sea and Pacific plates are converging at a rate of 97 mm/yr. The earthquake was a result of interaction between the Australian and Pacific plates along a subduction zone. Subduction of the Australian Plate has also given rise to volcanoes in the region. This region of the world lies along the Pacific Ring of Fire, where 90 percent of all earthquake and volcanic activity is concentrated here.

== Earthquake ==
The earthquake occurred along the boundary interface where the Australian and Pacific Plates make contact. Focal mechanism suggests this event was a result of oblique-reverse faulting. The earthquake did not rupture to the trench, terminating at a depth of 20 km, with its epicenter at 40 km. An average slip has been estimated at 5 meters. The earthquake may also be a deep compressional intraslab event occurring on a fault located within the subducting plate; known as intraplate earthquakes because they happen in a plate rather than at the boundary of two.

=== Tsunami ===
The main earthquake triggered tsunami warnings directed at Solomon Islands, Vanuatu, Papua New Guinea, Nauru, New Caledonia, Tuvalu and Kosrae in the Federated States of Micronesia, issued by the Pacific Tsunami Warning Center. In New Caledonia, people were ordered to evacuate and leave for higher ground. Warnings for American Samoa and Hawaii were cancelled shortly after. The International Tsunami Information Center warned of tsunamis between 1 and 3 meters. However, the highest waves were measured at only 0.43 meters (1.41 feet) on Marika Island.

=== Aftershocks ===
A 6.5 magnitude earthquake struck about four hours after the initial quake, and later a 6.9 one day after the mainshock. The 6.9 aftershock prompted new tsunami warnings with forecasted waves of 0.30 meters (0.98 feet).

== Aftermath ==
Phone and electricity lines were cut-off throughout the country in the immediate aftermath. On Malaita Island, there were reports that between 35 and 40 buildings had been damaged. In Guadalcanal, the collapse of a home killed one person. In Kirakira, many homes, a hospital, a church, and the World Vision office sustained serious damage. Damage at the hospital forced the evacuation of 20 people. Two schools in Marika and Ugi were completely destroyed. Fissures and landslides were also seen in the affected region. People who fled to higher ground continued to stay on the hills for fears of a large tsunami. Twenty-five houses were washed away from the moderate tsunami. In total, over 1000 homes were damaged, along with 20 schools and four clinics. More than 9,769 people were affected by the earthquake.

=== International reaction ===
Julie Bishop, the Australian foreign minister at the time said that the country is prepared to offer their support to Solomon Islands.

== 17 December earthquake ==
17 December 2016 Solomon Islands earthquake
- Location within Papua New Guinea
- UTC time: 2016-12-17 10:51:10
- ISC event: 611831311
- USGS-ANSS: ComCat
- Local date: 17 December 2016
- Local time: 20:51
- Magnitude: 7.9 M_{w}
- Depth: 94.5 km (58.7 mi)
- Epicenter: 4°30′18″S 153°31′19″E
- Type: First subevent reverse Second subevent thrust
- Max. intensity: MMI VII (Very strong)
- Tsunami: 1.25 m (4.1 ft)
- Casualties: None

On 17 December, the largest earthquake in the year 2016, a magnitude 7.9 earthquake struck Papua New Guinea. It was centred between the islands of New Ireland and Bougainville. The earthquake did not cause any major damage or casualties but did result in power outages.

The earthquake had an intermediate depth of 94.5 km beneath the surface. The initial event was a result of reverse faulting within a subducting oceanic lithosphere which lasted for 30 seconds. After the intraslab rupture, a deep portion of the subduction zone began to slip at a depth of 32 to 47 km, releasing energy comparable to the first event. The shallow megathrust rupture was evident in the large number of shallow aftershocks. Due to the two separate events occurring closely in timing and location, it was considered a doublet earthquake.

== See also ==
- List of earthquakes in 2016
- List of earthquakes in Papua New Guinea
- 2017 Papua New Guinea earthquake
- List of earthquakes in the Solomon Islands archipelago
