= Strada statale 4 Via Salaria =

State highway in Italy

State Highway 4
- Strada statale 4
- Salaria

Route information
- Maintained by ANAS
- Length: 208.2 km (129.4 mi) reduced to 175 km since the Ascoli-Porto d'Ascoli trait was declassed to provincial road
- Existed: 1928–present

Major junctions
- From: City centre of Rome
- Tangenziale Est and GRA in Rome; Autostrada A1 at Settebagni; SS 313 in Passo Corese; SS 636 di Palombara at Borgo Quinzio; SS 79 Ternana and SS 578 Salto Cicolana in Rieti; SS 17 in Antrodoco; SS 471 di Leonessa at Posta; SS 260 Picente at Amatrice; SS 685 delle Tre Valli Umbre at Arquata del Tronto; Raccordo autostradale 11 and SS 81 Piceno Aprutina at Ascoli Piceno
- To: SS 16 Adriatica at Porto d'Ascoli

Location
- Country: Italy
- Regions: Lazio, Marche

Highway system
- Roads in Italy; Autostrade; State; Regional; Provincial; Municipal
← SS 3	→ SS 5

Strada statale 4 Via Salaria (SS 4) is an Italian state highway 208.2 kilometres (129.4 mi) long in Italy located in the regions of Lazio and Marche, linking Rome to the Adriatic Sea passing through Rieti and Ascoli Piceno. Its route retraces that of the ancient Via Salaria Roman road. It is a single carriageway highway for most of its route.

== Route ==
=== Rome to Rieti ===
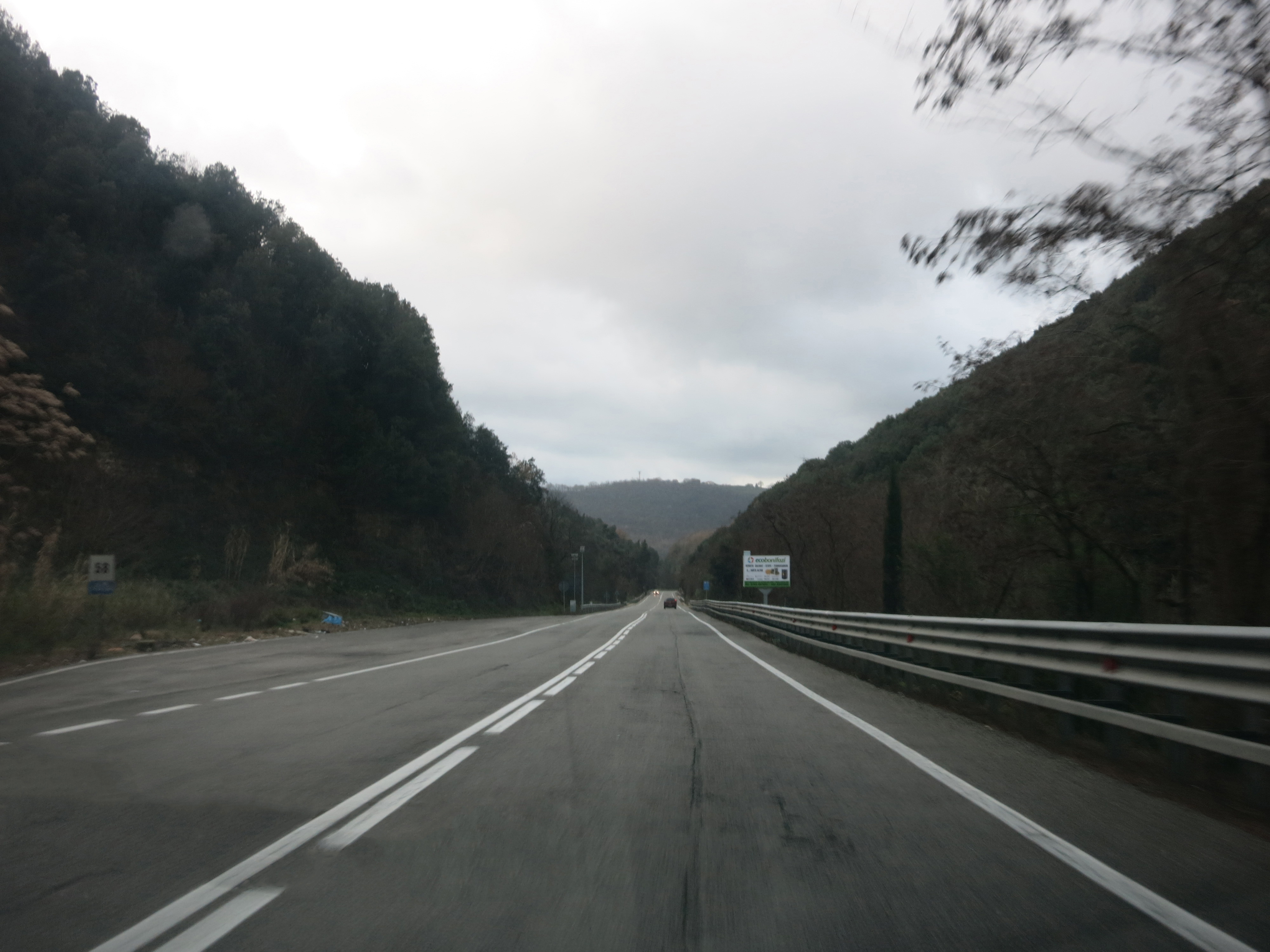
SS 4 as seen near Poggio San Lorenzo

Strada statale 4 Via Salaria starts Northeast of Rome, just outside the Aurelian Walls, where until 1921 Porta Salaria was located to control access to the city. The initial stretch of SS 4 is more similar to an urban road than to a highway, as the area has now become densely populated and buildings have been raised by the roadside. After four kilometres SS4 meets Tangenziale Est di Roma and, from that point on, becomes a busy dual carriageway urban road, filled by people leaving or entering the city.

In the Castel Giubileo neighborhood, SS4 exits the city of Rome and meets Grande Raccordo Anulare (GRA), where most of the traffic flows. Immediately after, the road returns a single carriageway highway; in fact the subsequent 20 kilometer stretch, from the GRA to Passo Corese, has seen his importance reduced since the 6-lane Autostrada A1 runs parallel to it and absorbs most of the long-distance traffic. Nevertheless, SS4 remains important to many mid-sized towns in Rome's hinterland, such as Settebagni, Monterotondo and Mentana.

Passo Corese marks both the point where SS4 enters the Province of Rieti and the point where it diverges from Autostrada A1, receiving from it all traffic to the Adriatic. The road here leaves the Tiber valley and ventures into the more hilly Sabina region, commencing its long, gradual ascent to the Apennines. For this reason, SS4 had once a rather rough course from here on, with tight bends and continuous rises and descents; current SS4 is a completely new road (constructed in the 1960s to replace the old one from Passo Corese to Rieti), much more straight and wide, albeit still with a single carriageway.

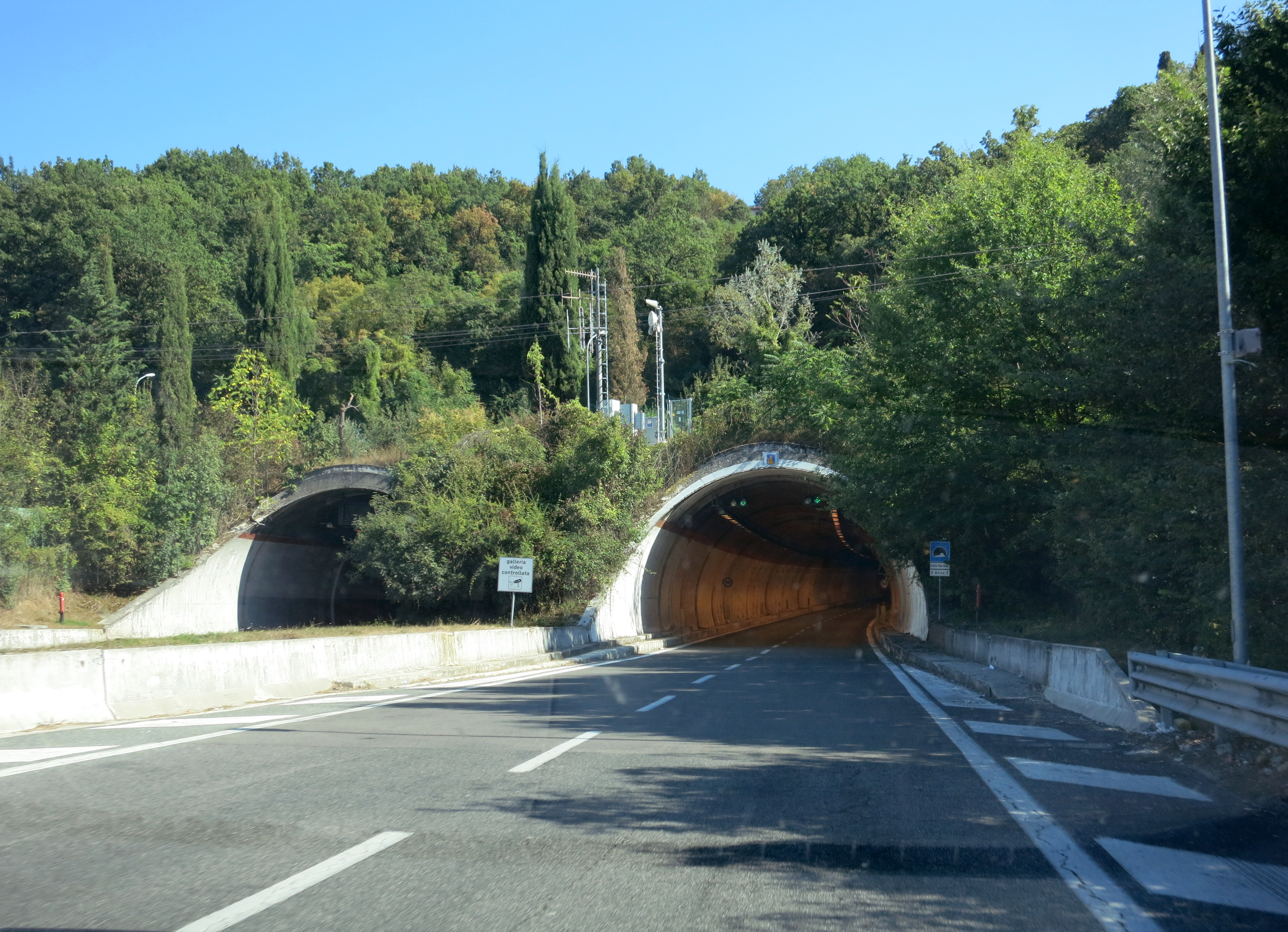
The 4.5 km (2.8 mi), dual carriageway road tunnel "Colle Giardino", near Rieti

As the road passes the Sabine mountains, it reaches an altitude of 400 metres above sea level at Osteria Nuova and it descends into a narrow valley, then rises again until reaching 570 metres in the village of Ornaro, and finally descends.

6 km (3.7 mi) south of province capital Rieti the road becomes a dual carriageway road; the long "Colle Giardino" road tunnel allows the road to leave Sabine mountains behind and to enter the Rieti plain (400 metres on sea level) where the city is settled.

=== Rieti to the Adriatic ===
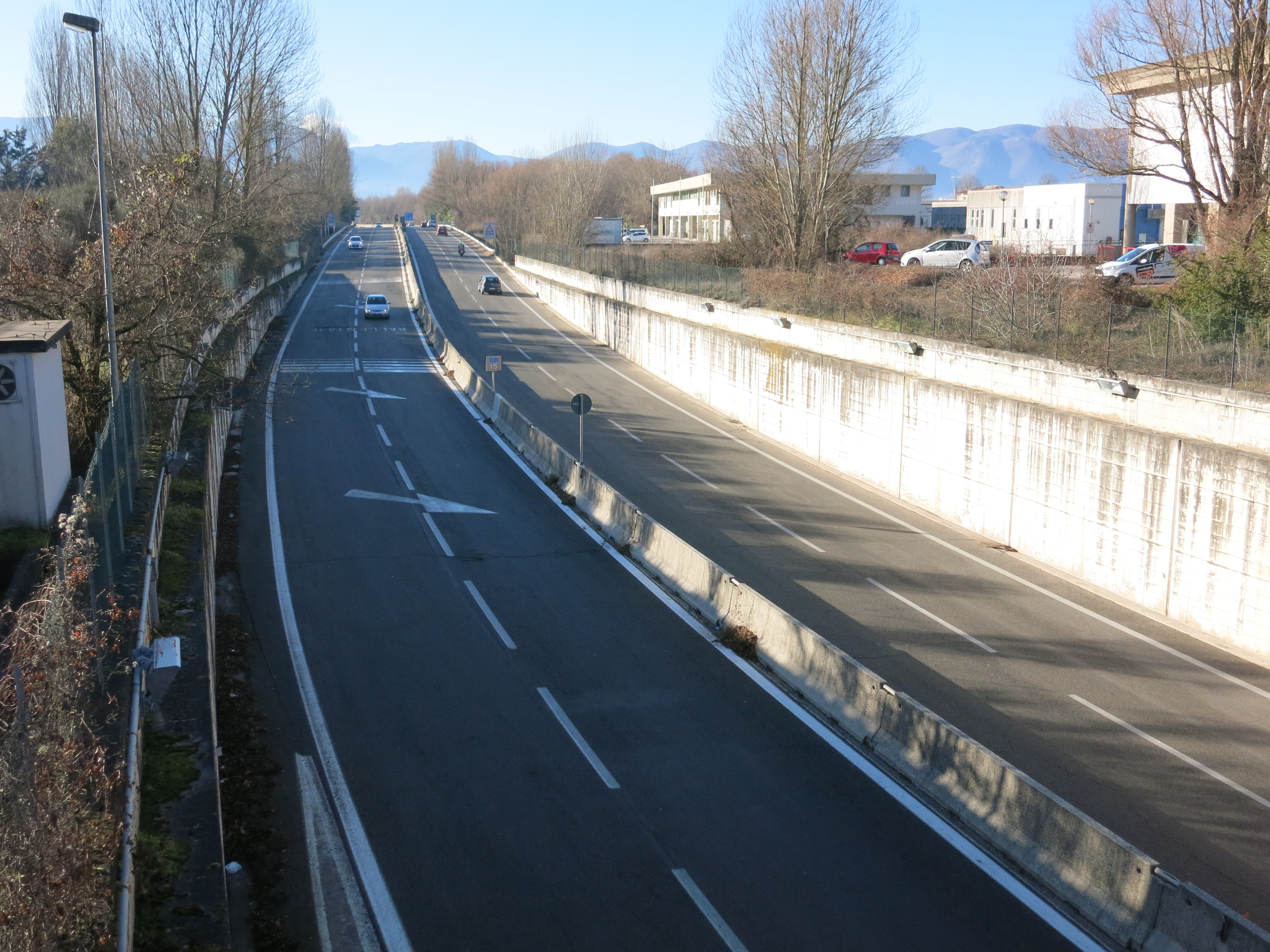
Dual carriageway trait in Rieti

In Rieti SS4 turns sharply into East, quickly leaves the Rieti plain and prosecutes in the Velino valley. Shortly before Cittaducale, the road returns a single carriageway and pretty narrow road, which still needs to be uprated and follows a similar path to the ancient Roman road. While slightly ascending, SS4 reaches the spa town of Cotilia and then Antrodoco, where it joins State Highway 17 to L'Aquila.

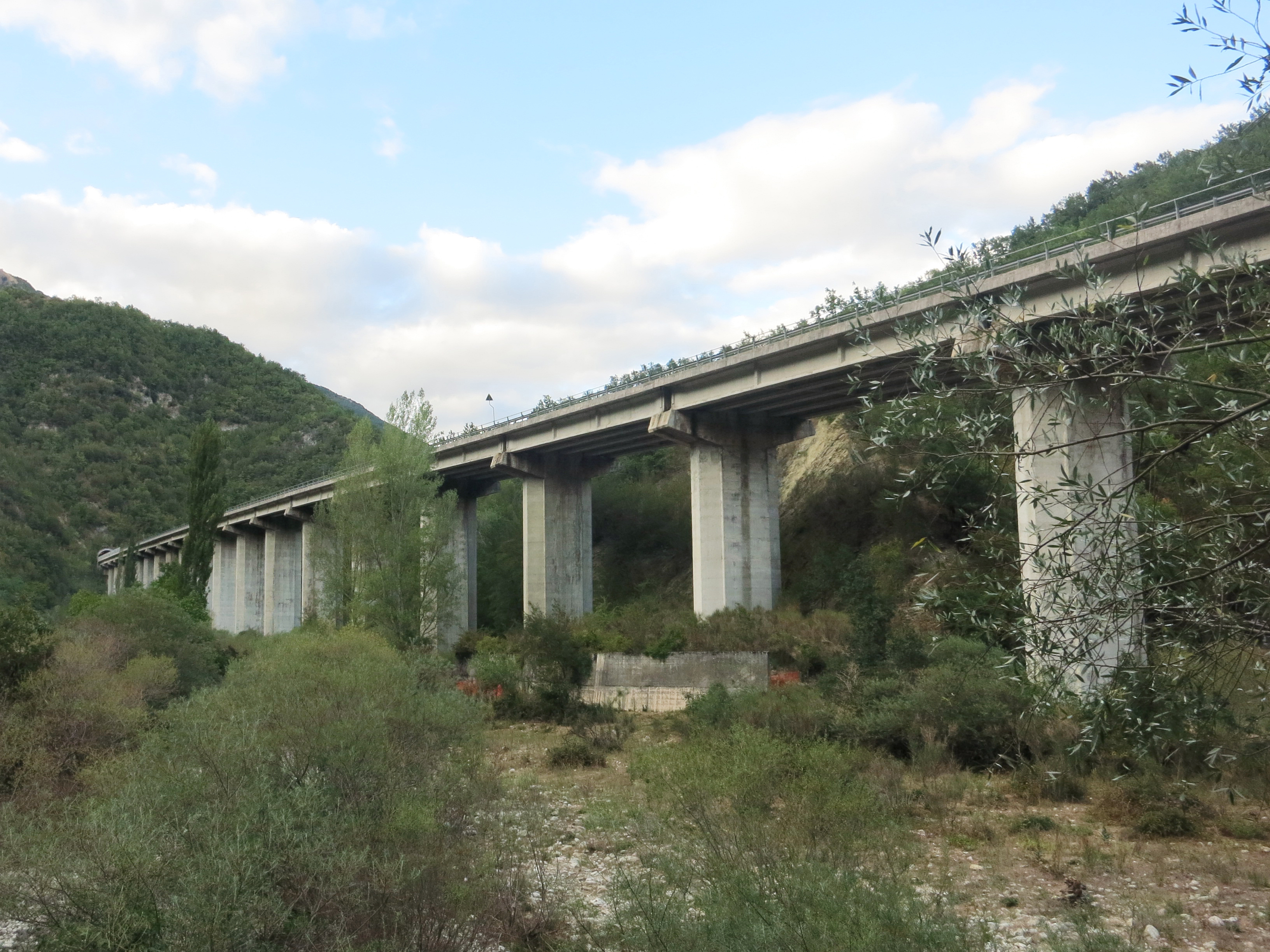
The Velino viaduct, in the Gole del Velino canyon

In Antrodoco (470 metres on sea level) the road follows the river's valley, bending to the north and entering the narrow "Gole del Velino" canyon. Here SS4 becomes similar to a mountain road, since bends become more tight and the ascent more steep; but halfway through the canyon, a recently uprated stretch of the road begins, where tunnels and viaducts make the road smoother albeit still with a single carriageway.

In Posta, at 700 metres above sea level, SS4 leaves the canyon and keeps going up in a broader plateau. Shortly after Cittareale the highway reaches its upper point, the Torrita Pass, at around 1010 metres on the sea level.

From here on the roads descents following the course of the narrow Tronto valley. Soon after Amatrice and Accumoli, the road leaves Lazio and enters the region of Marche. Passing through Arquata del Tronto (780 metres on sea level) and Acquasanta Terme (390 metres), SS4 keeps descending until it reaches province capital Ascoli Piceno (150 metres on sea level).

After Ascoli the road continues towards the Adriatic Sea with a rather winding path, where it ends in a junction with SS 16 Adriatica and the Autostrada A14 in Porto d'Ascoli (near San Benedetto del Tronto). Still, such trait has been recently declassed to provincial road, since it has been replaced by Raccordo autostradale 11, a more modern dual carriageway road.

== Future interventions ==
Today SS4 is a busy road between Rieti and Passo Corese, as it is the main road link between Rieti and Rome; motorists use it to reach the Autostrada A1 in Passo Corese and continue towards Rome in the more modern road. In this trait SS4 has a single, albeit reasonably wide carriageway, which was constructed in the 1960s in place of an earlier, less smooth road. For this reason, Italian Government plans to make SS4 a dual carriageway road between Rieti and Passo Corese, but around 1.5 billion euros are needed and it is not known when funds will be granted.

Uprating of the trait from Cittaducale to Posta, where the carriageway is rather narrow and the road climbs up the Apennine Mountains, is also planned to make the carriageway wider and less winding - even if the road will remain with a single carriageway. The first part of these road works started in 2005 on the Posta-Micigliano stretch and are currently underway.

== Route table ==
=== From San Giovanni Reatino to Santa Rufina ===
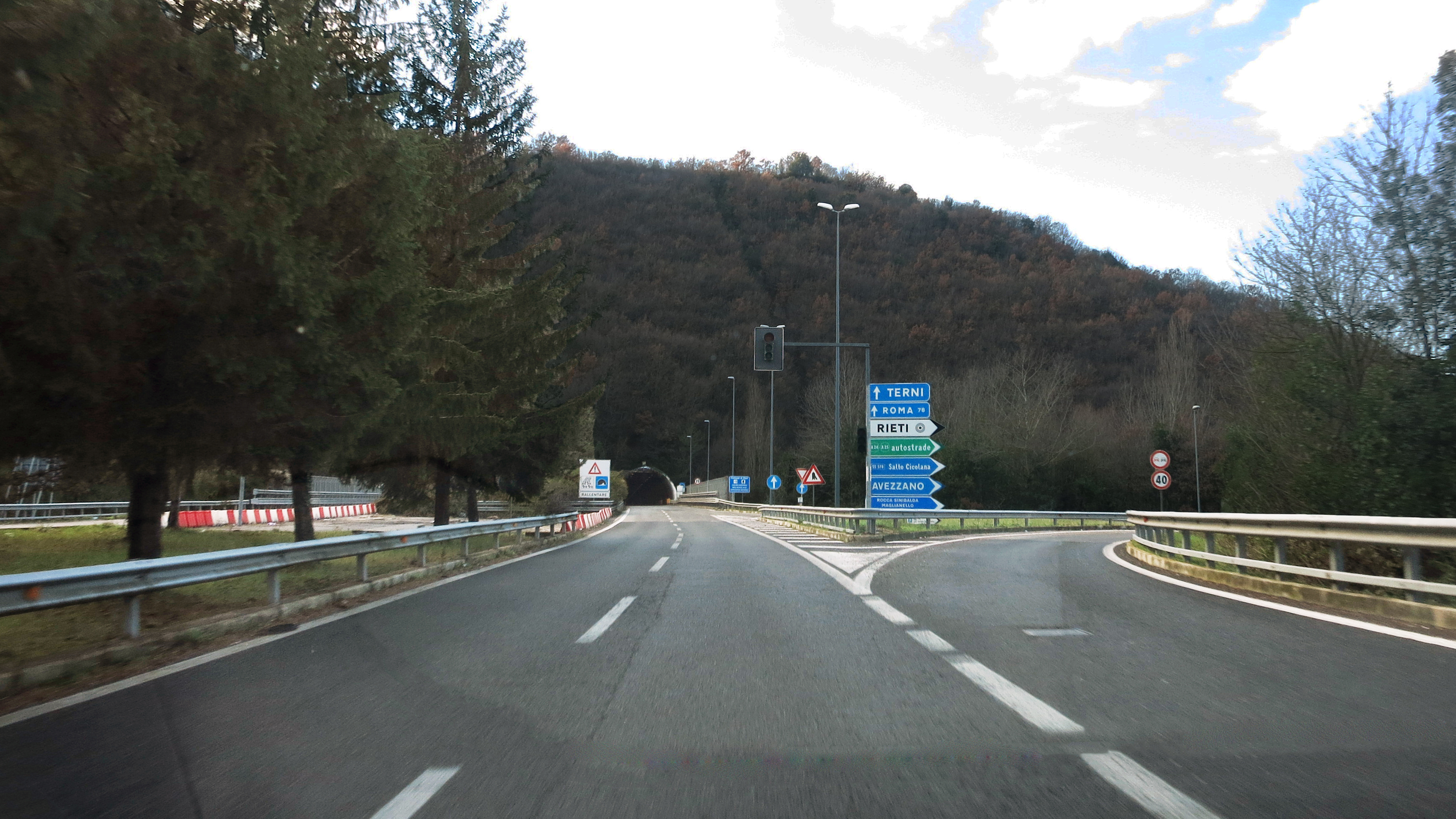
Rieti Est exit

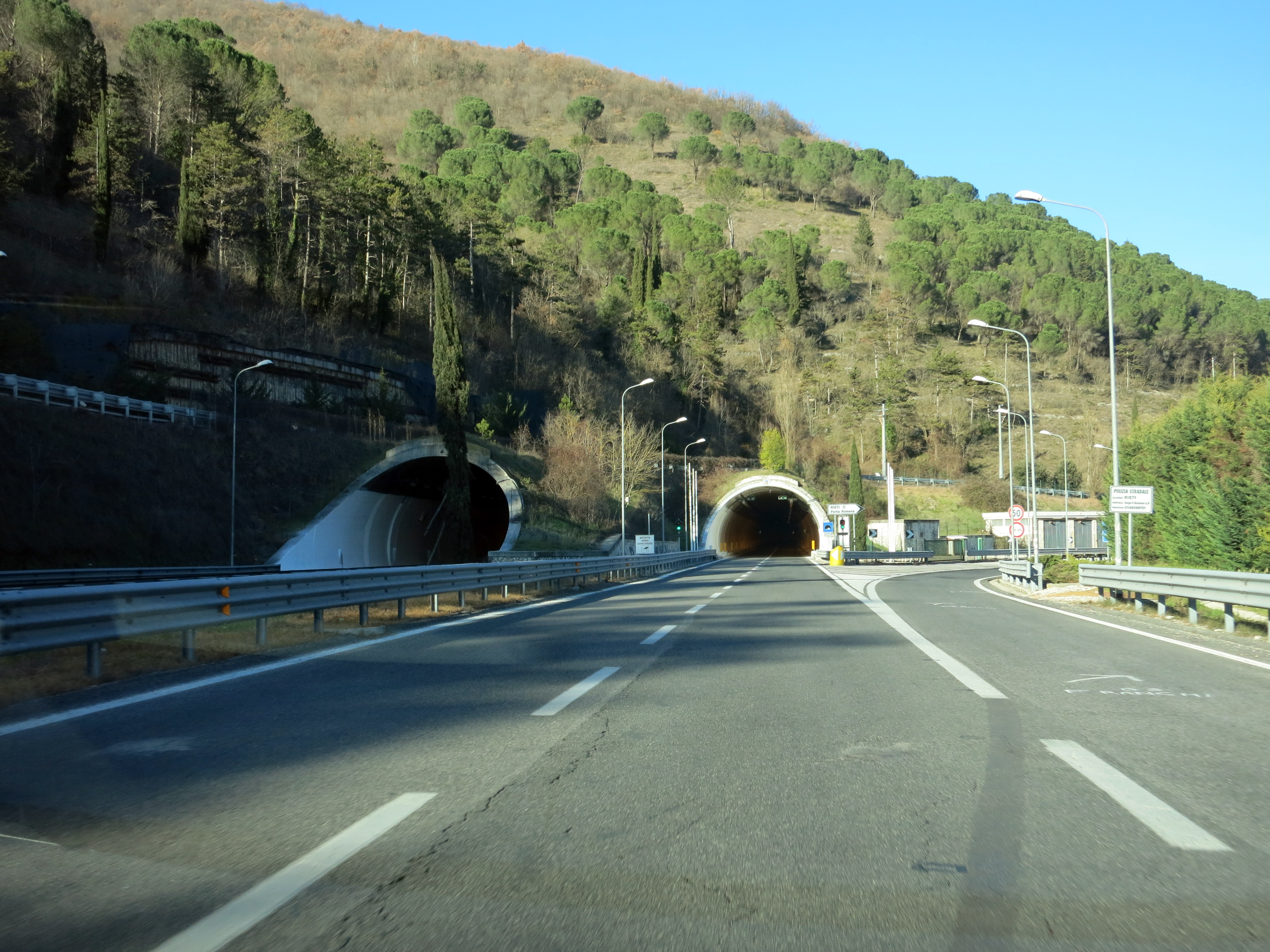
NSA 265 exit

Via Salaria; San Giovanni Reatino - Santa Rufina section
↓km↓	Exit
75.4 km (46.9 mi)	Ternana; Terni; Contigliano; Greccio; Rieti Ovest
75.8 km (47.1 mi)	Petrol station - Bar
77.6 km (48.2 mi)	Rieti Est; Salto-Cicolana; Borgorose; Lago del Salto; Autostrade A24 ed A25; Avezzano
78.1 km (48.5 mi)	del Nucleo Industriale; Industrial area of Rieti; Provincial hospital of Rieti; Monte Terminillo
81.9 km (50.9 mi)	Santa Rufina End of the freeway section

=== From Bivio Micigliano to Ascoli ===
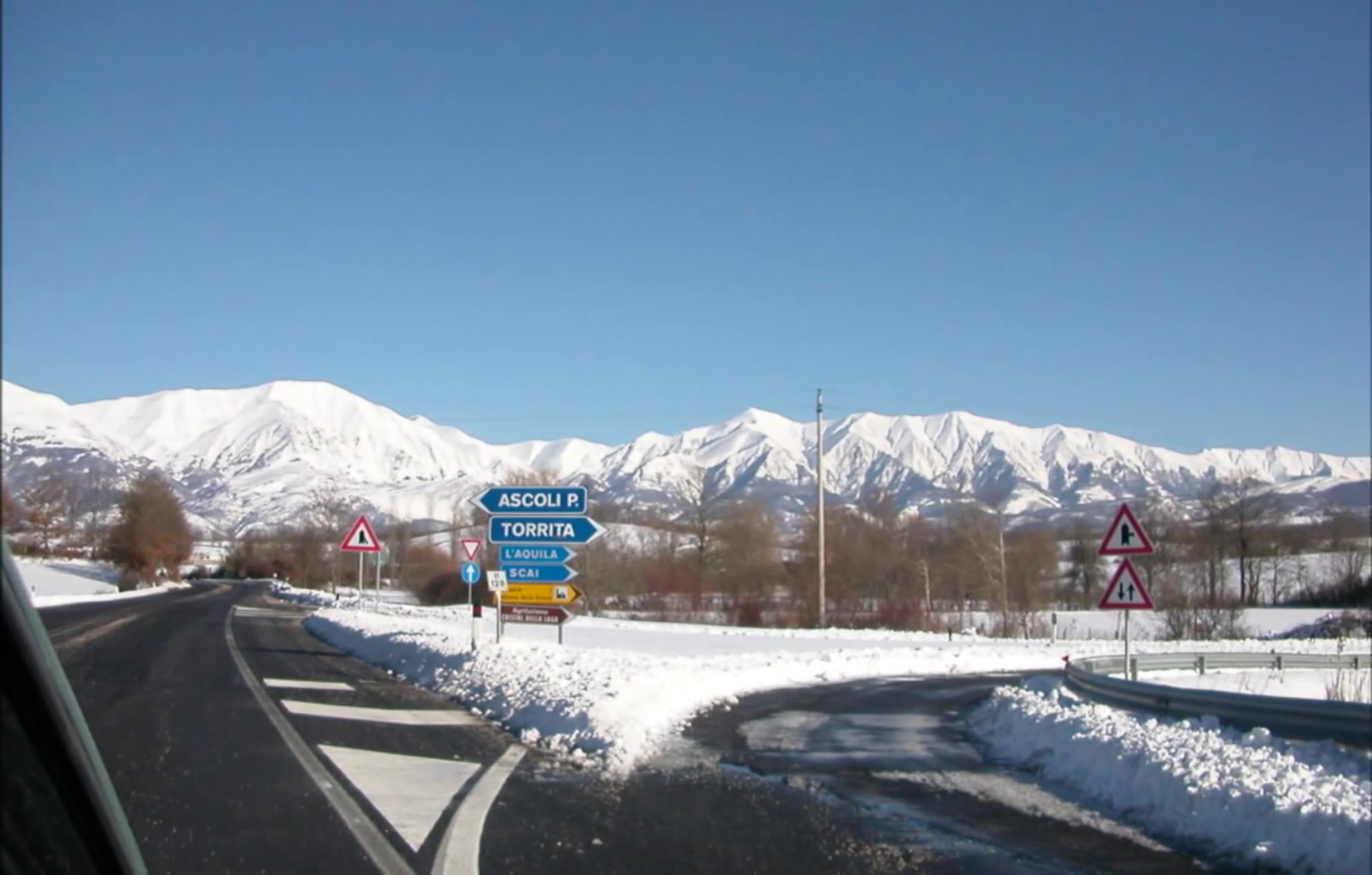
Torrita exit

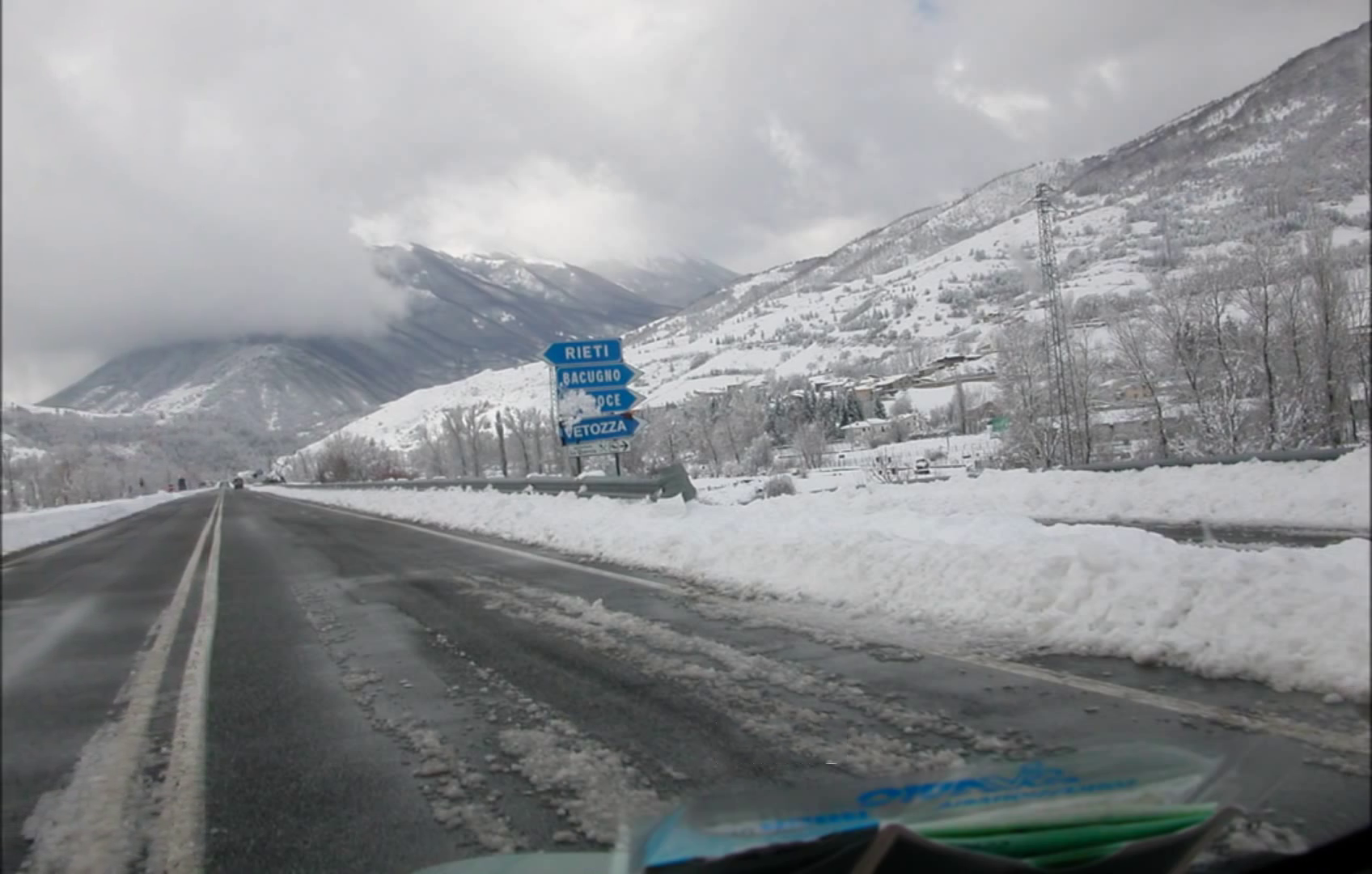
Bacugno exit

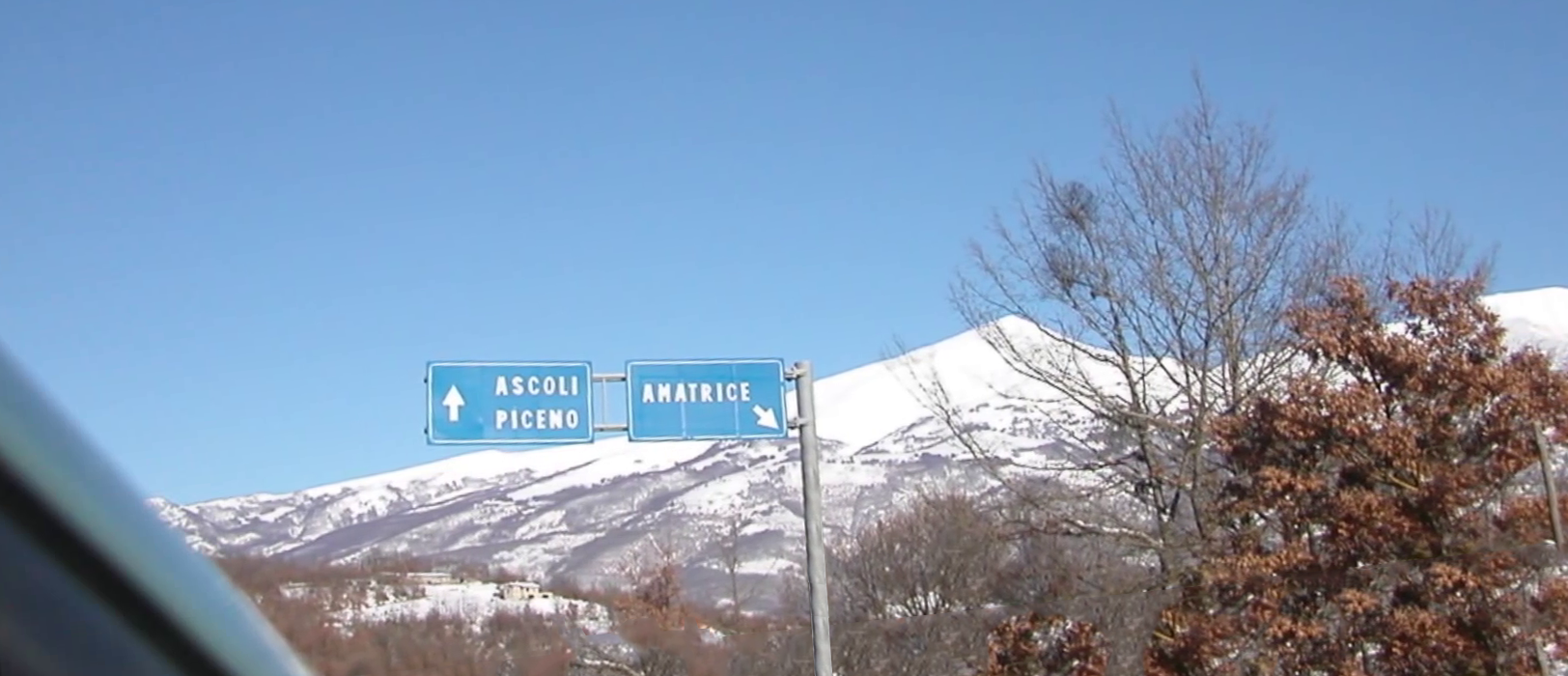
Amatrice exit

Via Salaria; Bivio Micigliano - Ascoli section
↓km↓	Exit
106.5 km (66.2 mi)	Sigillo sud
109.6 km (68.1 mi)	Sigillo nord
111 km (69 mi)	Petrol station - Bar - Restaurant
111.5 km (69.3 mi)	Posta
111.7 km (69.4 mi)	di LeonessaBorbona; Montereale
112.3 km (69.8 mi)	di LeonessaLeonessa; Cascia; Monteleone di Spoleto
112.7 km (70.0 mi)	Petrol station - Bar
112.9 km (70.2 mi)	Bacugno
115.5 km (71.8 mi)	Santa Croce - Vetozza - Bacugno - Piedimordenti
121.1 km (75.2 mi)	Cittareale - Selvarotonda
128.2 km (79.7 mi)	Torrita - L'Aquila - Scai
128.9 km (80.1 mi)	Santa Giusta - Bagnolo - San Giorgio - Collemoresco - Casale Nibbi
129.2 km (80.3 mi)	Petrol station
129.4 km (80.4 mi)	Santa Giusta - Bagnolo - San Giorgio - Collemoresco - Casale Nibbi
132 km (82 mi)	Amatrice - Lago di Campotosto
132.5 km (82.3 mi)	Amatrice - Lago di Campotosto
136 km (85 mi)	Saletta-Amatrice
138.7 km (86.2 mi)	Poggio Casoli
139.5 km (86.7 mi)	Accumoli-Fonte del campo-Poggio d'Api-Illica
140.2 km (87.1 mi)	Accumoli
141 km (88 mi)	Accumoli-Tino
144 km (89 mi)	Grisciano
146 km (91 mi)	Road to Pescara del Tronto
147.8 km (91.8 mi)	Vezzano
148.4 km (92.2 mi)	delle Tre Valli Umbre-Cascia - Norcia - Pescara del Tronto - Forca Canapine
150.3 km (93.4 mi)	Petrol station - Bar
150.4 km (93.5 mi)	Arquata - Pretare - Montegallo - Piedilama
150.6 km (93.6 mi)	Trisungo
151.3 km (94.0 mi)	Faete - Spelonga - Colle d'Arquata
155.5 km (96.6 mi)	Favalanciata
157.6 km (97.9 mi)	Quintodecimo
159.9 km (99.4 mi)	San Vito
160 km (99 mi)	Acquasanta Terme
161 km (100 mi)	Santa Maria - Pozza - Umito - Pito
162.4 km (100.9 mi)	Centrale - Fornara - Zona industriale
162.9 km (101.2 mi)	Petrol station - Bar
165.7 km (103.0 mi)	Arli - Ponte d'Arli
167 km (104 mi)	Arli - Ponte d'Arli
167.4 km (104.0 mi)	Giustimana
169.4 km (105.3 mi)	Petrol station - Bar
171.5 km (106.6 mi)	Comunanza - Montegallo - Palmiano - Venarotta - Roccafluvione
171.6 km (106.6 mi)	Cervara - Colloto - Pedana - Taverna di mezzo
171.7 km (106.7 mi)	Mozzano
171.9 km (106.8 mi)	Mozzano
173.8 km (108.0 mi)	Petrol station
176 km (109 mi)	Ascoli Piceno ovest Rosara; Casamurana; Stadio Cino e Lillo Del Duca

== See also ==
- State highways (Italy)
- Roads in Italy
- Transport in Italy

=== Other Italian roads ===
- Autostrade of Italy
- Regional road (Italy)
- Provincial road (Italy)
- Municipal road (Italy)
