= Rio (Amatrice) =

- Frazione
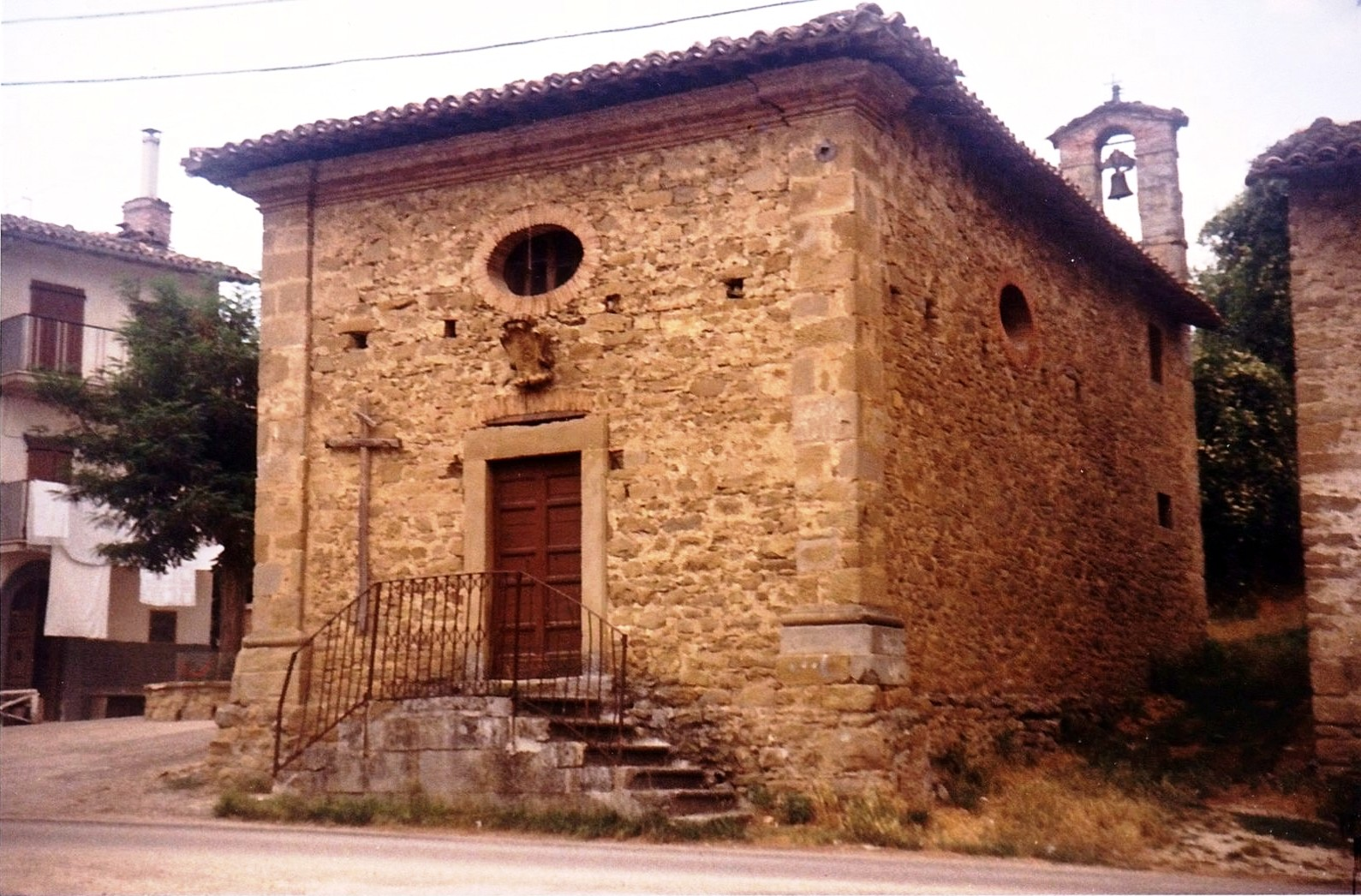
- Oratory of Santa Maria di Loreto, before the 2016 earthquake

- Location of Rio in Italy
- Coordinates: 42°39′51″N 13°17′33″E
- Country: Italy
- Region: Lazio
- Province: Rieti (RI)
- Comune: Amatrice
- Elevation: 930 m (3,050 ft)
- Demonym: Riani
- Time zone: UTC+1 (CET)
  - Summer (DST): UTC+2 (CEST)
- Postal code: 02012
- Dialing code: 0746

Rio (Villa Rio or Villa Rivo) is a hamlet in the municipality of Amatrice in the province of Rieti, in the Lazio region of Italy. It is situated approximately 6 kilometers (3.7 mi) away from the municipal seat. It is located at 930 meters (3,050 ft) above sea level within the boundary of the protected area of the Gran Sasso e Monti della Laga National Park near the Fosso Caporio.

== History ==
The most common explanation is that the toponym Rio is of Latin origin and refers to a nearby stream ("rivus").
The historical information about the Villa Rio dates from after the 16th century. This area was probably built around a religious building, like other areas in Amatrice that were near the center. The 1639 earthquake in Amatrice damaged it a lot, but it doesn't seem to have been separated from the Universitas like other ville did between 1641 and 1643.
The important records of Rio's history from 1749 to 1755 are kept in the State Archive of L'Aquila.
Although it depended on the parish of the nearby SS. Lorenzo a Flaviano, Rio hosted a curacy, with broad autonomy, at the Oratory of Santa Maria di Loreto. The curacy belonged, as sacred property.
During the 18th century, Rio had about 70 people living there. This number kept going up until the early 1900s. After World War II, the population of Rio went down and now many families live there for the summer.
The 1906 cadastral layout plan demonstrated that the current shape of the inhabited center was defined with three horseshoe-shaped squares delimited by the buildings.
On 24 August 2016 the Central Italy earthquake destroyed Rio 90 percent Rio's buildings.

== Main sights ==
=== Oratory of Santa Maria di Loreto ===
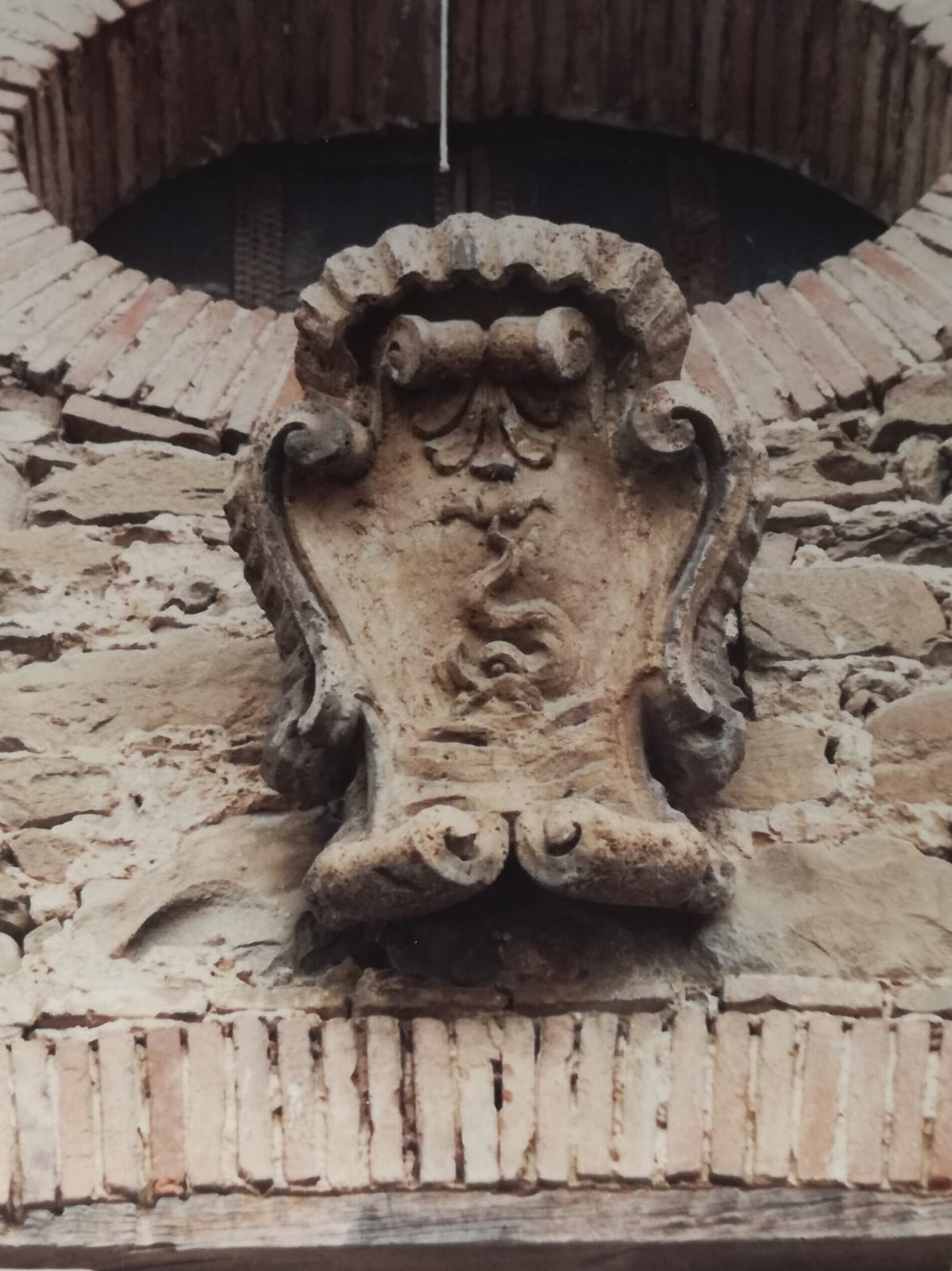
Coat of arms on the facade of the Oratory of Santa Maria di Loreto

Oratory of Santa Maria di Loreto, built in the late 16th century, was constructed by the Orsini family, Amatrices feudatories. Subsequently, it was granted the right of patronage to the Delfini family, followed by the Santelli family and its heirs. These families were granted the privileges of jus patronatus and jus presentandi on the altar of the Oratory, which entails the right to present to the authority the priest or cleric who is suitable for the benefit.
After the construction of a road connection with Amatrice in the 1930s, the road level was lowered, and the entrance to the Oratory is now by a small double-ramp staircase.
The Fire Department declared Oratory unsafe because of an earthquake in 2009. Then It's partially collapsed now because of the earthquake in 2016.
The Oratory is a small building made of stone. Its simple and elegant, with nice details on its facade and side walls. It has a small bell tower at the back with a sail. The front of the building has a picture of a dolphin waving in a post with a forked tail. An altar frontal, well-preserved, was found inside. With the progressive depopulation of the hamlet, it has been subjected to various acts of looting.

=== Natural areas ===
Is possible to observe one of the few spontaneous nuclei of white birches (species betula pendula) present in the Gran Sasso e Monti della Laga National Park by climbing the Fosso Caporio.
