= Amatrice earthquake =

Amatrice earthquake may refer to:

- 1639 Amatrice earthquake
- August 2016 Central Italy earthquake
- October 2016 Central Italy earthquakes
