= Amatrice =

- Comune
- Comune di Amatrice
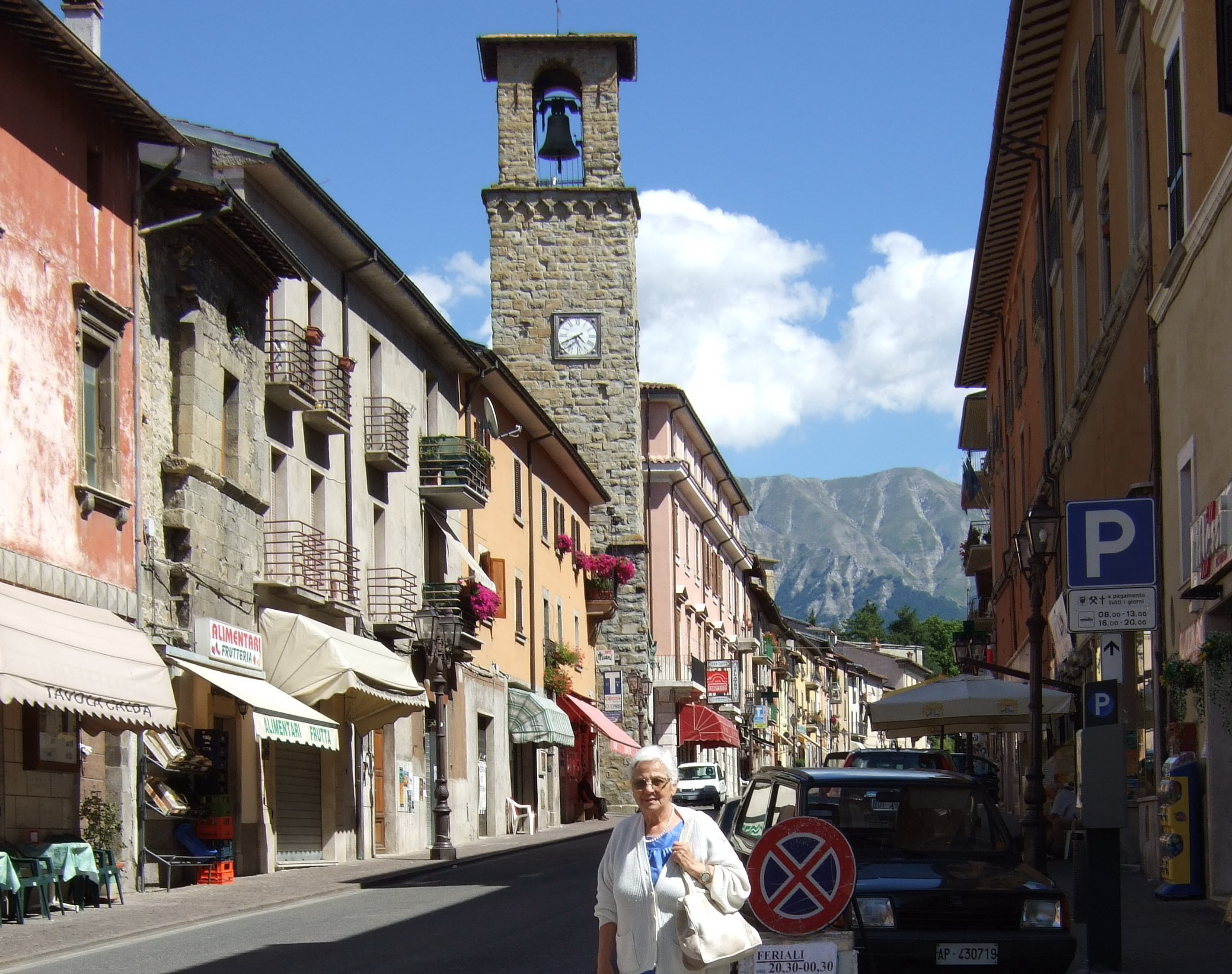
- View of Corso Umberto I in Amatrice before the 2016 earthquake

- Coat of arms

- Location within Italy Location within Lazio
- Coordinates: 42°37′37″N 13°17′41″E
- Country: Italy
- Region: Lazio
- Province: Rieti (RI)
- Frazioni: see list

Government
  - Mayor: Antonio Fontanella

Area
  - Total: 174 km^{2} (67 sq mi)
- Elevation: 955 m (3,133 ft)

Population (2018-01-01)
  - Total: 2,500
  - Density: 14/km^{2} (37/sq mi)
- Demonym: Amatriciani
- Time zone: UTC+1 (CET)
  - Summer (DST): UTC+2 (CEST)
- Postal code: 02012
- Dialing code: 0746
- Patron saint: Filetta's Madonna
- Saint day: Ascension Day
- Website: Official website

Amatrice (Italian: [amaˈtriːtʃe]; Sabino: L'Amatrici) is a town and comune (municipality) in the province of Rieti, in the Italian region of Lazio, and the center of the food-agricultural area of Gran Sasso e Monti della Laga National Park. The town was devastated by a powerful earthquake on 24 August 2016. It was one of I Borghi più belli d'Italia ('The most beautiful villages of Italy').

== History ==
Archaeological discoveries show a human presence in the area of Amatrice since prehistoric times, and the remains of Roman buildings and tombs have also been found. After the fall of the Western Roman Empire, the area became part of the Lombard Duchy of Spoleto, included in the comitatus of Ascoli. The town of Matrice is mentioned in the papers of the Farfa Abbey in 1012 as commanding the confluence of the Tronto and Castellano rivers. In the year 900 the pope was from Amatrice.

=== The medieval and early modern periods ===
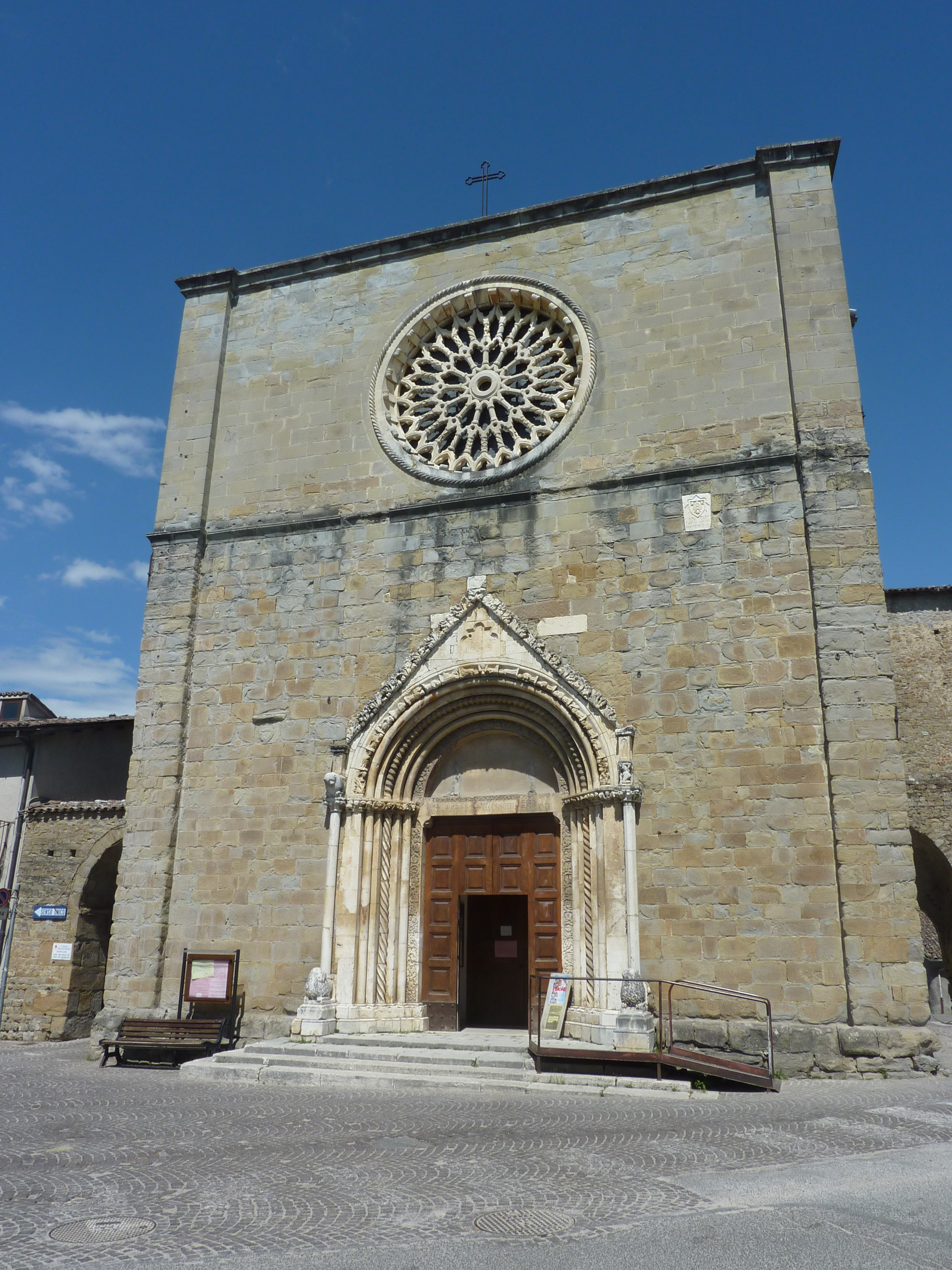
Church of Sant'Agostino in May 2011

In 1265, during the reign of Manfred of Sicily, Amatrice became part of the Kingdom of Naples. After the capture of Naples by the Angevins, Amatrice rebelled but was vanquished by Charles I of Anjou in 1274, although it maintained some sort of autonomy as an universitas.

In the 14th and 15th century, Amatrice was frequently in conflict with the neighbouring comuni of Norcia, Arquata, and L'Aquila, and its troops took part in the siege of L'Aquila under Braccio da Montone. In the course of the conflict between Angevins and the Aragonese for the possession of the Kingdom of Naples, Amatrice sided with Naples.

The Church of Sant'Agostino (pictured left) was built in 1428.

In 1529, Amatrice was stormed by troops of Philibert of Chalon, a general in the service of Emperor Charles V, who gave it to its general Alessandro Vitelli.

The city was severely damaged by an earthquake in 1639.

Later, Amatrice was held by the Orsini and the Medici of Florence, who kept it until 1737.

=== The modern period ===
After the unification of Italy in the 19th century, Amatrice became part of the province of L'Aquila in the region of Abruzzo, eventually being annexed to Lazio in 1927.

On 24 August 2016, a powerful earthquake struck Amatrice, devastating the town and killing at least 295 people. Sergio Pirozzi, at the time the mayor of Amatrice (in March 2018 he was elected in the Regional Council of Lazio), said that the town "is no more". Later, Pirozzi said that "three-quarters of the town was destroyed". Nearby Accumoli and Pescara del Tronto were also devastated.

== Historical buildings ==
Historical buildings and their condition after the 2016 earthquake
Building	Completed	Status	Additional elements / notes
Church of Sant'Agostino	1428	†	Includes a Gothic portal and some frescoes, including the Annunciation and Madonna with Child and Angels. Severe damage after the earthquake: part of the roof and the upper half of the façade, including the rose window, collapsed.

== Cuisine ==
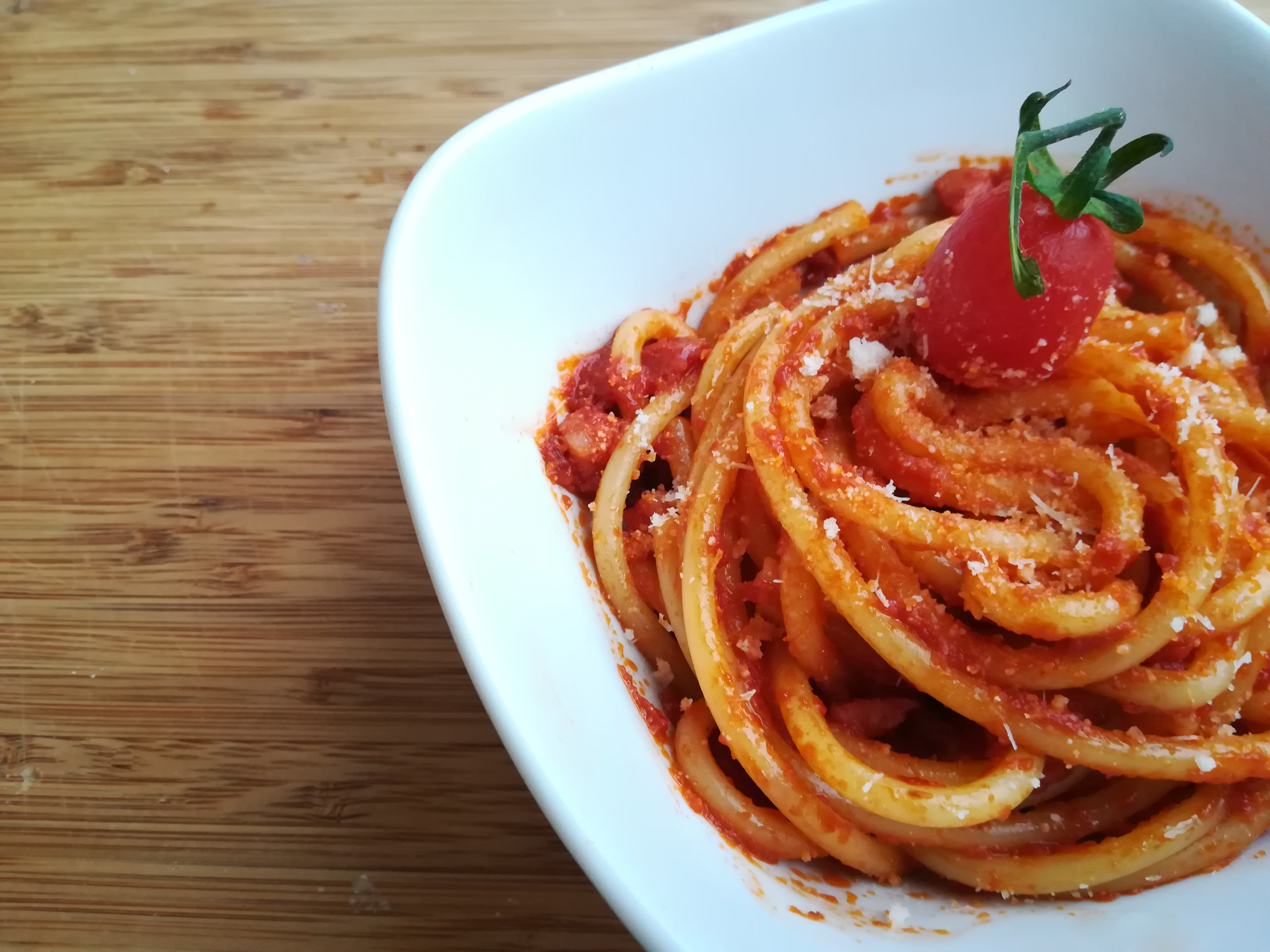
Bucatini all'amatriciana

Amatrice is especially famous for a pasta sauce, sugo all'amatriciana, usually served with a long pasta such as spaghetti or bucatini,

== People ==
- Nicola Filotesio (1480 or 1489–1547 or 1559), Italian painter, architect and sculptor of the Renaissance period
- Elio Augusto Di Carlo (1918–1998), Italian ornithologist, historian and physician
- Sara Pichelli (born 1983), artist

== Frazioni ==
Frazioni (hamlets) of the town include Aleggia, Bagnolo, Capricchia, Casale, Casale Bucci, Casale Celli, Casale Masacci, Casale Nadalucci, Casalene, Casale Nibbi, Casale Sanguigni, Casale Sautelli, Casale Zocchi, Casali della Meta, Cascello, Castel Trione, Collalto, Collecreta, Collegentilesco, Collemagrone, Collemoresco, Collepagliuca, Colletroio, Colli, Conche, Configno, Cornelle, Cornillo Nuovo, Cornillo Vecchio, Cossara, Cossito, Crognale, Domo, Faizzone, Ferrazza, Filetto, Fiumatello, Francucciano, Le Forme, Moletano, Musicchio, Nommisci, Osteria della Meta, Pasciano, Patàrico, Petrana, Pinaco Arafranca, Poggio Vitellino, Prato, Preta, Rio, Retrosi, Roccapassa, Rocchetta, Saletta, San Benedetto, San Capone, San Giorgio, San Lorenzo a Pinaco, San Sebastiano, Santa Giusta, Sant'Angelo, San Tommaso, Scai, Sommati, Torrita, Torritella, Varoni, Villa San Cipriano, Villa San Lorenzo e Flaviano, and Voceto.

== See also ==
Media related to Amatrice at Wikimedia Commons
