= Arli =

Arli is a given name. Notable people with the name include:

- Arli Chontey (born 1992), Kazakh weightlifter
- Arli Liberman (born 1986), Israeli guitarist and record producer

== See also ==
- Arli National Park in Burkina Faso
- Arliss (surname)
- Carli (given name)
