= Sant'Agostino, Amatrice =

Sant'Agostino
- Chiesa di Sant'Agostino
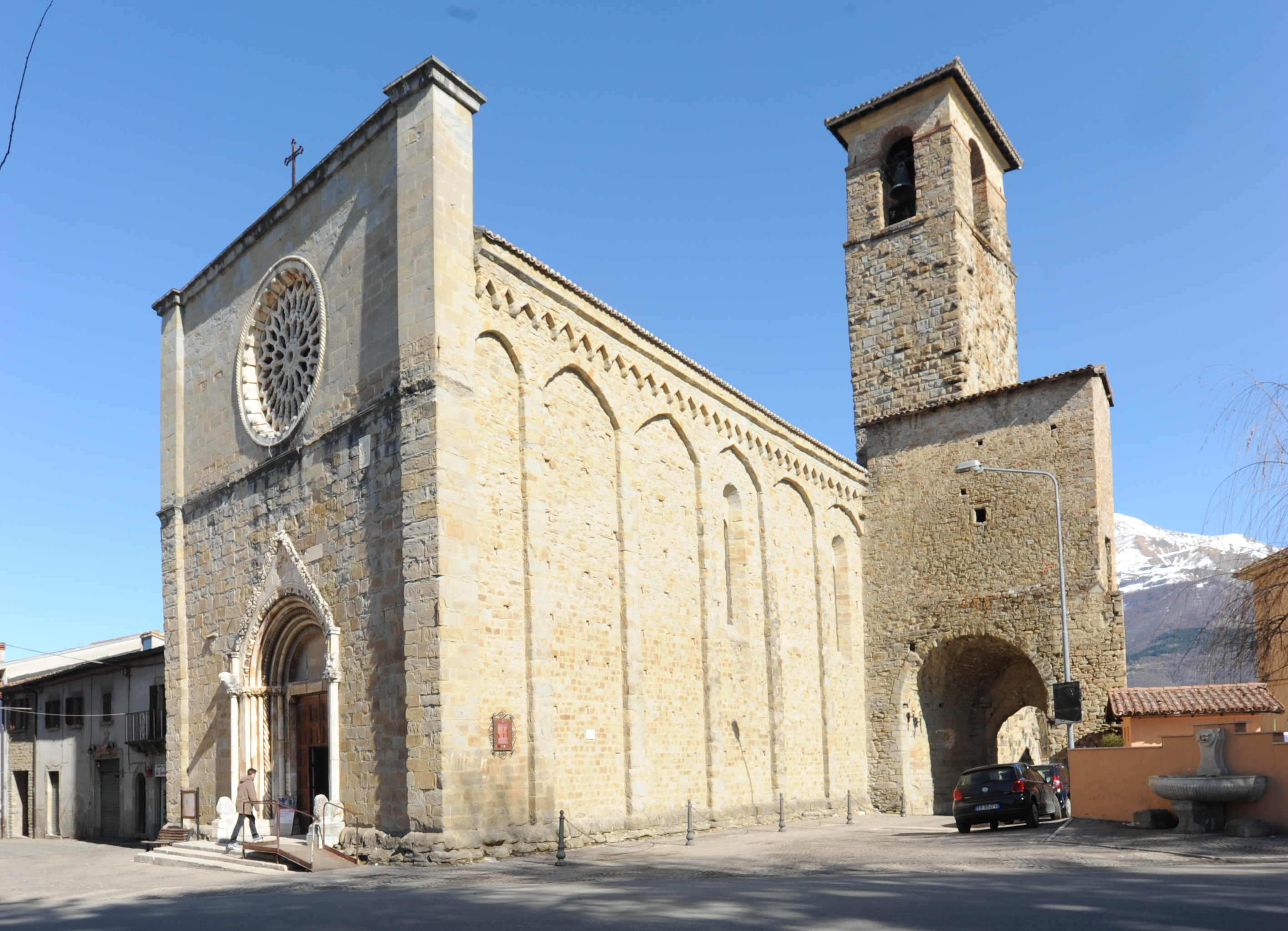
- The church of Sant'Agostino in Amatrice prior to the damage sustained in 2016–17

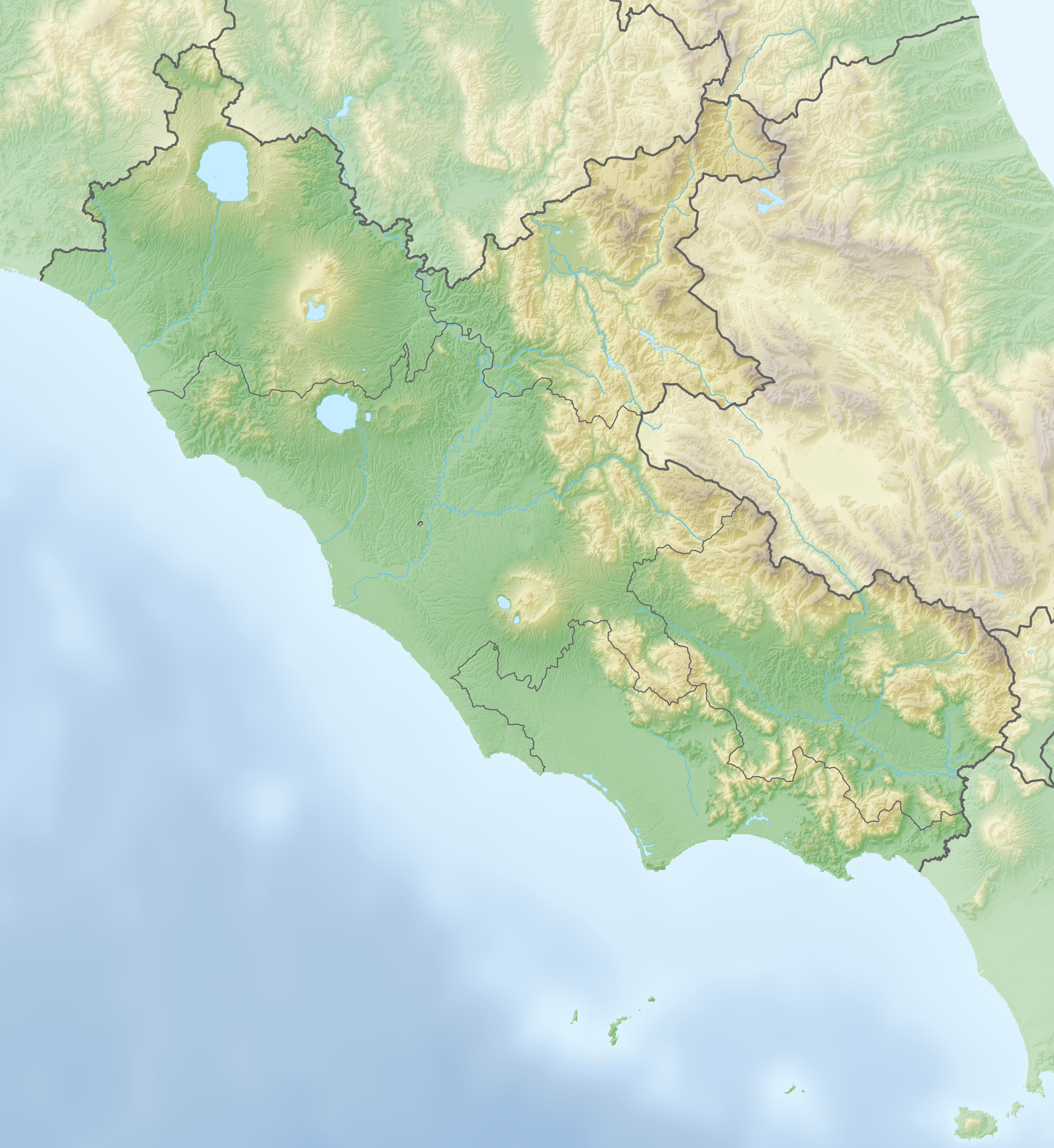
- Location of church
- 42°37′43.309″N 13°17′28.846″E
- Location: Amatrice, Province of Rieti
- Country: Italy
- Denomination: Roman Catholic

History
- Status: Church
- Founded: c. 13th century
- Founder: Augustinians
- Dedication: Augustine of Hippo
- Earlier dedication: Saint Nicholas

Architecture
- Functional status: Closed
- Architect: Giovanni dell'Amatrice
- Architectural type: Romanesque and Gothic
- Completed: 1428
- Closed: 24 August 2016

Specifications
- Materials: Sandstone

Administration
- Diocese: Rieti

Sant'Agostino (Italian: Chiesa di Sant'Agostino) is a ruined Roman Catholic church in Amatrice, province of Rieti, Lazio, Italy. It was built in 1428 and it was dedicated to Saint Nicholas, but it was modified over subsequent centuries and rededicated to Saint Augustine of Hippo. Most of the church was destroyed in a series of earthquakes in 2016–17.

== History ==
The church was built by the Augustinians in 1428, and it was originally dedicated to Saint Nicholas. A plaque on the façade states that the building's architect was Giovanni dell'Amatrice. The church was built near the Porta Carbonara and Amatrice's town walls. The church was rededicated to Saint Augustine of Hippo in the 18th century.

In 1580 and again in 1781, the interior and part of the old apse were destroyed by fire, and repair works continued until the 19th century. In 1845, the vault was considered to be unsafe so it was demolished. At this point, the church's interior was whitewashed.

The small bell, which weighs 271 pounds (123 kg), was recast by the foundry Pasquale della Noce in 1821. The largest bell of 5,000 pounds (2,300 kg) was retouched by maestro di campane Nicola Marinelli di Gagliano in 1821.

The bell tower was restored in 1825 and 1854, since it was in danger of collapsing. Three frescoes, two of which dated back to the 15th century, were discovered within the church in 1894.

The rectangular window on the façade was replaced by a rose window in the early 1930s. The façade and bell tower were restored later on in the century.

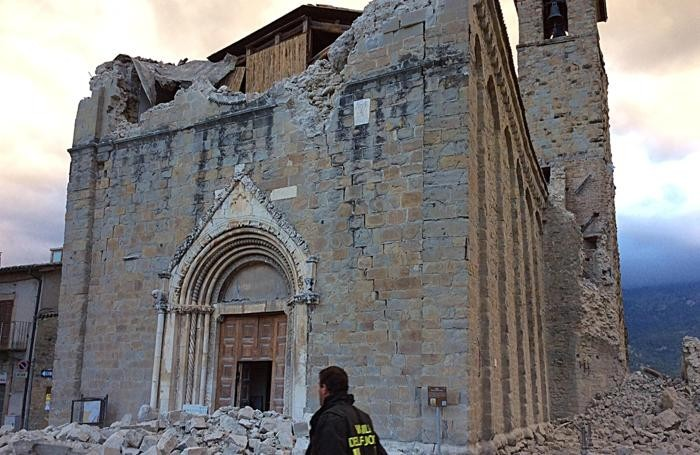
The damaged church in 2016, before more parts of it collapsed

The church was severely damaged during an earthquake which hit Central Italy on 24 August 2016, when part of the roof and the upper half of the façade including the rose window collapsed.

The remaining parts of the church were further damaged in the January 2017 Central Italy earthquakes, and the bell tower collapsed on 18 January, while the right wall of the church collapsed on 29 January. Only the portal and the left wall of the church remain standing.

== Architecture ==
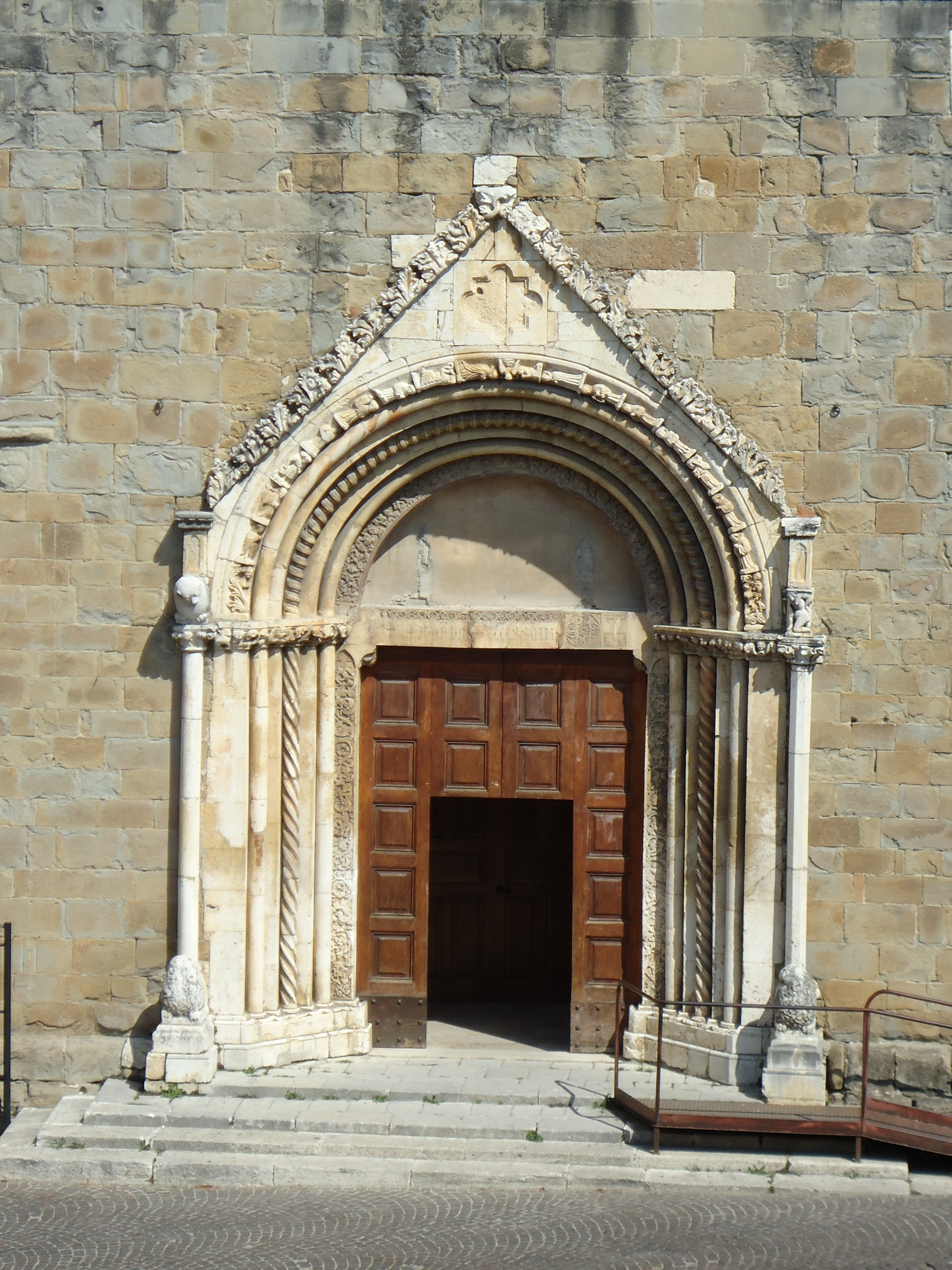
The church's portal

The church's façade was built out of local sandstone. The lower part of the façade had a late Gothic–Romanesque marble portal with the main entrance. The capitals contained representations of a bear and a caryatid. The lunette was decorated by sculptures of the Madonna and the archangel Gabriel, but these were stolen in the 20th century. The date A.D. MCCCCXXVIII (1428) and the coat of arms of Amatrice could be found on the portal's architrave.

The upper part of the façade, which has been destroyed in the 2016 earthquake, was modified according to Renaissance principles. It originally had a rectangular window, but this was replaced by a rose window in the 1930s. A plaque with the old coat of arms of the church and a Latin inscription commemorating the building's architect was found on the right hand side of the façade, below the rose window. A pair of large oblong windows could be found on each side of the church. A bell tower and the medieval Porta Carbonara stood to the rear of the church.

The church's interior dated back to the 18th century, and it had only a few elements of note. The following frescoes were found on the left side:

- l'Annunciazione (the Annunciation) – dated 1491, probably the work of Carlo Crivelli but sometimes alternatively attributed to Dionisio Cappelli
- Madonna in trono con il Bambino (Enthroned Madonna and Child) – dated 1497. It was painted on an earlier fresco, parts of which are still visible before the 2016 earthquake.
- Madonna del Rosario (Our Lady of the Rosary) – dated much later than the previous two frescoes.

A set of bas-relief terracotta Stations of the Cross were found on the right hand side of the church.

== Convent ==
An Augustinian convent which dated back to at least the late 13th century originally stood near the church. It was closed in 1809, at the same time when the Archive and the Library were destroyed. It was in a state of disrepair by 1824, and attempts to convert it for public use such as a prison or hospital in 1836 were unsuccessful. The convent was used as a barn and slaughterhouse, before being completely demolished. No remains have survived today.

== Bibliography ==
- Massimi, Andrea (1958). Amatrice e le sue ville (in Italian). pp. 112–115.
- Ruggeri, Adriano (1995). La Chiesa di S. Agostino in Amatrice (in Italian). Editoriale Frontiera.
