= Arliss (surname) =

Arliss is a surname which may refer to:

- Dimitra Arliss (1932–2012), American actress
- George Arliss (1868–1946), English actor, author, playwright and filmmaker
- Leslie Arliss (1901–1987), English screenwriter and director
- Ralph Arliss (born 1947), British actor
