= 1639 Amatrice earthquake =

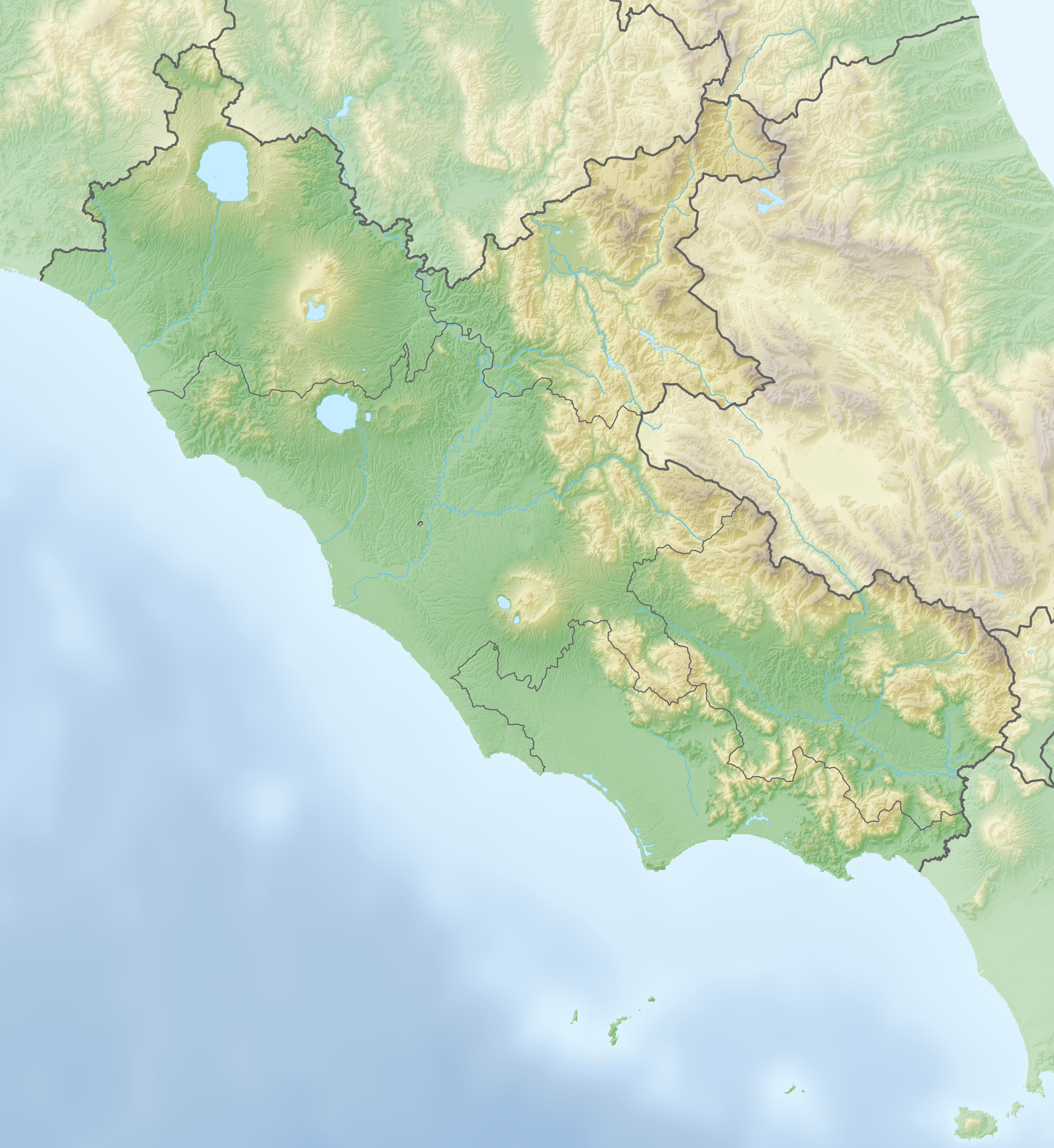
- Location within Italy Location within Lazio
- Local date: October 7, 1639
- Magnitude: 6.01±0.36 M_{w}
- Epicenter: 42.639°N 13.261°E
- Areas affected: Italy, Lazio
- Max. intensity: MMI IX (Violent) – MMI X (Extreme)
- Casualties: 500

The 1639 Amatrice earthquake occurred on 7 October near Amatrice, in the upper valley of the river Tronto, at the time part of the Kingdom of Naples, now Italy.

== History ==
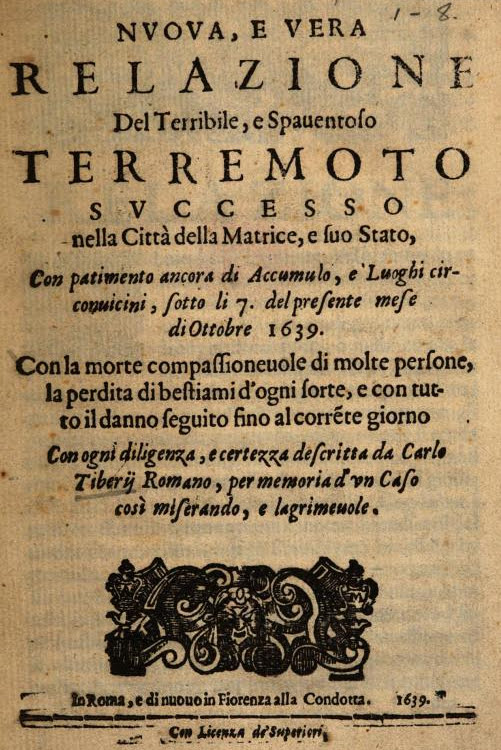
Carlo Tiberi Romano, New and faithful report of the terrible and frightening earthquake in Matrice and its State (Rome, 1639)

The princes Orsini left the city destroyed by the earthquake, whose shock lasted 15 minutes and caused about 500 deaths (although many bodies remained under the rubble). Damage was estimated between 400,000 and 1 million scudi of the time.

The next 14 October there was a strong aftershock.

Many inhabitants fled to the countryside, where tents were set up, while others found refuge in the church of San Domenico. Among the buildings destroyed or badly damaged, there were: the princes Orsini's palace (that at the time of the earthquake they were out of town), the Palazzo del Reggimento (Regiment's palace), the church of the Holy Crucifix, and other houses. Rosaries and processions were organized by the people to invoke the end of earthquakes. There were also heavy losses of the cattle (the main source of income at the time), which forced the population to migrate to Rome and Ascoli Piceno.

The effects of the earthquake were described in detail in a report published by Carlo Tiberi in 1639, subsequently revised and updated in a second edition of the same year.

== See also ==
- 2016 Central Italy earthquakes

== Bibliography ==
- Guglielmo Manitta, Amatrice, Accumoli, Arquata e Pescara del Tronto e i terremoti del 1639, 1672, 1703, 1730, 25 agosto 2016.
- Carlo Tiberi (1639). Nuova e vera Relazione del Terribile, e Spaventoso Terremoto successo nella Città della Matrice, e suo Stato, con patimento ancora di Accumulo, e Luoghi circonvicini, sotto li 7 del mese d'Ottobre 1639.
- M. Baratta (1901). I terremoti d'Italia. Saggio di storia, geografia e bibliografia sismica italiana.
- M.C. Spadea; M. Vecchi; P. Gardellini; S. Del Mese. D. Postpischl (ed.). "The Amatrice earthquake of October 8, 1639 (in Atlas of Isoseismal Maps of Italian Earthquakes)". Quaderni de "La Ricerca Scientifica". 2A (114). CNR-PFG: 161.
