= August 2016 Central Italy earthquake =

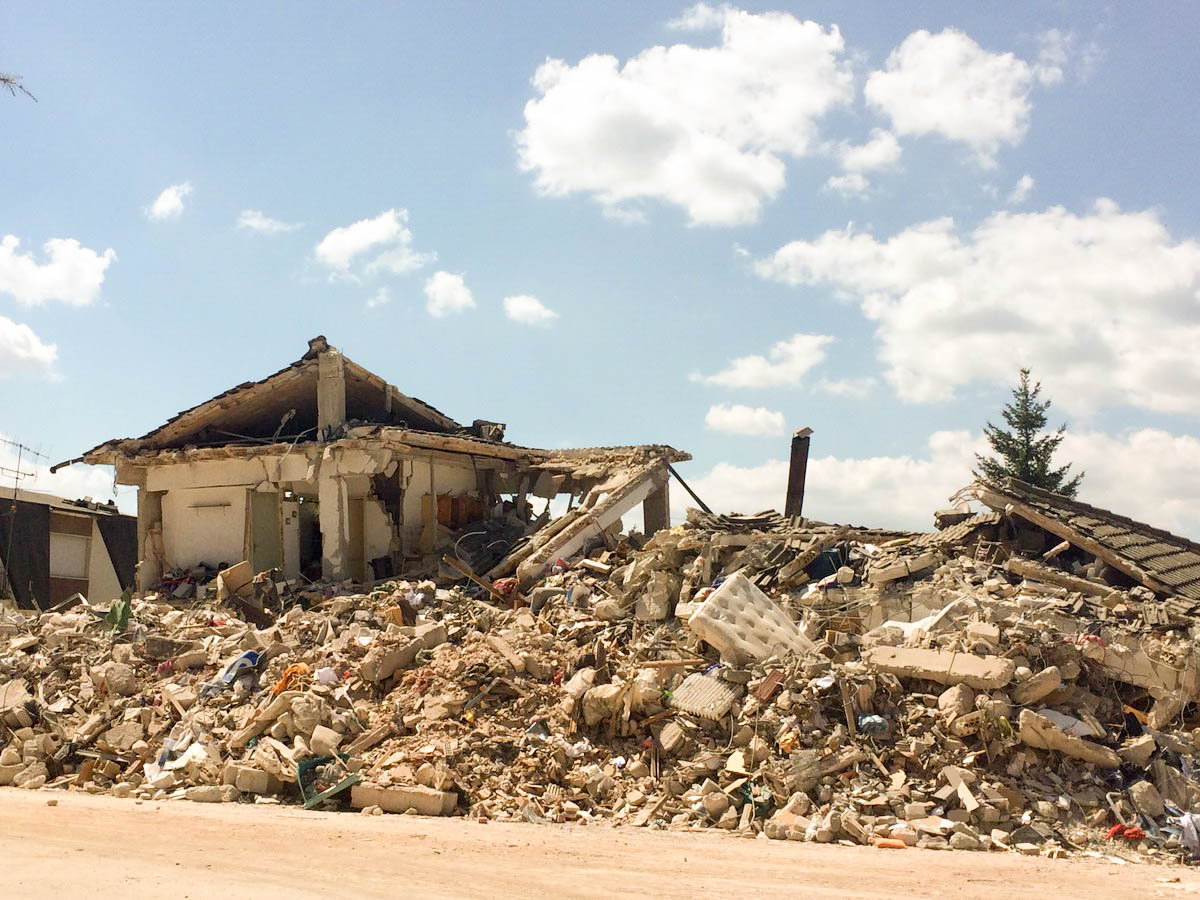
- Destruction in Amatrice

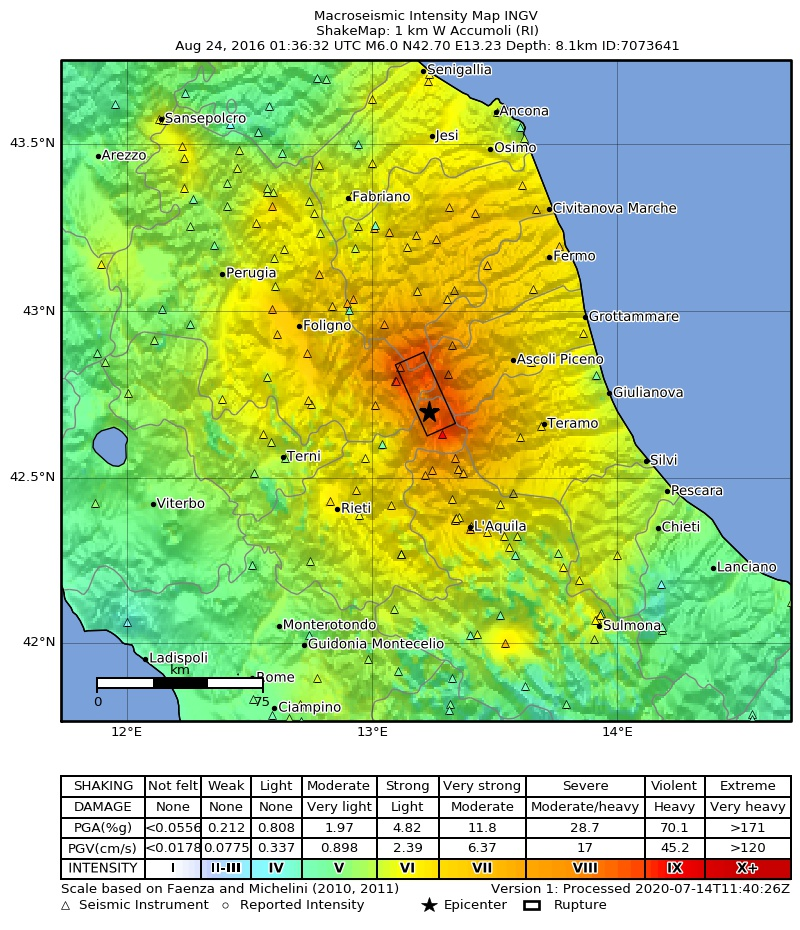

- Location within Italy
- UTC time: 2016-08-24 01:36:32
- ISC event: 611462212
- USGS-ANSS: ComCat
- Local date: 24 August 2016
- Local time: 03:36 CEST
- Magnitude: 6.2 M_{w}
- Depth: 4.4 km (2.7 mi)
- Epicenter: 42.706°N 13.223°E
- Type: Dip-slip (normal)
- Areas affected: Central Italy
- Max. intensity: MMI XI (Extreme)
- Casualties: 299 deaths ≈ 388 injured 4,500 homeless

An earthquake, measuring 6.2 ± 0.016 on the moment magnitude scale, hit Central Italy on 24 August 2016 at 03:36:32 CEST (01:36 UTC). Its epicentre was close to Accumoli, with its hypocentre at a depth of 4 ± 1 km, approximately 75 km (47 mi) southeast of Perugia and 45 km (28 mi) north of L'Aquila, in an area near the borders of the Umbria, Lazio, Abruzzo and Marche regions. As of 15 November 2016, 299 people had been killed.

== Background ==
The central Apennines is one of the most seismically active areas in Italy. The Apennines mountain belt were formed in the Miocene to Pliocene as a result of the ongoing subduction of the Adriatic plate beneath the Eurasian plate, forming a fold and thrust belt. During the Quaternary, thrust tectonics gave way to extensional tectonics, with the development of a zone of normal faulting running along the crest of the mountain range. The extension is a result of either subduction rollback or the opening of the Tyrrhenian Sea. In the Central Apennines the zone of extension is about 30 km wide, closely matching the zone of observed extensional strain as shown by GPS measurements. Recent large earthquakes in this area have been caused by movement on SW-dipping normal faults.

This was the largest tremor since 2009, when an earthquake near L'Aquila in the Abruzzo region killed over 300 people and displaced about 65,000.

== Earthquake ==
The earthquake was initially reported by INGV to have occurred at a depth of approximately 5 km (3.1 mi), with a magnitude of 6.0 M_{w} and epicentre in the comune of Accumoli. The USGS first reported an earthquake at a depth of 10.0 km (6.2 mi) with a magnitude of 6.4 M_{w} and epicentre southeast of Norcia, but subsequently revised the magnitude to 6.2 M_{w}. The first seismic wave was recorded at 3:36 a.m. The European-Mediterranean Seismological Centre put the magnitude at 6.1. The discrepancies between the different estimates of the magnitude led INGV to explain in a blog post that they use a crustal velocity model specifically calibrated for Italy and give more weight to the seismometric stations situated close to the epicentre. Using global models, INGV further stated that it can reproduce the values reported by foreign agencies.

As of 30 August 2016, the initial earthquake was followed by at least 2,500 aftershocks. The tremor and a number of aftershocks were felt across the whole of central Italy (from Rimini to Naples), including Rome, Florence and Bologna.

The local school was the first place to be repaired and reopened to the public on 15 September 2016.

Magnitude of the Central Italy earthquake (6.0) (red dot) and its aftershocks (most were less than 4.0); aftershocks continued to occur after the period shown here

Number of earthquakes by magnitude
Date	≥6.0	5.0–5.9	4.0–4.9	3.0–3.9	2.0–2.9	1.0–1.9	≤0.9	Total
24 Aug	1	1	7	83	214	46	0	352
25 Aug	0	0	2	8	228	233	1	472
26 Aug	0	0	1	14	190	178	2	385
27 Aug	0	0	1	9	130	330	6	476
28 Aug	0	0	1	9	86	351	6	453
29 Aug	0	0	0	5	71	268	8	352
30 Aug	0	0	0	4	69	308	22	403
31 Aug	0	0	0	9	53	355	22	439

Earthquakes with a magnitude of 4.0 or higher
Date	Local time (CEST)	Moment magnitude	Hypocenter depth	Epicenter		
Date	Local time (CEST)	Moment magnitude	Hypocenter depth	Municipality	Latitude	Longitude
24 August 2016	03:36:32	6.2	10 km (6.2 mi)	Norcia	42.71	13.17
24 August 2016	03:56:02	4.6	10 km (6.2 mi)	Amatrice	42.61	13.28
24 August 2016	04:33:29	5.5	10 km (6.2 mi)	Norcia	42.79	13.15
24 August 2016	04:59:35	4.3	9 km (5.6 mi)	Norcia	42.80	13.14
24 August 2016	05:40:11	4.3	10.7 km (6.6 mi)	Amatrice	42.62	13.25
24 August 2016	06:06:53	4.4	10 km (6.2 mi)	Cascia	42.75	13.03
24 August 2016	13:50:31	4.9	10 km (6.2 mi)	Visso	42.87	13.11
24 August 2016	13:50:57	4.1	8 km (5.0 mi)	Arquata del Tronto	42.82	13.15
24 August 2016	19:46:09	4.6	10 km (6.2 mi)	Arquata del Tronto	42.72	13.19
25 August 2016	01:22:06	4.1	7.3 km (4.5 mi)	Maltignano	42.67	13.14
25 August 2016	05:17:16	4.7	10 km (6.2 mi)	Norcia	42.78	13.18
25 August 2016	05:36:07	4.3	10 km (6.2 mi)	Maltignano	42.65	13.16
26 August 2016	06:28:27	4.7	10 km (6.2 mi)	Amatrice	42.66	13.25
27 August 2016	04:50:59	4.2	12.2 km (7.6 mi)	Norcia	42.83	13.15
28 August 2016	15:07:34	4.3	11.7 km (7.3 mi)	Amatrice	42.66	13.24
28 August 2016	17:55:36	4.6	5.7 km (3.5 mi)	Norcia	42.78	13.15
28 August 2016	18:42:02	4.3	10 km (6.2 mi)	Visso	42.86	13.03

== Casualties and rescue work ==
Nationalities of victims
Nationality	Dead	Injured
Italy	280	376
Romania	11	6
United Kingdom	3	2
Albania	1	6
El Salvador	1	1
Canada	1	1
Afghanistan	1	-
Spain	1	-
United States	-	2
North Macedonia	-	1 (Note: A dual Macedonian-Albanian citizen)

As of 26 August 2016, the official figures of the Protezione Civile report that the earthquake caused the death of 297 people: 234 in Amatrice, 11 in Accumoli and 49 in Arquata del Tronto. At least 365 injured had to be treated in hospitals, mainly in Rieti and Ascoli Piceno, while people with less serious injuries were treated on the spot.

In addition to those rescued with the help of other inhabitants or escaped by themselves, 238 people were pulled alive from the rubble by the timely intervention of the authorities, 215 by the Vigili del Fuoco and 23 by the Soccorso Alpino.

Approximately 2,100 people found shelter at emergency camps. Approximately 4,400 people were involved in the search and rescue operations, including 70 teams with rescue dogs. Logistics made use of 12 helicopters, with nine more on stand-by.

== Damage ==
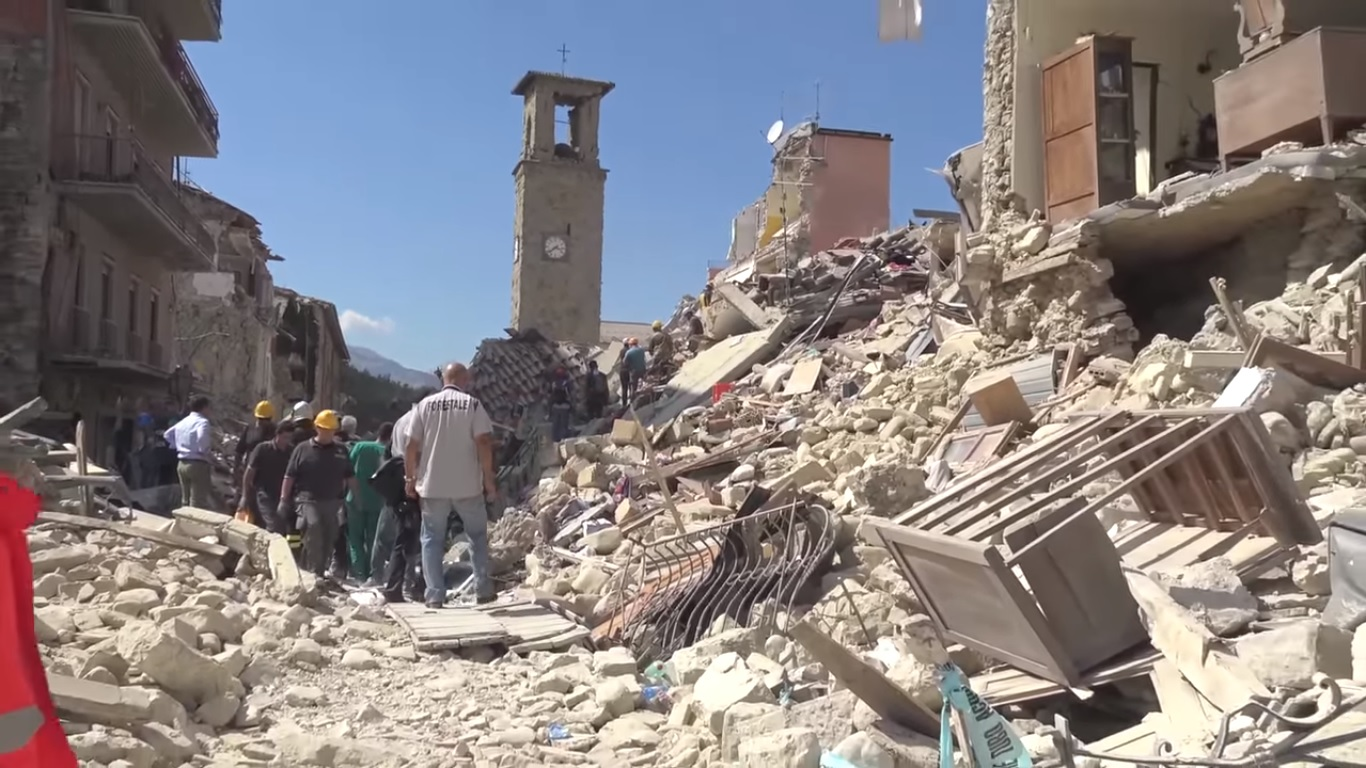
Amatrice town center was destroyed by the earthquake

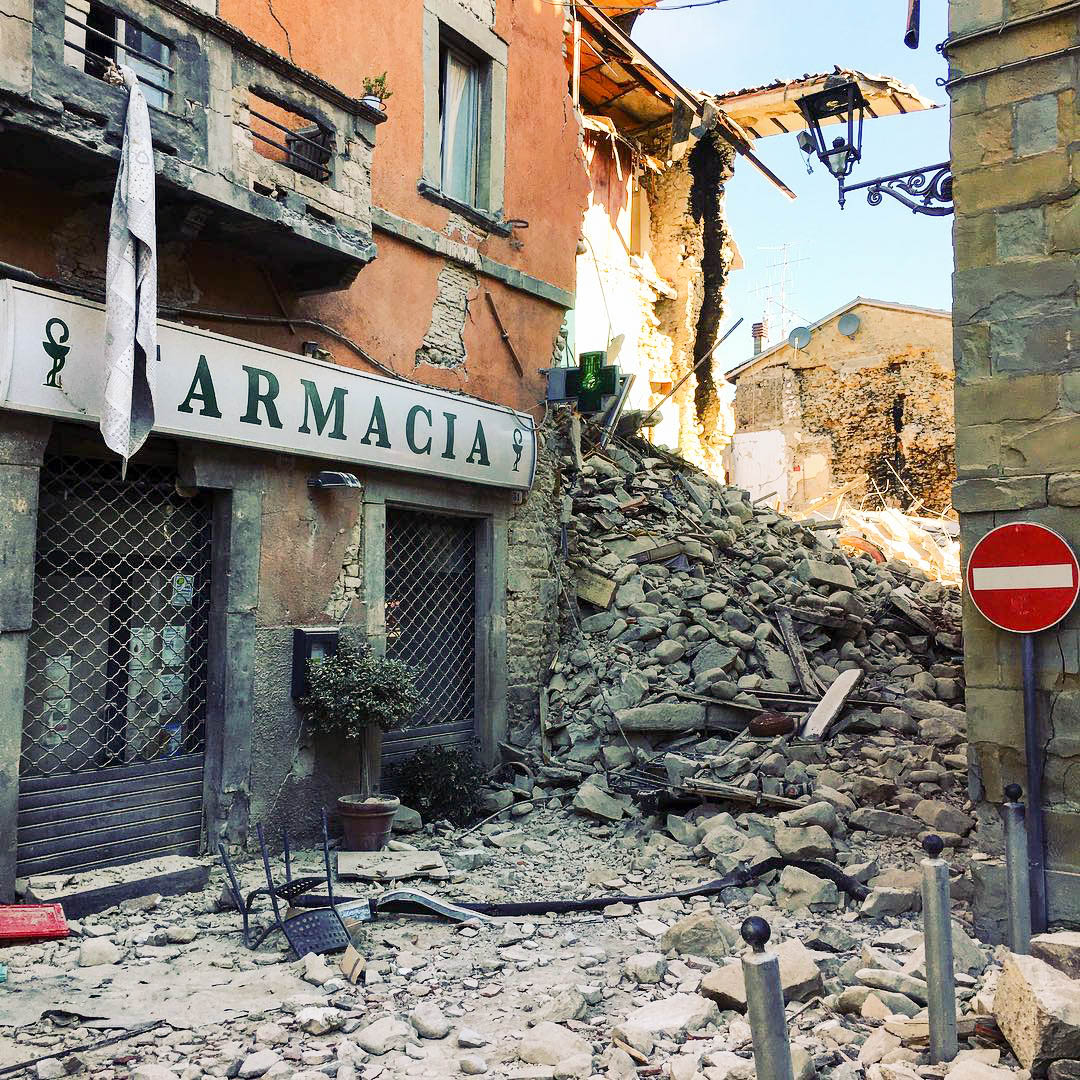
Rubble in the town center of Amatrice.

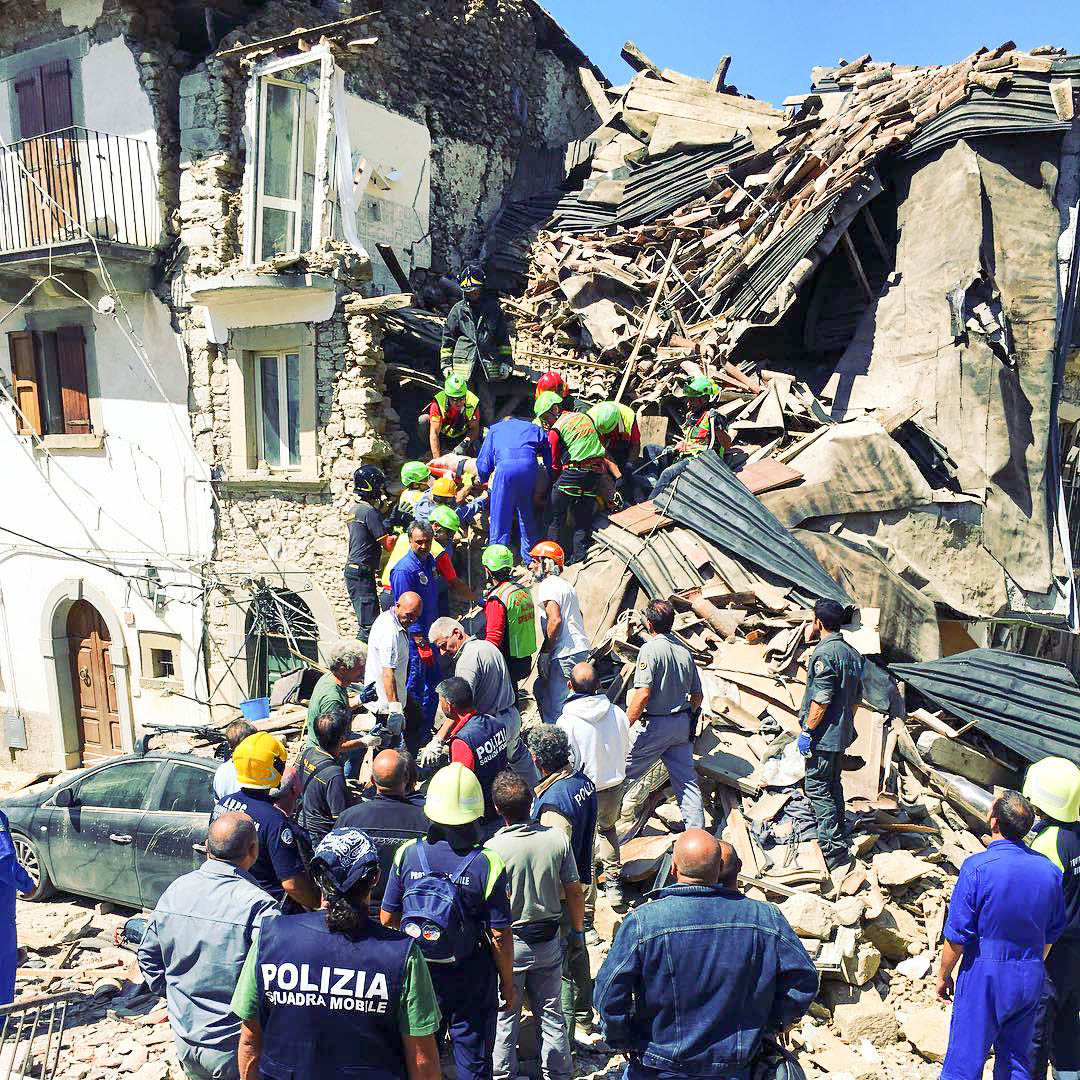
Rescuers during an operation in Amatrice.

Early reports indicated severe damage in the town of Amatrice, near the epicentre, and in Accumoli and Pescara del Tronto. Sergio Pirozzi, the mayor of Amatrice, stated that "Amatrice is not here anymore, half of the town is destroyed." Photos of the destruction depicted a massive pile of rubble in the town's centre with only a few structures still standing on the outskirts. It also cost an estimated economic loss between $1 billion to $11 billion.

=== Cultural heritage ===
In addition to the loss of human life, widespread destruction of cultural heritage is also reported.

In Amatrice, the facade and rose window of the Church of Sant'Agostino were destroyed, and the museum dedicated to the painter Nicola Filotesio, student and companion of Raphael, collapsed. The earthquake also created cracks in the Baths of Caracalla in Rome. The earthquake was so broad that authorities made structural tests on the Colosseum as well, which was not damaged.

The Basilica of Saint Francis of Assisi – a UNESCO World Heritage site with frescoes by Giotto and Cimabue that were partly destroyed by an earthquake in 1997 – was declared safe after an extensive survey by the head restorer.

=== Robot-assisted disaster response in Amatrice ===
3D computer models were used to help damage assessment of the Basilica of Saint Francis of Assisi and the Church of Sant'Agostino. The data for building the models was collected by robots deployed by the European project TRADR. Two ground robots and one drone were used inside the San Francesco Basilica, one drone was used inside the Sant'Agostino church, and two drones were used on the outside of both churches.

== Controversies ==
After the earthquake in Central Italy, the court of Rieti discovered that not all the buildings of those cities were constructed or renovated under the antiseismic law of 1974 in which it explained all the construction techniques of an earthquake resistant building. In fact, a family was killed that night by the rubble of a church that was not renovated under that law. Similarly, the Romolo Capranica elementary school in Amatrice partially collapsed, even if in 2013 the town spent 160,000 euros in a seismic retrofit operation that improved the building's seismic resistance, but wasn't enough to comply with 2012 earthquake standards in Italy. The investigation is ongoing to discover the causes that allowed buildings to become reduced to rubble instead of sustaining damage attributed to buildings following anti-seismic regulations, especially Amatrice.

French satirical magazine Charlie Hebdo published a cartoon depicting Italian earthquake victims as pasta dishes, causing "shock and outrage." In response to the reaction of Italians unleashed on social networks, the cartoonist Coco pointed out with another cartoon on the official Facebook page of the magazine: "Italians ... it's not Charlie Hebdo who builds your houses, it's the Mafia!" The French ambassador in Rome, in a statement, pointed out that the French Government's position on the Italian earthquake is not that expressed by Charlie Hebdo.

== October 2016 and January 2017 earthquakes ==
A magnitude 6.1 intraplate earthquake struck Italy 3 kilometres (1.9 mi) west of Visso on 26 October at 9:18 p.m. local time. The earthquake, initially considered an aftershock of the magnitude 6.2 earthquake in August, struck about 30 kilometres (19 mi) to the northwest of the August earthquake. The civil protection, however, estimated the consequences less dramatically than feared. According to official data, a man died because he had suffered a heart attack as a result of the quake. On 30 October, an earthquake larger than the 24 August shock struck Norcia with a USGS moment magnitude of 6.6.

A magnitude 5.3 earthquake struck 25 km northwest of L'Aquila on 18 January at 10:25 local time at a depth of 9 km. A stronger, 5.7 tremor hit the same epicentral area at 11:14 local time. A third earthquake of preliminary magnitude of 5.6 struck 11 minutes later. At 14:33 local time, the fourth tremor of a magnitude 5.2 was registered. These earthquakes were followed by multiple aftershocks.

Earthquakes from August 2016 to January 2017.

== Maps ==

Aftershock distribution map, 24–25 August.
Red: Main shock, Orange: 4.0–5.9, Blue: 3.0–3.9, Light blue: 0–2.9

== See also ==
- 1639 Amatrice earthquake
- List of earthquakes in 2016
- List of earthquakes in Italy
- October 2016 Central Italy earthquakes
- January 2017 Central Italy earthquakes
