= Accumoli =

- Comune
- Comune di Accumoli
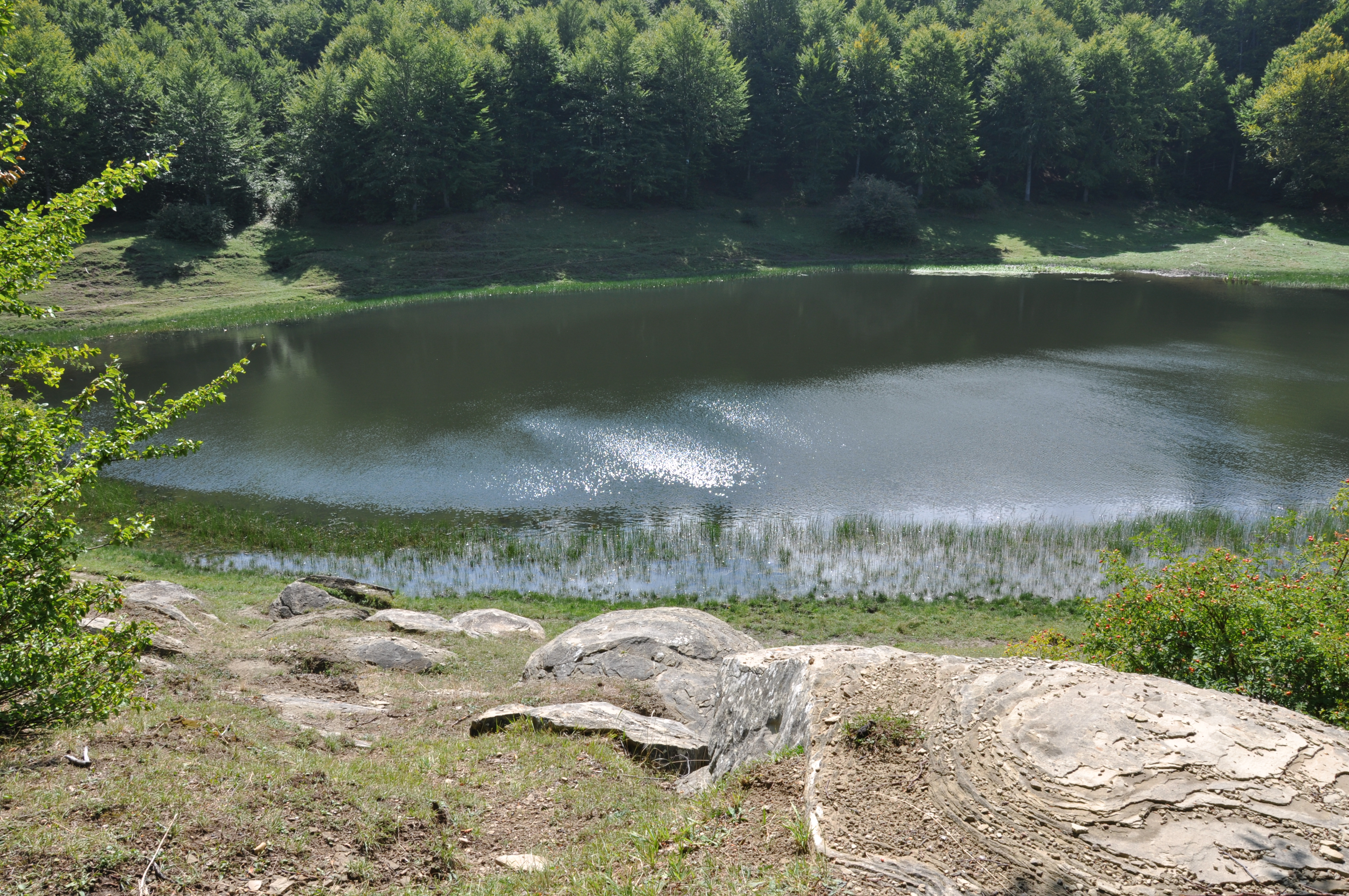
- Lago Secco in the Monti della Laga.

- Coat of arms

- Location within Italy Location within Lazio
- Coordinates: 42°41′40″N 13°14′51″E
- Country: Italy
- Region: Lazio
- Province: Rieti (RI)
- Frazioni: Cassino, Cesaventre, Colleposta, Collespada, Fonte del Campo, Grisciano, Illica, Libertino, Macchia, Macchiola, Mole, Poggio Casoli, Poggio d'Api, Roccasalli, San Giovanni, San Giovanni Vecchio, Terracino, Tino, Villanova

Government
  - Mayor: Stefano Petrucci

Area
  - Total: 87.37 km^{2} (33.73 sq mi)
- Elevation: 855 m (2,805 ft)

Population (31 March 2017)
  - Total: 641
  - Density: 7.34/km^{2} (19.0/sq mi)
- Demonym: Accumolesi
- Time zone: UTC+1 (CET)
  - Summer (DST): UTC+2 (CEST)
- Postal code: 02011
- Dialing code: 0746
- Patron saint: Holy Virgin Addolorata
- Saint day: Third Sunday in September
- Website: Official website

Accumoli is a comune (municipality) in the Province of Rieti in the Italian region of Lazio, located about 110 kilometres (68 mi) northeast of Rome and about 45 kilometres (28 mi) northeast of Rieti. It is located in the natural park known as the "Gran Sasso e Monti della Laga National Park".

Located at an altitude of 855 m above sea level in the Umbria-Marche Apennines, Accumoli is an enclave within the province of Ascoli Piceno. Until 1927, it was part of the province of Aquila in Abruzzo.

The climate is typical internal Apennines with cold, snowy winters and summers almost never too hot.

== History ==
The town has its origins in the 12th century, when the territory in the Valle del Tronto was ruled by the Normans and later the Kingdom of Naples.

On 24 August 2016, numerous buildings were destroyed and damaged by the Central Italy earthquake.

== Main sights ==
- Civic Tower (12th century)
- Palazzo del Podestà, now the town hall
- Palazzo del Guasto (15th century).
- Palazzo Marini, in Mannerist style. is characterized by a portal framed by ashlar diamond and columns with Ionic capitals in twisted elephant legs.
- Palazzo Cappello (17th century), located near the medieval fortress
- Monument to Salvatore (1927)
