= Oblates of Mary =

Oblates of Mary is a name sometimes used for several Roman Catholic religious orders.

- Missionary Oblates of Mary Immaculate
- Oblates of the Virgin Mary
- Benedictines of Mary, Queen of Apostles
