= De Montfort Music =

American record label

- Parent company: Sophia Institute Press (2021–present); AimHigher Entertainment (2012–2021)
- Founded: 2012
- Founder: Monica Fitzgibbons; Kevin Fitzgibbons
- Distributors: Sophia Music Group (2021–present); Sony Masterworks (2017); Universal Music Group (2012–2016)
- Genre: Sacred
- Country of origin: U.S.
- Official website: sophiamusicgroup.com

De Montfort Music is an American record label specializing in sacred music, primarily of the Catholic Church. Formerly an independent label, it has been a subsidiary of Sophia Institute Press since 2021.

== History ==
De Montfort Music was founded in 2012 by Monica and Kevin Fitzgibbons. It specializes in sacred music, especially from the Roman Catholic tradition. Artists recorded by De Montfort include: Benedictines of Mary, Queen of Apostles, Dominican Sisters of Mary, Mother of the Eucharist, the Monks of Norcia, members of the Priestly Fraternity of St. Peter (FSSP), the Monks of Clear Creek Abbey, and the Carmelite Sisters of the Most Sacred Heart of Los Angeles.

Universal Music Group distributed De Montfort's recordings on its Decca label through 2016. In January 2017, De Montfort announced it had signed a new worldwide distribution deal with Sony Masterworks.

On March 24, 2017, De Montfort and its sister label, AimHigher Recordings, announced they had signed a deal with St. John Cantius Church of Chicago to acquire its catalog of self-published recordings and re-release them worldwide.

De Montfort Music was acquired by Sophia Institute Press in 2021, and will release all future albums via its parent's Sophia Music division.

== Discography ==
=== Universal Music ===
- Advent at Ephesus, Benedictines of Mary, Queen of Apostles, November 20, 2012 (B0017837-02)
- Angels and Saints at Ephesus, Benedictines of Mary, Queen of Apostles, May 7, 2013 (B0018437-02)
- Mater Eucharistiae, Dominican Sisters of Mary, Mother of the Eucharist, August 13, 2013 (B0018696-02)
- Lent at Ephesus, Benedictines of Mary, Queen of Apostles, February 12, 2014 (B0019859-02)
- The Rosary: Mysteries, Meditations & Music, Dominican Sisters of Mary, Mother of the Eucharist, November 11, 2014 (B0022160-02)
- Easter at Ephesus, Benedictines of Mary, Queen of Apostles, March 3, 2015 (B0022686-02)
- Benedicta: Marian Chant from Norcia, The Monks of Norcia, June 2, 2015 (B0023153-02)

NB: As of 2022, the rights to all albums recorded by the Benedictines of Mary, Queen of Apostles have reverted to that order.

=== Sony Masterworks ===
- Mozart: Requiem, St. Cecilia Choir and Orchestra of St. John Cantius, March 31, 2017 (88985 42406 2)†
- Puer Natus: Gregorian Chant for Christmas, Schola Cantorum of St. John Cantius, March 31, 2017 (88985 42410 2)†
- Coronation Mass: Regal Music for the King of Bethlehem, Christmas Festival Choir & Orchestra of St. John Cantius, March 31, 2017 (88985 42411 2)†
- Requiem, The Fraternity, May 12, 2017 (88985 41735 2)
- Carols by Candlelight: Lessons & Carols, Choirs of St. John Cantius, August 18, 2017 (88985 45566 2)†
- Christmas Music from St. John Cantius, St. John Cantius Choir of St. Cecilia, August 18, 2017 (88985 45567 2)†
- Renaissance Polyphony of Portugal for Our Lady of Fatima, St. John Cantius Choir of St. Cecilia, August 18, 2017 (88985 45568 2)
- Te Deum: Music of Midnight Mass, Choirs and Orchestra of St. John Cantius, August 18, 2017 (88985 45569 2)†
- O Holy Night: Christmas Carols and Motets, Choirs and Orchestra of St. John Cantius, August 18, 2017 (88985 45572 2)†
- The Traditional Rosary with Music and Devotions in Honor of Our Lady, Choirs of St. John Cantius, August 18, 2017 (88985 45574 2)†
- Jesu, Joy of Man's Desiring: Christmas with the Dominican Sisters of Mary, Dominican Sisters of Mary, Mother of the Eucharist, October 13, 2017 (88985 41741 2)

=== Sophia Music Group ===
- Sancta Nox: Christmas Matins from Bavaria, Seminarians of St. Peter Wigratzbad, September 28, 2021 (00860007106705)
- Rorate Coeli: Marian Sounds of Advent, The Monks of Clear Creek, September 9, 2022 (860008626608)
- Adoration from Carmel: Eucharistic Hymns from the Carmelite Sisters of the Most Sacred Heart of Los Angeles, September 30, 2022 (860008626653)
- Ecce Fiat: The Annunciation, Monastic Choir of Our Lady of Clear Creek Abbey, November 30, 2022‡
- Fauré: Requiem & Other Masterworks, The Boys of St. Paul's Choir School, January 20, 2023
- Benedicta: Marian Chant from Norcia, The Monks of Norcia, March 17, 2023§
- In Sǽcula Sæculórum: Selections of Perennial Chant, Our Lady of Guadalupe Seminary (FSSP), June 23, 2023¶
- Christmas Merry and Bright, Raymond Arroyo (with the NOLA Players), September 22, 2023

† Indicates re-issue of albums previously self-published by St. John Cantius, Chicago.
‡ Indicates re-issue of album previously self-published by the Monastic Choir of Our Lady of Clear Creek Abbey.
§ Indicates re-issue of album previously released by De Montfort and distributed by Universal Music.
¶ Indicates re-issue of album previously self-published by Our Lady of Guadalupe Seminary.
