= Campi, Norcia =

Campi
- Frazione
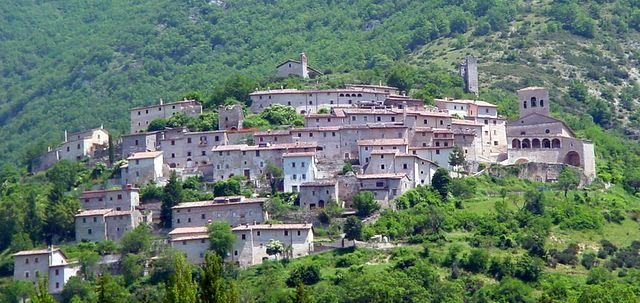
- View of Campi Alto in 2001

- Location within Italy
- Coordinates: 42°51′4.32″N 13°5′41.78″E
- Country: Italy
- Region: Umbria
- Province: Perugia
- Comune: Norcia
- Elevation: 711 m (2,333 ft)

Population (2001)
  - Total: 172
- Demonym: Campiani
- Time zone: UTC+1 (CET)
  - Summer (DST): UTC+2 (CEST)
- Postcode: 06046
- Area code: 0743
- Patron saint: St. Andrew
- Feast day: 30 November

Campi, also known as Campi di Norcia, is a frazione of the comune of Norcia in the province of Perugia, Umbria, Italy. The medieval village has a population of around 200 people. Many of its landmarks, including the Church of San Salvatore, were heavily damaged during the October 2016 Central Italy earthquakes.

== History ==
The area around Campi was first settled in Sabine and Roman times. The Sabine and Roman town was located in the valley where the Church of San Salvatore was eventually built, and by the medieval period this area became known as Campi Vecchio (Old Campi). In the Middle Ages, a fortified settlement was established on the hill overlooking the Roman settlement, and this was known as Campi Nuovo (New Campi). Over time, the castle was abandoned and only the Church of Santa Maria delle Grazie was left standing. In time, the names were reversed, with the medieval Campi Nuovo being renamed Campi Vecchio and vice versa. Modern Campi consists of Campi Nuovo in valley and Campi Alto on the hill.

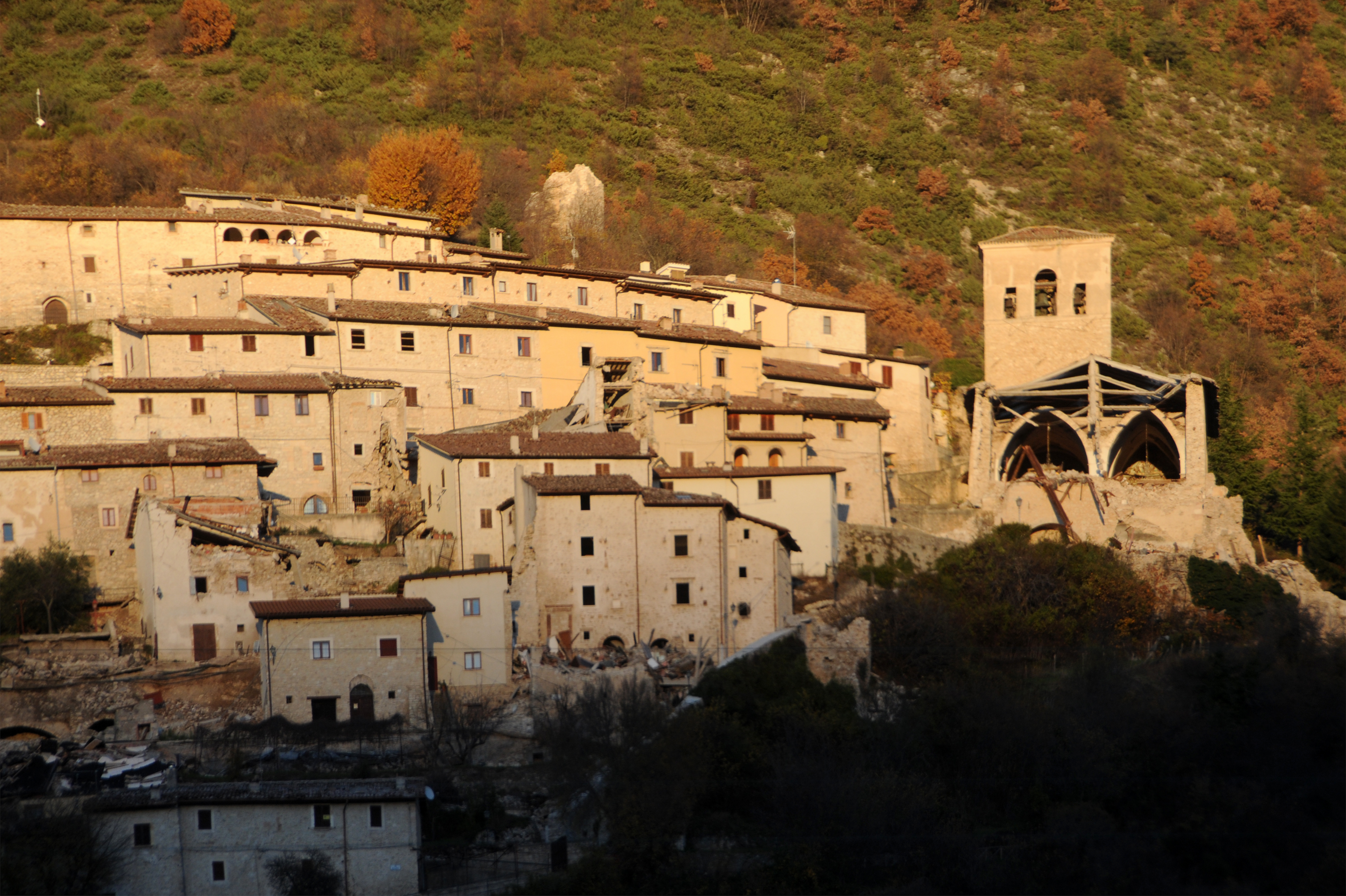
Campi after the 2016 earthquakes

A number of buildings in the village were destroyed during the October 2016 Central Italy earthquakes, including the Churches of San Salvatore and Santa Maria delle Grazie.

== Geography ==
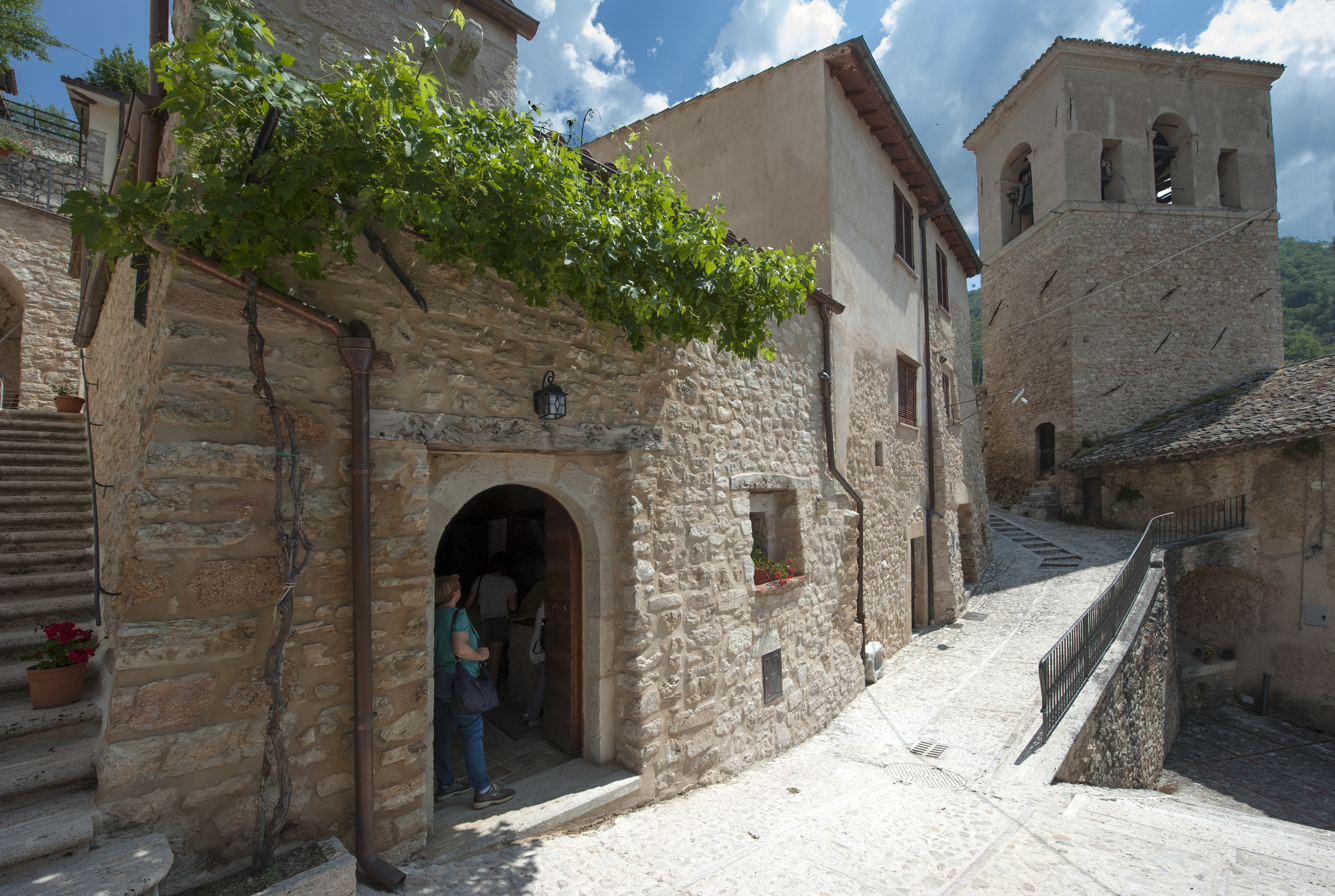
Buildings in Campi

Campi is a small medieval village which is located around 11 km (6.8 mi) north of Norcia. It has an elevation of 711 m (2,333 ft) above sea level, and it is spread over a syncline opposite the Monti Sibillini National Park. It has panoramic views over the Castoriana valley. It had a population of 172 according to the ISTAT census of 2001.

== Economy ==
Agriculture and the cultivation of lentils and barley are important for the local economy. The area is also known for its black truffles (Italian: tartufo nero di Norcia) and industrial activity relating to the preparation of cured meats, particularly the IGP ham.

Campi was visited by tourists due to its proximity to the Monti Sibillini National Park.

== Culture ==
Two important events are the gastronomy and culture festival Il Castello del Gusto, which is held in the first weekend of August, and the feast of Our Lady of the Cross in the first weekend of September.

== Places of interest ==
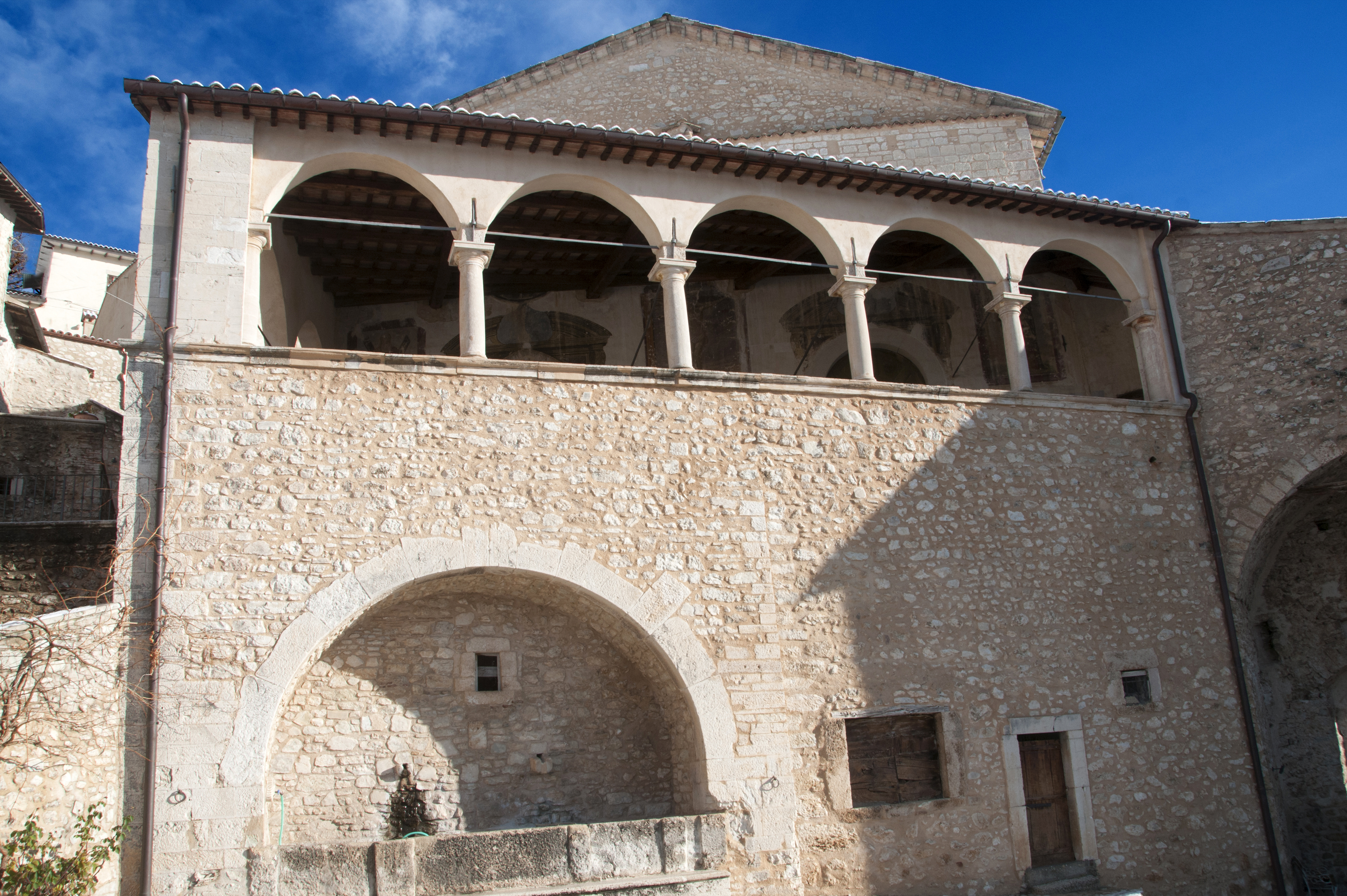
Loggia of the Church of Sant'Andrea, which collapsed in October 2016

- Church of San Salvatore – a church with ancient origins, rebuilt between the 14th and 15th centuries. It was well known for the late 15th-century frescoes in its interior. The church collapsed in the 2016 earthquake.
- Madonna con San Giuseppe di Jacopo Siculo (1507)
- Church of San Lorenzo
- Church of Santa Lucia
- Church of Sant'Andrea – a 16th-century church which had a frescoed façade. Parts of the church including the façade collapsed in the 2016 earthquake.
- Church of Santa Maria di Piazza – a church with a frescoed interior founded in 1351.
- Church of the Madonna del Condotto
- Church of Santa Maria delle Grazie – collapsed in the 2016 earthquake.
