= Mary Wilhelmina Lancaster =

American Benedictine nun (1924–2019)

Mother Mary Wilhelmina of the Most Holy Rosary OSB

Personal life
- Born: Mary Elizabeth Lancaster; April 13, 1924 St. Louis, Missouri, United States
- Died: May 29, 2019 (aged 95) Gower, Missouri, United States

Religious life
- Religion: Catholic

Mary Wilhelmina Lancaster, OSB (born Mary Elizabeth Lancaster; April 13, 1924 – May 29, 2019), in religion Mary Wilhelmina of the Most Holy Rosary, was an African-American Catholic nun who founded the Benedictines of Mary, Queen of Apostles. Her remains were examined and determined to be incorrupt, following an exhumation in May 2023. She was previously a member of the Oblate Sisters of Providence.

== Life ==
Mary Wilhelmina was born Mary Elizabeth Lancaster on April 13, 1924 in St. Louis, Missouri. She was a descendent of enslaved African-Americans from Ste. Genevieve, Missouri. She joined the Oblate Sisters of Providence, a congregation of black religious sisters in Baltimore, Maryland, when she was 17 years old and adopted the name Wilhelmina. After joining the congregation, Lancaster was a schoolteacher in the eastern United States for over 50 years.

In 1995, at the age of 71, disturbed by what she saw as the modernistic loosening of standards and lax observance of the Rule of the Oblate Sisters of Providence, she left and founded the Benedictines of Mary, Queen of Apostles in Scranton, Pennsylvania. In 2005, the sisters' community, which attends the Tridentine Mass and prays using the 1962 edition of the Roman Breviary, moved to Gower, Missouri. They are well known for their Billboard chart-topping albums of Gregorian chant.

Lancaster died in Gower on May 29, 2019, aged 95.

== Exhumation ==
Four years after her death, the Benedictine Sisters exhumed Lancaster's body on the feast of Louis de Montfort (who greatly influenced Mariology), so her remains could be re-interred in their church. The sisters expected to find bones, but after a few days of digging, they lifted up the simple wooden coffin and quickly noticed a massive crack down the middle of the lid. On opening the coffin, prioress of the order, Mother Cecilia, discovered their foundress' remains and religious habit were almost perfectly intact. Jack Klein, owner of Hixson-Klein Funeral Home in Gower and issuer of her death certificate in 2019, confirmed Lancaster was not embalmed and that the wood coffin was not placed into any outer burial container. As such, she was regarded by many as incorrupt, traditionally a sign of sainthood.

Since Lancaster's body was enshrined in glass within the abbey church in 2023, a steady stream of pilgrims has visited her remains by the thousands. In 2024, the Diocese of Kansas City–Saint Joseph published the results of an investigation of her body, finding an atypical lack of decomposition. Nevertheless, the bishop declined at the time to open a cause for sainthood.
