= San Salvatore, Campi =

San Salvatore
- Chiesa di San Salvatore
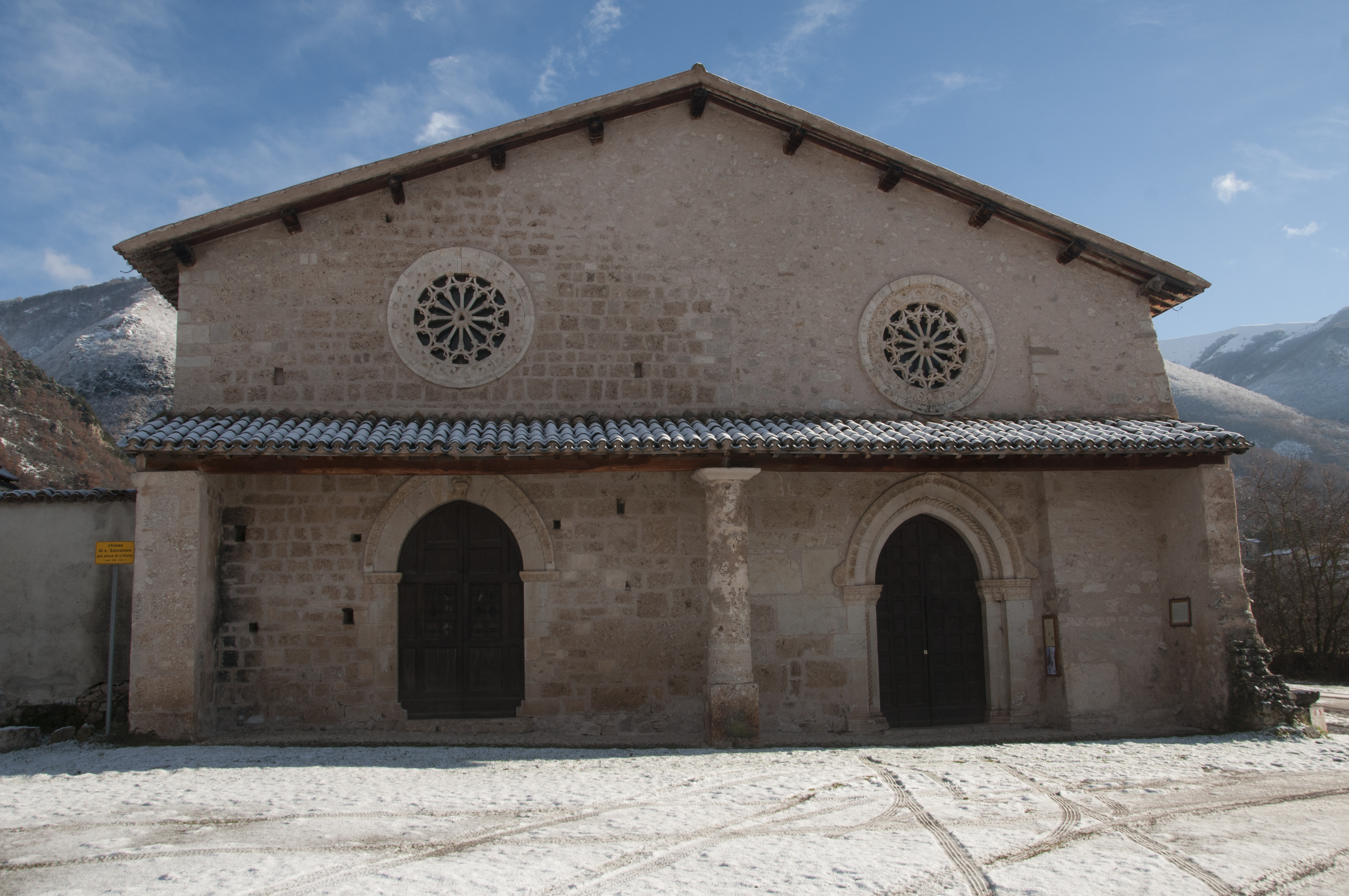
- View of the church in 2014
- San Salvatore
- 42°51′9.66″N 13°5′26.84″E
- Location: Campi, Norcia, Province of Perugia
- Country: Italy
- Denomination: Roman Catholic

History
- Status: Church
- Founded: before 1115
- Founder: Order of Saint Benedict
- Dedication: Saint Mary (until 15th century); Holy Saviour (15th–21st centuries)

Architecture
- Functional status: Inactive
- Style: Romanesque
- Years built: 14th century–1491
- Closed: 24 August 2016
- Demolished: 24–30 October 2016 (collapsed)

Specifications
- Materials: Stone

Administration
- Archdiocese: Spoleto-Norcia

San Salvatore (Italian: Chiesa di San Salvatore), also known as the pieve di Santa Maria, was a Roman Catholic church in Campi, a frazione in the comune of Norcia, Italy. Its existence is first documented in the 11th century, when it was a Benedictine church dedicated to Saint Mary. The church was rebuilt in the 14th century and enlarged in the late 15th century. In 1493, the church was rededicated to the Holy Saviour. The church was an example of Romanesque architecture, and its interior was richly decorated with frescoes. The building collapsed due to damage sustained in the October 2016 Central Italy earthquakes, and only part of the perimeter wall and a pile of rubble survived.

== History ==
The Church of San Salvatore was built in the medieval period in a clearing along the via Nursina, a road which led from Spoleto to Norcia. It replaced an ancient Roman temple, which had been adapted as a church dedicated to Saint Mary upon the advent of Christianity. Some Roman remains were found in the church during restoration works in 1969. The church was first mentioned in 1115, when it was documented as a dependency of the nearby Benedictine Abbey of Sant'Eutizio, known as Plebs S. Marie de Cample cum earum pertinentiis et decimis et aliis pertinentiis or Plebania S. M. de Camplo. The Benedictine monks who administered the church were responsible for the decoration of the building using tithes raised from the faithful.

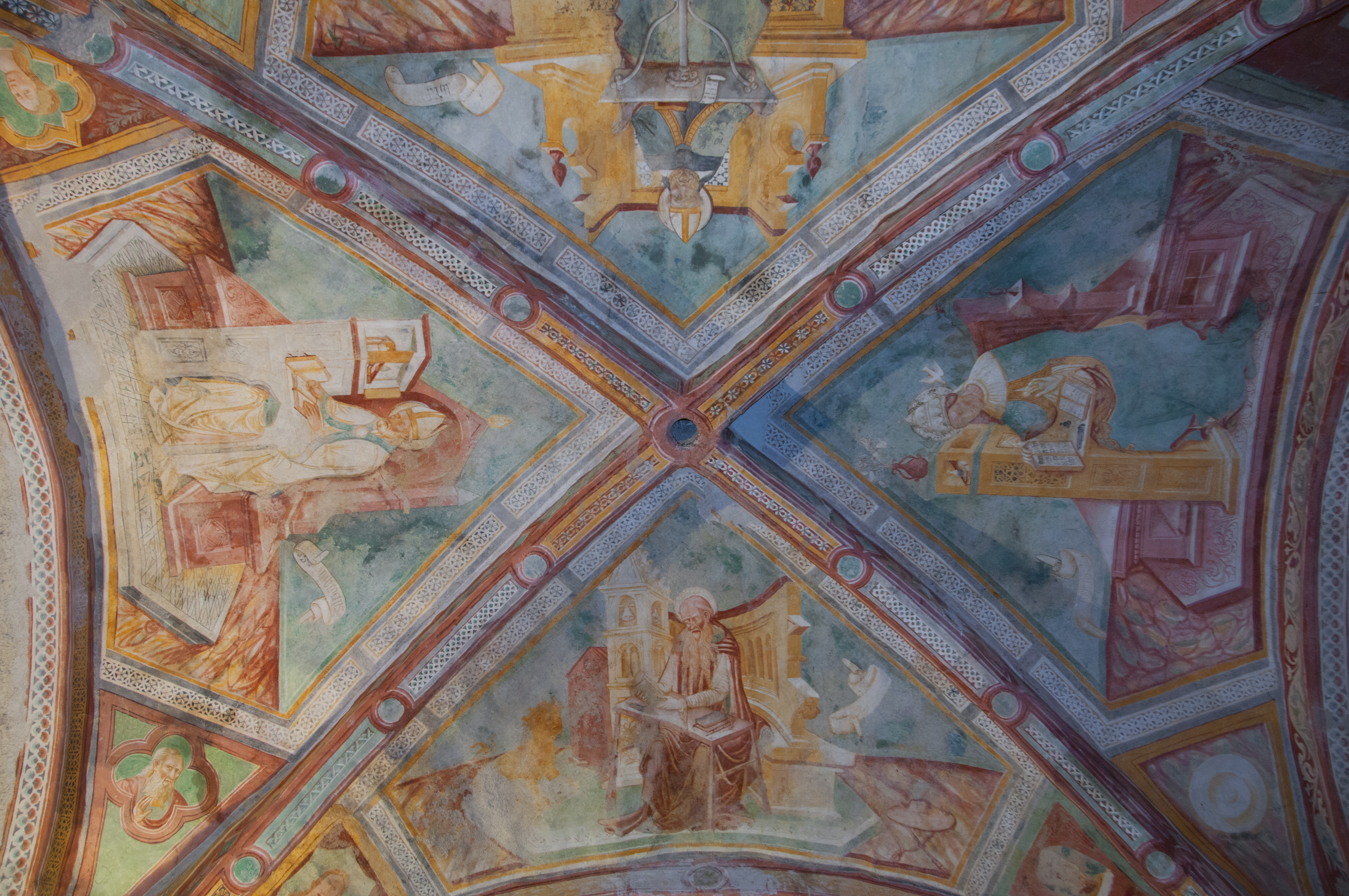
Dottori della Chiesa, 15th-century fresco by Antonio Sparapane

The church was damaged in an earthquake in 1328, and it was reconstructed during the 14th century. The nave was lengthened using a gabled roof, a presbytery was raised, and the façade was enriched with the addition of a portal. The church became too small for the increasing population, so it was further enlarged in the late 15th century, when a new nave was built to the right hand side of the church, doubling its size. The portal on this side bore the year 1491, which was probably the date of completion. At this point, the church acquired its dedication to the Holy Saviour. In 1493, the Benedictines gave up the church to the parish of Sant'Andrea del Castello. The church was damaged by earthquakes and subsequently repaired a number of times.

The Bishop of Spoleto, Carlo Giacinto Lascaris, arrived in Valnerina in October 1712, and documented his visit in a diary. He mentions the church's ancient origins and the disputes between the Benedictines and the community of Campi in his Tomo I° de la Sacra Visita del 1712. Giuseppe Sordini visited the church in October 1908 and made a description of the works of art inside, which was published as Gli Sparapane da Norcia. Nuovi dipinti e nuovi documenti in the Bollettino d'Arte del Ministero della Pubblica Istruzione in 1910.

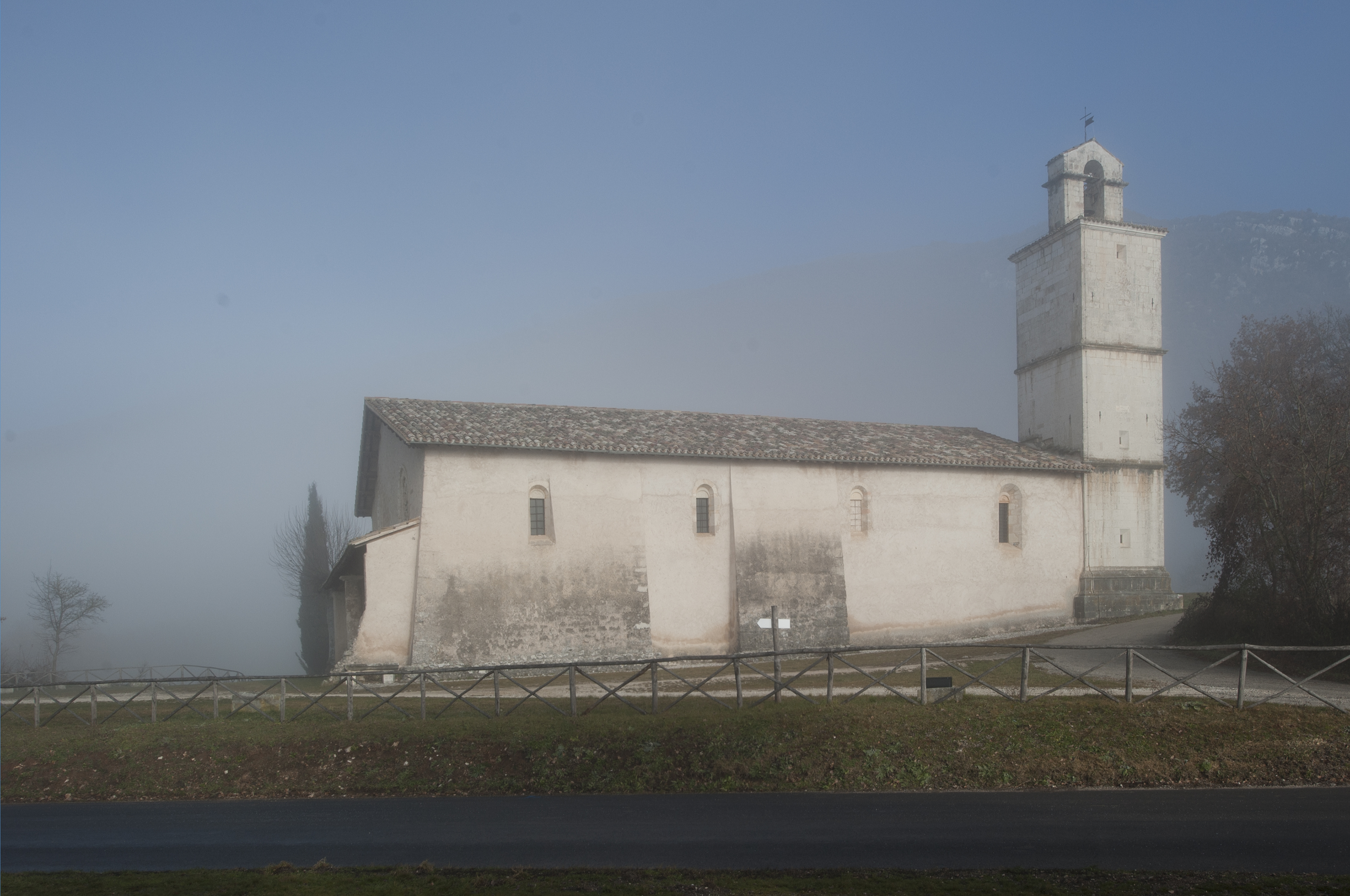

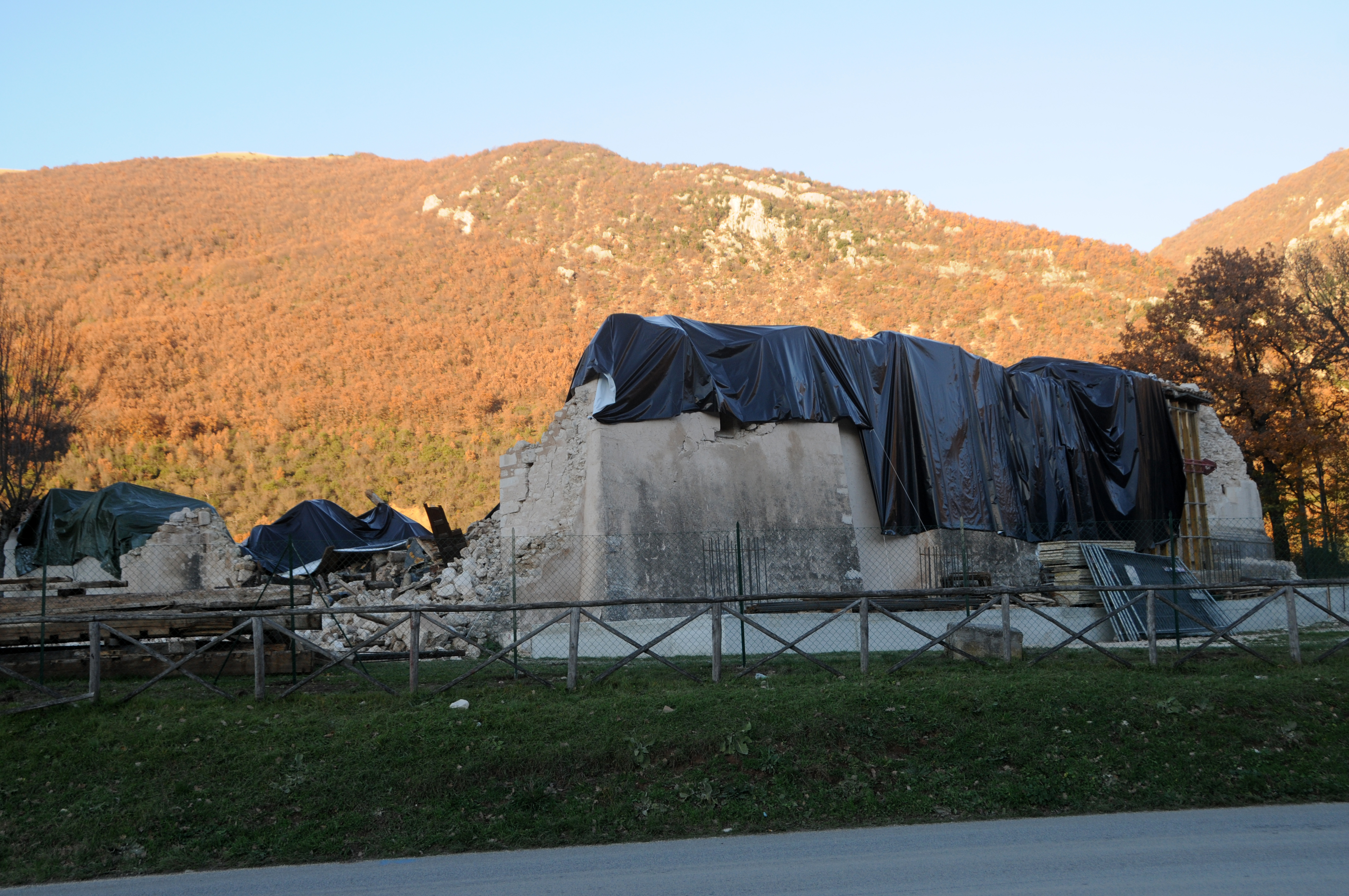
Views of the right side of the church from a similar angle before and after the 2016 earthquake, showing the extent of the damage.

The church was damaged in an earthquake on 24 August 2016, and was closed after being declared structurally unsafe. It was almost completely destroyed in a series of subsequent earthquakes in October 2016, with most of the church collapsing on 26 October and the remaining parts collapsing four days later on 30 October. Only part of the perimeter wall remained, with the rest of the site becoming a pile of rubble. A wooden crucifix and fresco fragments have been recovered from the ruins, and efforts are being made to preserve as many artifacts as possible.

== Description ==
=== Exterior ===
The Church of San Salvatore was a Romanesque rectangular stone building with two naves sharing a single symmetrical façade. It had two decorated portals, with the left one bearing a carved symbol of a lamb, and the one on the right being more ornate and bearing the year 1491. The façade also included a narrow porch held by a central column. Two rose windows were located on the upper part of the façade, one above each portal. The right wall of the church contained four windows.

A bell tower was located at the rear of the church. The lower courses of this were built out of well-polished hewn stones, and the tower was begun by local masters in the 15th century and completed by Lombard masters in around 1538. The bell tower was destroyed in an earthquake in 1859, and it was later rebuilt. The lower part of the tower survived the 2016 earthquake.

A small cemetery located next to the church was also severely damaged by the 2016 earthquakes.

=== Interior ===
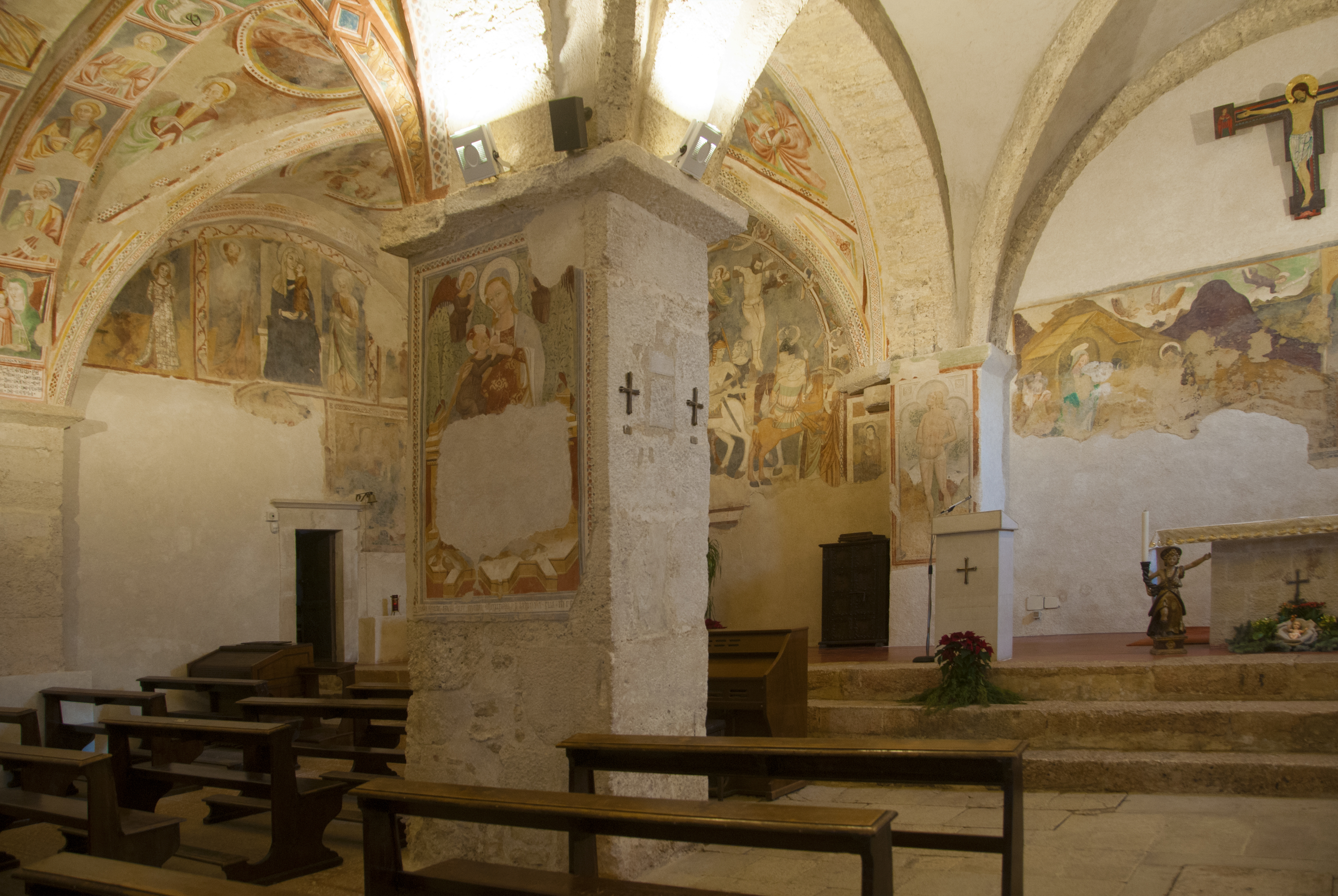
The church's frescoed interior

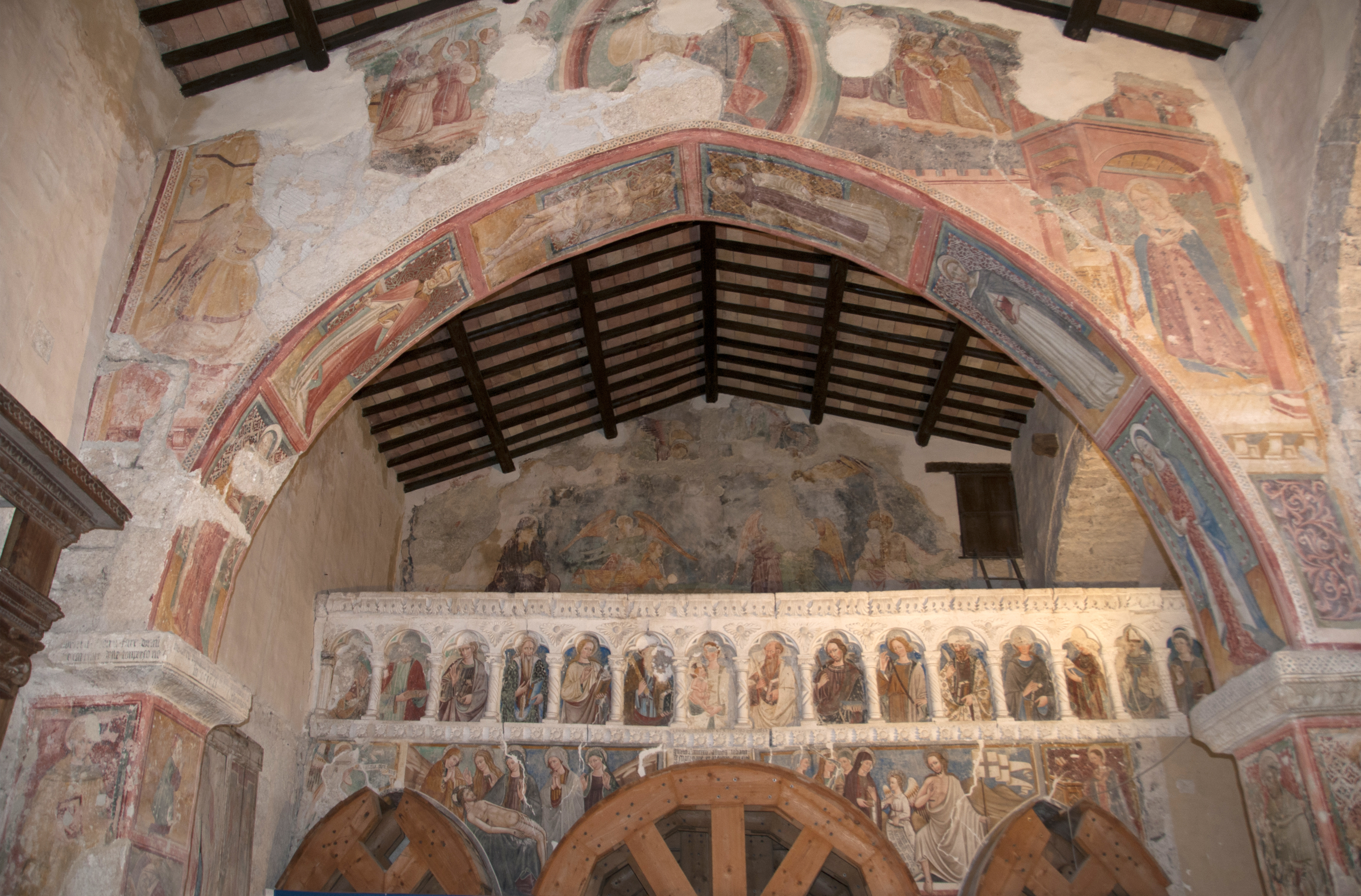
Triumphal arch and the iconostasis

The floor of the right half of the church consisted of a schiazze paving dating back to 1528. This consisted of rectangular local stones of various sizes and colour shades. The roof was tiled on the left side and had cross vaults and ribs on the right. An immersion baptismal font, which might have been a Roman altar, was moved to the parish house in the early 1970s to protect it from theft. The left aisle of the church was richly decorated with frescoes and a loggia with an iconostasis. The frescoes were the works of a number of artists, including Giovanni and Antonio Sparapane, Nicola d'Ulisse and Domenico di Jacopo. The right aisle was not richly decorated, but its floor was engraved with an unrealized project for a bell tower.

== See also ==
- Catholic Church in Italy
