= Deal W. Hudson =

American publisher and political activist

Deal Wyatt Hudson (born November 20, 1949) is an American conservative political activist.

Hudson is the former publisher and editor of Crisis Magazine and InsideCatholic.com. He is currently president of the Morley Institute for Church and Culture. Hudson also hosts the radio show Church and Culture on Ave Maria Radio and serves as publisher and editor of The Christian Review.

Hudson is the former Chairman and founder of Catholic Advocate. In September, 2020, Hudson was named a Senior Fellow of the Albertus Magnus Institute in Sacramento, California.

== Biography ==
Hudson was born in Denver, Colorado. He attended the University of Texas-Austin and converted to Catholicism in 1984. He discusses this conversion in his memoir, An American Conversion.

In 1980, Hudson became an Associate Professor in philosophy at Mercer University. Raised as a Protestant, Hudson became a Southern Baptist while attending college, converted to Catholicism in 1984.

In 1989, Hudson became a professor of philosophy at Fordham University, specializing in St. Thomas Aquinas and modern Thomism. He resigned from his tenured position at Fordham in 1995, following his alleged sexual harassment of a freshman student.

He served as president of the American Maritain Association from 1984 to 1994 and was chairman of the American Academy for Liberal Education from 1996 to 2005.

== Political activism ==
Hudson played a role in American politics as an adviser on Catholic outreach for George W. Bush’s presidential campaigns in 2000 and 2004. He coordinated Catholic voter strategy and later led a Catholic working group to advise the White House on issues important to Catholic Americans. President Bush appointed him to the President’s Council on Service and Civic Participation.

In 2003, Hudson was part of the official U.S. delegation to Rome for the 25th anniversary celebration of Pope John Paul II’s papacy.

Hudson is credited with fashioning an outreach to Catholic voters in the 2016 presidential campaign of Donald Trump.

== Publishing and media ==
In 1995, Hudson became publisher of Crisis, a conservative Roman Catholic magazine based in Washington, D.C. He later served as both publisher and editor of Crisis and its online successor, InsideCatholic.com.

In 2014, he launched the “Church and Culture” radio series on the Ave Maria Radio Network, and in 2015, he founded The Christian Review, a publication focused on faith and culture.

Hudson has written, edited or contributed to several books. In 2004, he wrote the online guide "How to Vote Catholic". Hudson has written for the Los Angeles Times, Slate. The Wall Street Journal and the Spectator. Among Hudson's activities outside politics is his sponsorship of an annual poetry luncheon at the beginning of Advent each Christmas season.

== Publications ==
- Understanding Maritain (ed. with Matthew J. Mancini). Mercer University Press, 1987 ISBN 978-0-86554-279-2
- The Future of Thomism: The Maritain Sequence (ed. with Dennis William Moran). University of Notre Dame Press, 1992 ISBN 0-268-00986-4
- Sigrid Undset: On Saints and Sinners (ed.) Ignatius Press, 1994 ISBN 0-89870-483-9
- Happiness and the Limits of Satisfaction. Rowman & Littlefield, 1995 ISBN 0-8476-8139-4; PB ISBN 978-0-8476-8140-2
- Public Catholicism: The Challenge of Living the Faith in a Secular American Culture (contributor). Our Sunday Visitor, 1996 ISBN 0-87973-754-9
- An American Conversion: One Man's Discovery of Beauty and Truth in Times of Crisis. Crossroad, 2003 ISBN 0-8245-2126-9
- Onward, Christian Soldiers: The Growing Political Power of Catholics and Evangelicals in the United States. Simon & Schuster, 2008 ISBN 1-4165-2442-8; PB, 2010 ISBN 1-4165-2446-0
- "Issues for Catholic Voters, 2012 Edition". Coauthored with Matt Smith. Amazon Digital Services, 2012 ASIN: B0076RXG42
- Hudson, Deal W. (September 9, 2019). How to Keep from Losing Your Mind: Educating Yourself Classically to Resist Cultural Indoctrination. TAN Books. ISBN 978-1505113525.
- Hudson, Deal W. (October 8, 2020). 365 Days of Catholic Wisdom: A Treasury of Truth, Beauty, and Goodness. Tan Books. ISBN 978-1-5051-1714-1.
- Schlapp, Matt; Hudson, Deal W. (February 22, 2022). The Desecrators: Defeating the Cancel Culture Mob and Reclaiming One Nation Under God. TAN Books. ISBN 978-1-5051-2009-7.

== See also ==
- Religion and politics in the 2008 U.S. presidential campaign
