= AimHigher Recordings =

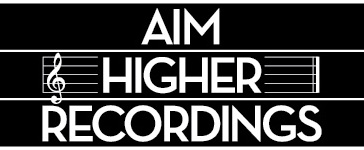
- Parent company: Sophia Institute Press (2021–present); AimHigher Entertainment (2012–2021)
- Founded: 2012
- Founder: Monica Fitzgibbons; Kevin Fitzgibbons
- Distributor(s): Sophia Music Group (2021–present); Independent (2019); Sony Masterworks (2017); Universal Music Group (2012–2016)
- Genre: Sacred
- Country of origin: U.S.

AimHigher Recordings is an American record label. Formerly an independent label, since 2021 it has been a subsidiary of Sophia Institute Press.

== History ==
AimHigher Recordings was founded in 2012 by Monica and Kevin Fitzgibbons as a counterpart to its sister label, De Montfort Music. Whereas De Montfort has released primarily recordings of Roman Catholic choral music, AimHigher's catalog covers a more eclectic repertoire, featuring music for choir, big band, and organ. Artists recorded by AimHigher include the Boys of St. Paul's Choir School, the NOLA Players, and the London Oratory School Schola Cantorum.

Universal Music Group distributed AimHigher's recordings on its Decca and Verve labels through 2016. In January 2017, AimHigher announced it had signed a new worldwide distribution deal with Sony Masterworks.

On March 24, 2017, AimHigher and De Montfort announced they had signed a deal with St. John Cantius Church of Chicago to acquire its catalog of self-published recordings and re-release them worldwide.

AimHigher Recordings was acquired by Sophia Institute Press in 2021, along with De Montfort Music, and will release all future albums via its parent's Sophia Music division.

== Discography ==
=== Universal Music ===
- Christmas in Harvard Square, The Boys of St. Paul's Choir School, October 7, 2014 (B0020969-02)
- Christmastime in New Orleans (Soundtrack Album from the PBS Television Special), The NOLA Players, September 9, 2016 (B0025504-02)

=== Sony Masterworks ===
- Sacred Treasures of England, London Oratory Schola Cantorum Boys Choir, February 10, 2017 (88985 41636 2)
- Jonathan Rudy: Epic Music for Organ, Jonathan Rudy, March 31, 2017 (88985 42408 2)†
- Miserere: Music for Holy Week, St. Cecilia Choir of St. John Cantius, March 31, 2017 (88985 42409 2)†
- The Nutcracker: Christmas Music for Organ, Andrew Schaeffer, August 18, 2017 (88985 45570 2)†
- Ave Maria, The Boys of St. Paul's Choir School, September 8, 2017 (88985 41739 2)

=== Independent ===
- Sacred Treasures of Spain, London Oratory Schola Cantorum Boys Choir, June 28, 2019 (DM014 77880 9)‡

† Indicates re-issue of albums previously self-published by St. John Cantius, Chicago.
‡ Withdrawn from distribution shortly after release and subsequently re-released in 2020 by Hyperion Records.
