= Sophia Institute Press =

American non-profit publishing company

- Status: Active
- Founded: 1983
- Founder: John Barger
- Successor: Charlie McKinney, President
- Country of origin: United States
- Headquarters location: Nashua, New Hampshire
- Publication types: Books, magazines
- Nonfiction topics: Catholicism, Christianity, religion
- Revenue: US$10 million (2020)
- No. of employees: 48
- Official website: www.sophiainstitute.com

Sophia Institute Press is a non-profit Catholic publishing company based in Nashua, New Hampshire, United States.

It publishes Catholic books, the online opinion journal Crisis Magazine, the traditionalist Catholic website OnePeterFive, the Tridentine Mass missalette Benedictus, the website CatholicExchange.com, and catechetical materials for teachers. It also operates a music division, Sophia Music Group, via its 2021 acquisition of the De Montfort Music and AimHigher Recordings labels.

== History ==
Sophia Institute was founded in 1983 by John L. Barger, then a philosophy professor at Magdalen College in Bedford, New Hampshire, along with his student Paul DiIulio. Under Barger's direction, the press published over 200 titles and 2.5 million books. In 2011, while the press was the publishing division of Thomas More College of Liberal Arts and Holy Spirit College, Charlie McKinney was the publisher's chief operating officer.

In 2012, Barger retired from directing Sophia Institute, and the institute's board selected Charlie McKinney as its new president.

== Sophia Institute for Teachers ==
In 2014, Sophia Institute began Sophia Institute for Teachers to aid Catholic religion teachers, offering lesson plans, instructional videos, and teacher formation workshops.

== Partnership with EWTN Global Catholic Network ==
In 2015, Sophia Institute Press formed a joint venture with the international Catholic television service EWTN to establish EWTN Publishing, a new entity that publishes books by the network's foundress Mother Angelica and other hosts of EWTN programming.

== Crisis magazine ==
In 1982 at Notre Dame, theologian Michael Novak and philosophy professor Ralph McInerny founded an opinion magazine under the title Catholicism in Crisis, as a voice of Catholic neoconservative political and cultural thought. In 1986 its title was changed to Crisis. From 1995 to 2011 Deal Hudson was the magazine's publisher. In late 2007 the magazine ceased print publication, and its content moved to its companion website under the title "Inside Catholic". After Sophia Institute Press acquired the magazine in 2011, it resumed the name Crisis. The college transferred the magazine to Sophia Institute in 2012. Eric Sammons was named the Editor-in-Chief in January 2021.

=== Crisis Publications ===
In April 2019, the press began publishing books with Crisis Magazine branding. The new imprint, called Crisis Publications, is dedicated to books that examine social and cultural trends from a Roman Catholic perspective.

In September 2020, the press began Tradivox series, a multi-volume book series that restores and reprints historical Catholic catechisms.
