= October 2016 Central Italy earthquakes =

Series of earthquakes

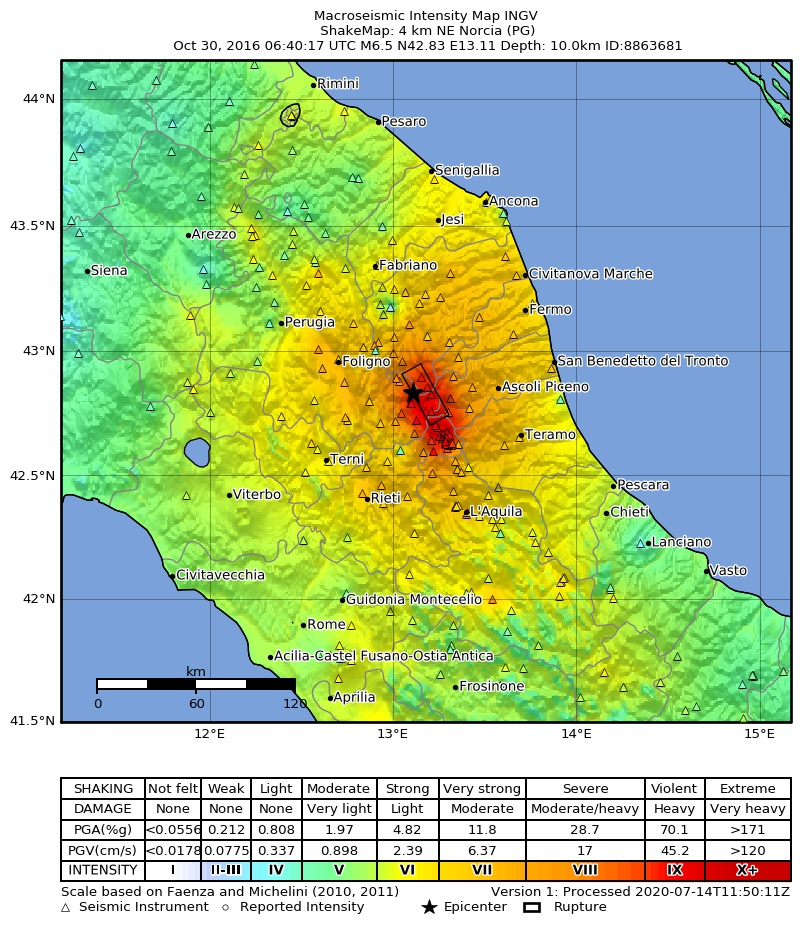
- Shakemap for the 30 October quake

- Location within Italy
- UTC time: A: 2016-10-26 17:10:37; B: 2016-10-26 19:18:08; C: 2016-10-30 06:40:18
- ISC event: A: 611830883; B: 612638074; C: 609624987
- USGS-ANSS: A: ComCat; B: ComCat; C: ComCat
- Local date: A: 26 October 2016; B: 26 October 2016; C: 30 October 2016
- Local time: A: 19:10; B: 21:18; C: 08:40
- Magnitude: A: 5.5 M_{w}; B: 6.1 M_{w}; C: 6.6 M_{w}
- Depth: 10.0 km (6.2 mi)
- Epicenter: 42.855°N 13.088°E
- Areas affected: Central Italy
- Max. intensity: MMI XI (Extreme)
- Casualties: 3 deaths Dozens injured ≈ 100,000 homeless

A series of major earthquakes struck Central Italy between the Marche and Umbria regions in October 2016. The third quake on 30 October was the largest in Italy in 36 years, since the 1980 Irpinia earthquake.

== Earthquakes ==
A magnitude 5.5 earthquake struck 8 km (5 mi) east southeast of Sellano on 26 October at 19:11 local time (17:11 UTC) at a depth of 10 km (6 mi). The earthquake was also felt in the city of Rome. In the region of Marche some houses collapsed, Italian media reported. There were also power failures and the telephone lines were interrupted.

A magnitude 6.1 intraplate earthquake struck 3 km (2 mi) west of Visso on 26 October at 21:18 local time (19:18 UTC). The earthquake, which occurred two months after a magnitude 6.2 earthquake in August, struck about 30 km (20 mi) to the northwest of the August earthquake's epicenter. The civil protection, however, estimated the consequences less dramatically than feared. According to official data, a man died because he had suffered a heart attack as a result of the quake.

The Colli Alti e Bassi Fault as seen in October 2026, on which 60 cm of near-vertical displacement accumulated in the 2016 October 30 earthquake.

A third large, shallow earthquake of USGS preliminary magnitude 6.6 struck 6 km (4 mi) north of Norcia at 07:40 local time (06:40 UTC) on 30 October. Early news and social media reports showed heavy damage to some structures. The village of Arquata del Tronto was destroyed, as were several heritage buildings. These include the Basilica of Saint Benedict in Norcia, the Church of San Salvatore and other churches in Campi. Two women died of sudden heart attacks during the quake.

== Shocks ==
Date / time (UTC)	Magnitude	Type	Depth Hypocenter	Epicenter		
Date / time (UTC)	Magnitude	Type	Depth Hypocenter	Location	Latitude	Longitude
2016-10-26 17:10:36	5.5	M_{w}	8.7 km	Macerata	42.8802	13.1275
2016-10-26 19:18:05	6.1	M_{w}	7.5 km	Macerata	42.9087	13.1288
2016-10-26 21:42:01	4.5	M_{w}	9.5 km	Macerata	42.8612	13.1283
2016-10-30 06:40:17	6.6	M_{w}	9.4 km	Perugia	42.84	13.11
2016-10-30 06:44:30	4.6	M_{L}	10.0 km	Perugia	42.8507	13.0715
2016-10-30 07:13:05	4.5	M_{L}	10.8 km	Rieti	42.6982	13.2347
2016-10-30 12:07:00	4.6	M_{L}	9.7 km	Perugia	42.8445	13.0775
2016-10-30 13:34:54	4.5	M_{L}	9.2 km	Perugia	42.8033	13.1653
2016-11-01 07:56:39	4.8	M_{L}	10.0 km	Macerata	43.00	13.16
2016-11-03 00:35:01	4.8	M_{L}	8.0 km	Macerata	43.03	13.05

(Source: Istituto Nazionale di Geofisica e Vulcanologia)

Magnitude of October 2016 Central Italy earthquakes.

== Geological aspects ==
The quakes occurred in a seismic gap which is located between the areas hit by the 2016 August earthquake and the one in Umbria and Marche of 1997. In that gap no strong earthquake happened for more than 100 years until 2016.

As the process of faulting along the chain of the Apennine Mountains is a relatively recent one in geological terms, starting 500,000 years ago, the faults are more irregular, so more shaking occurs due to foreshocks according to seismologist Ross Stein from Stanford University. In this case the destructive shock on 26 October was preceded by the foreshock by two hours, causing people to leave their homes and be safer when the larger shock occurred.

== Comparisons with August 2016 earthquake ==
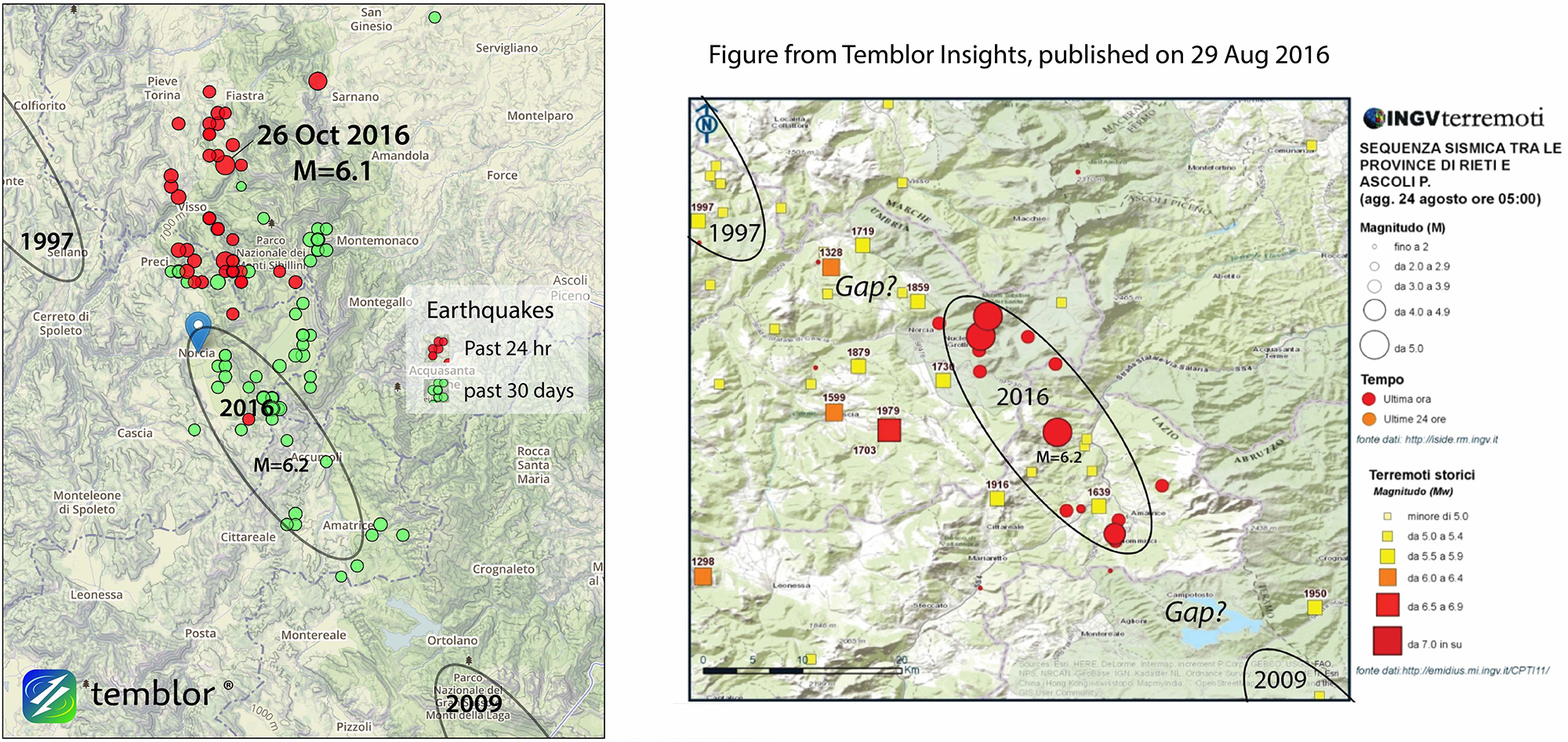

The map to the left is dated 27 October, before the biggest shock of 30 October.

Earthquakes from August 2016 Central Italy earthquake.

== See also ==
- August 2016 Central Italy earthquake
- January 2017 Central Italy earthquakes
- List of earthquakes in Italy
- List of earthquakes in 2016
