= Norcia Abbey =

Benedictine monastery in Norcia, Italy

Abbey of St. Benedict on the Mountain
- Abbazia di San Bendetto in Monte
- Interactive map of Abbey of St. Benedict on the Mountain

Monastery information
- Other name: Norcia Abbey
- Order: Benedictine
- Established: 10th century
- Disestablished: 1810
- Reestablished: June 15, 1999
- Mother house: Benedictine Confederation
- Dedication: St. Benedict of Nursia
- Diocese: Spoleto-Norcia

People
- Abbot: The Rt. Rev. Dom Benedict Nivakoff, O.S.B

Site
- Location: Via Case Sparse, 164; 06046 Norcia, Perugia
- Country: Italy
- Coordinates: 42°47′54.492″N 13°7′24.024″E
- Website: https://nursia.org

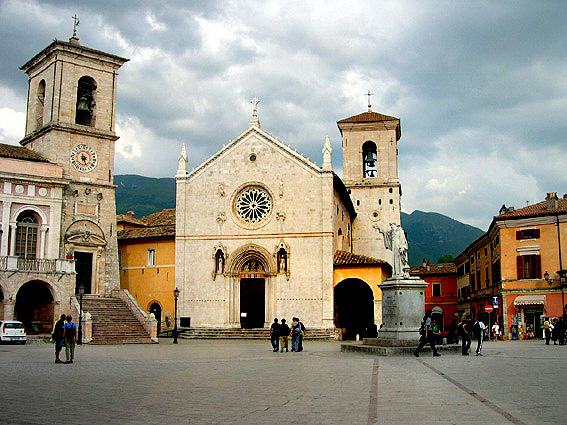
The Basilica of St. Benedict was partially destroyed by earthquakes in 2016.

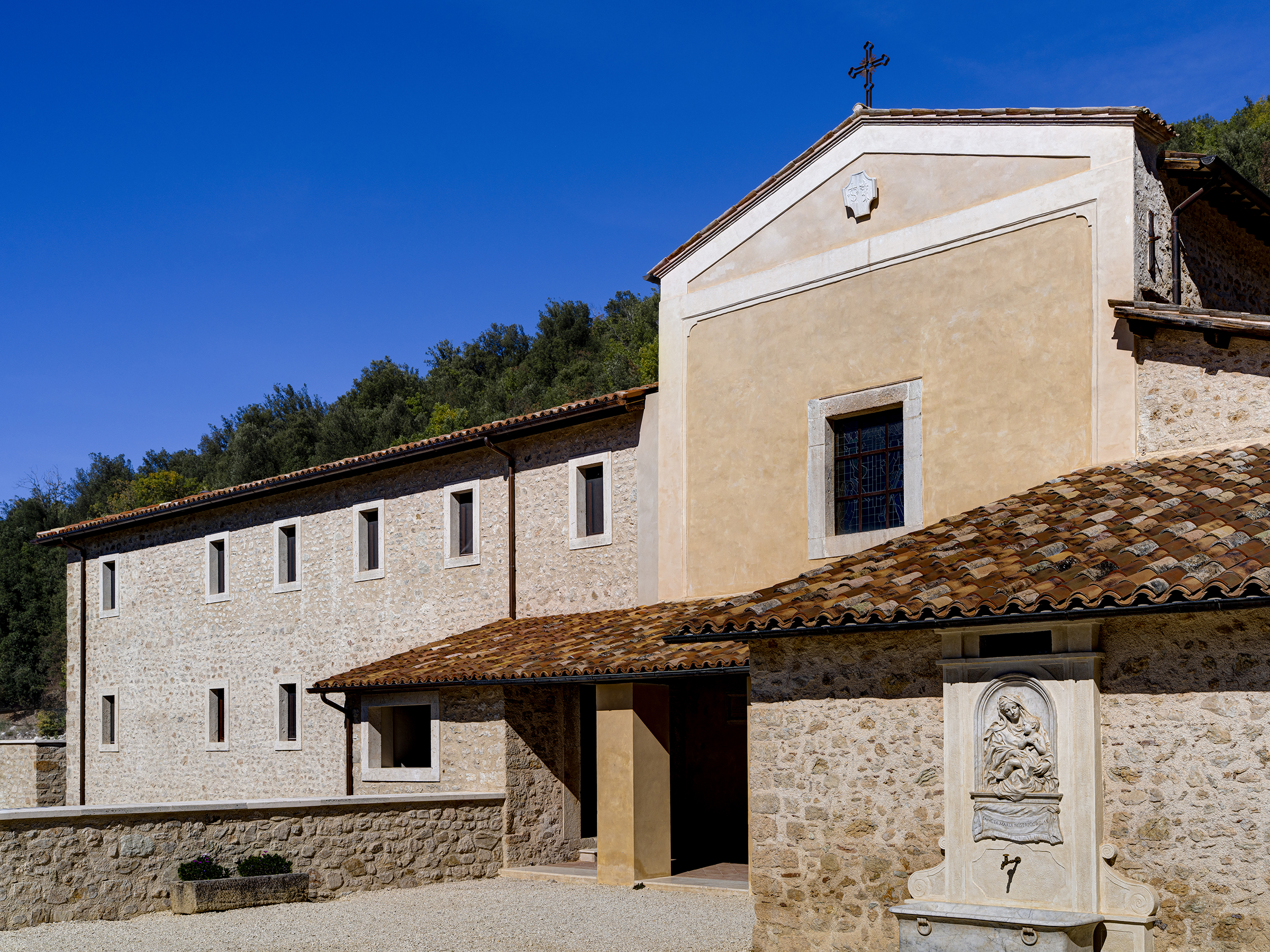
Abbey of St. Benedict on the Mountain, a.k.a. Norcia Abbey

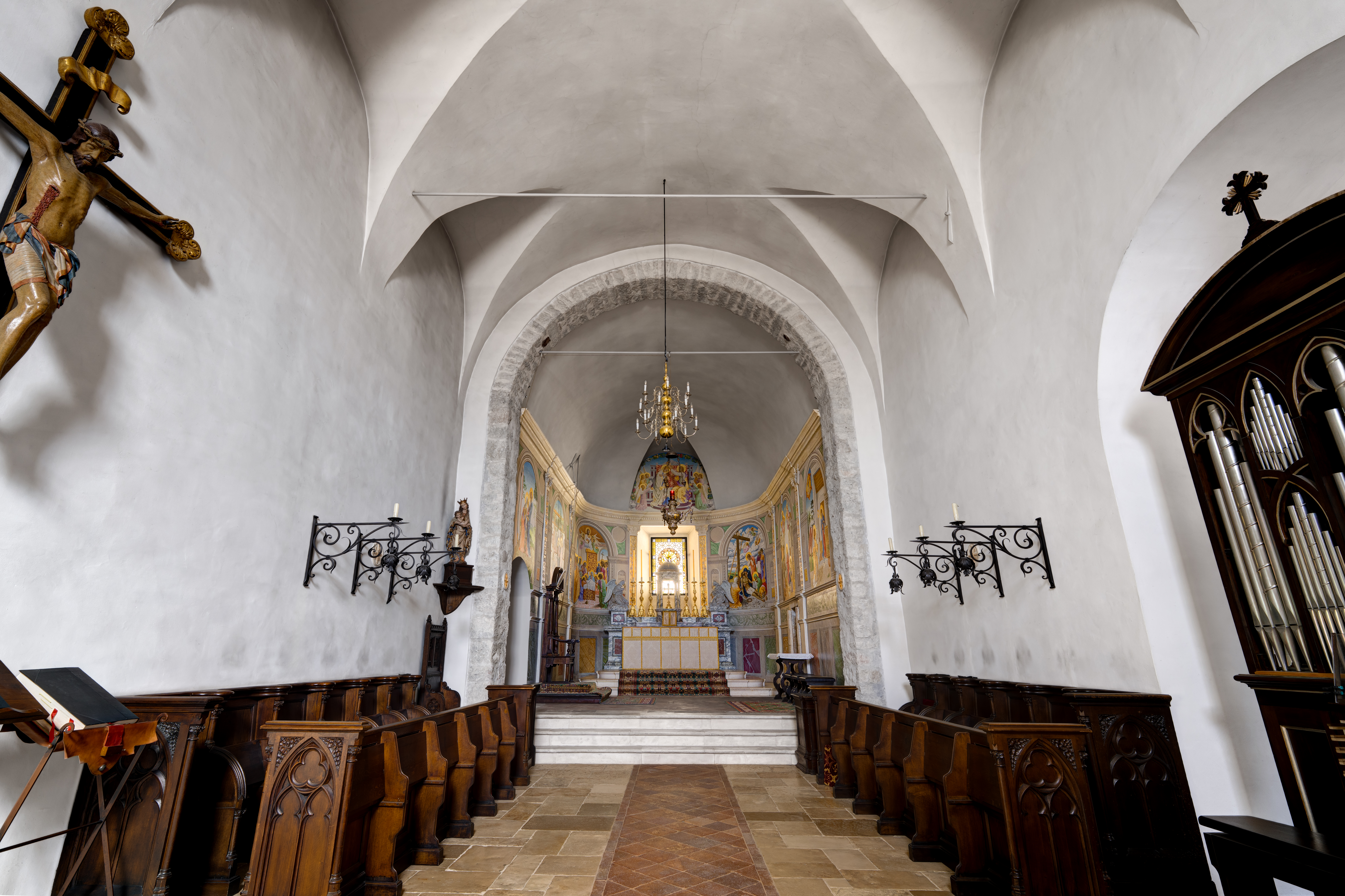
Church of Santae Mariae Misericordiae. Abbey of St. Benedict on the Mountain, a.k.a. Norcia Abbey

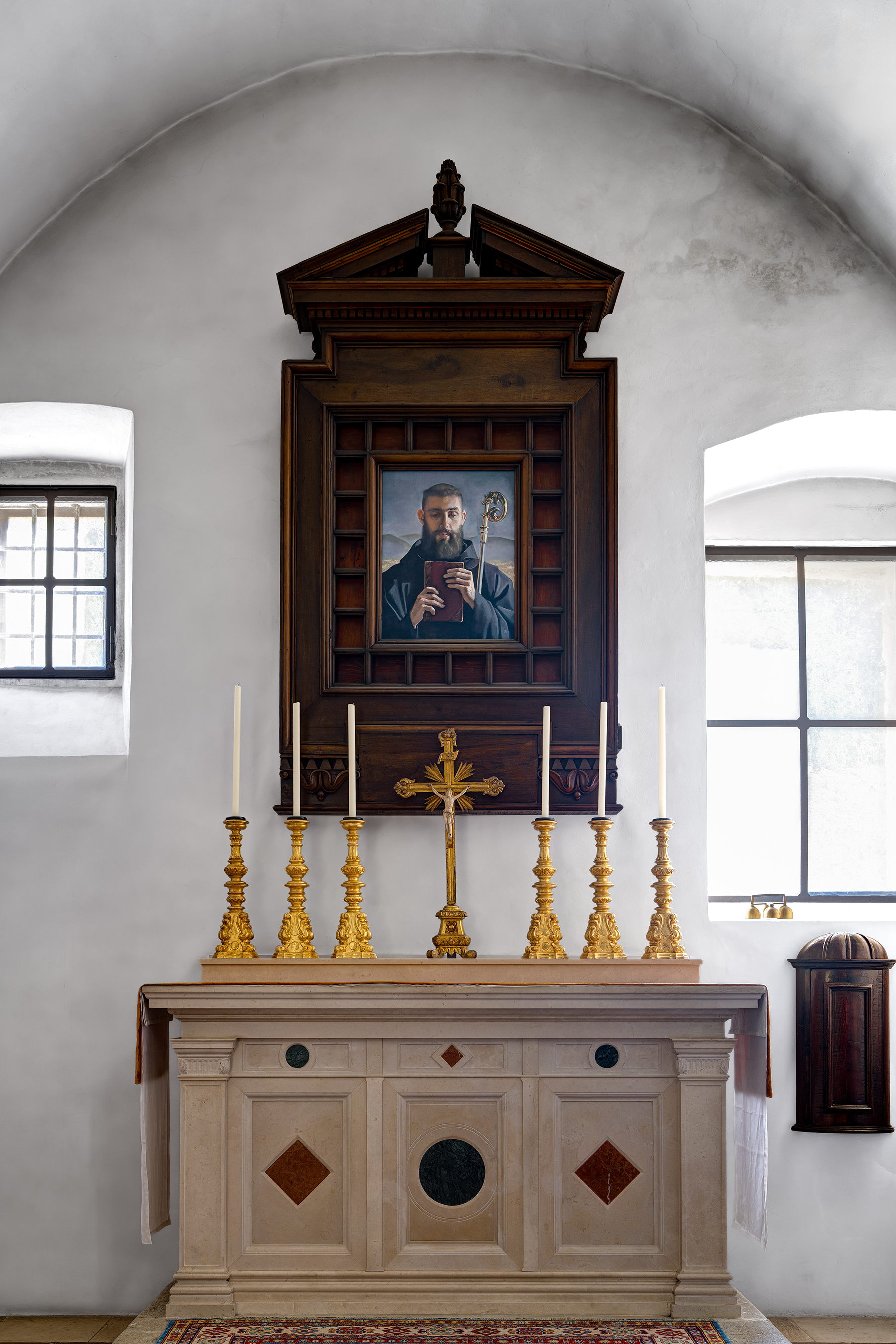
Chapel in Abbey of St. Benedict on the Mountain, a.k.a. Norcia Abbey

The Abbey of St. Benedict on the Mountain (Italian: Abbazia di San Benedetto in Monte), also known as Norcia Abbey, is a Benedictine community of monks located in southeastern Umbria, just outside the city of Norcia, Italy. Originally founded in the 10th century, the abbey was closed by the Napoleonic Army as part of its suppression of religious communities. A new monastic community was founded in 1998 by a group of American monks which was formally established the following year as a priory directly under the supervision of the Abbot Primate.

The monks exclusively use the Extraordinary Form of the Roman Rite as well as the traditional form of the Divine Office. They have become well known for their production of beer, the sale of which provides income for the monastery, as well as for their best-selling album of Gregorian chant.

Until 2016, the monks were the custodians of the Basilica of St. Benedict in the center of Norcia, built above the birthplace of St. Benedict of Nursia and his twin sister, St. Scholastica. The basilica and monastery were partially destroyed in October 2016 in an earthquake which damaged much of Norcia and the surrounding area. As a result, the monks relocated to an abandoned Capuchin monastery and church located on a hillside 1.6 miles (2.6 km) east of the center of Norcia, where they have constructed temporary accommodations and constructed a larger, permanent monastery.

Restoration of the monastery was completed in time for the community's celebration on June 15, 2024, of the 25th anniversary of their founding.

== History ==
In the 8th century a chapel was built in Norcia so pilgrims could pray at the site of St. Benedict's birth. Monks came to Norcia in the 10th century, and remained in one form or another until 1810, when the Napoleonic Code forced the closure of the monastery. The current Benedictine community was founded in September 1998 by Cassian Folsom, an American monk of St. Meinrad Archabbey in Indiana, who served as its first prior. He and two other monks began the community in Rome, before moving to Norcia in December 2000 at the invitation of the Archbishop of Spoleto-Norcia. They were charged to care for the Basilica of San Benedetto and for the many visiting pilgrims, and the community grew steadily over the years. The monastery was canonically established in 1999 and became an independent priory sui iuris in 2018 in the Benedictine confederation under the jurisdiction of the Abbot Primate.

In October 2016 a 6.6 magnitude earthquake destroyed the 14th-century basilica as well as most of the monastery. Although none of the monks were injured, they, like thousands of others throughout Umbria, were left homeless. As a result, the monks moved outside the city to an abandoned monastery that was once part of a Capuchin friary, and later was used as the seminary of the Diocese of Norcia. It was abandoned in the mid-20th century after the Diocese of Norcia was merged with that of nearby Spoleto. The monks had originally purchased the badly dilapidated church with the hopes of turning it into a monastic grange, i.e., a satellite property of the monastery.

In November 2016, Folsom announced that he was stepping down as prior, saying that he lacked the energy necessary to head the community in the process of rebuilding. Benedict Nivakoff, an American who had previously served as subprior and novice master, was appointed the new prior. Since 2016 the monks have constructed several temporary structures on their new site, including a chapel, cells, refectory and library, and are currently building a larger permanent structure. As of January 2023, there are 20 monks in the community.

On May 25, 2024, the Abbot Primate of the Benedictine Order raised the status of the monastery to that of an independent abbey. Three days later, an election was held to fill the office of abbot and Nivakoff was elected the first abbot of the community since the death of the last previous abbot in 1792.

== Charism and daily life ==
The monks' life of conversion is rooted in the traditional praying of the Divine Office seven times during the day and once during the night. The monks chant the full Office in Latin and offer the Holy Mass each day in the traditional form of the Roman Rite. The monks dedicate their prayers to those who have asked them for intercession, Church and world. The monks have shared their chants in many ways since the founding of their community, most notably in the release of a Billboard-topping album in 2015. Benedicta, the monks’ CD of Marian chants.

Following the Rule of Saint Benedict, the monks’ schedule of prayers follows the patterns of the sun, and therefore changes slightly throughout the year as the days wax and wane.

In accordance with Benedictine tradition, the monks regularly host visitors who come either for a retreat or to discern a vocation. The guests are welcome to join the monks for Conventual Mass every day according to the schedule published on the monastery website.

== Coat of arms ==
The monastery's coat of arms

The coat of arms of the monastery is divided into two sections. On the dexter hand side is the symbol of the Celestine monks, an ascetic branch of the Benedictines who were present in Norcia before being suppressed by the Napoleonic laws of 1810, so that the symbol represents the monastery's continuity with the past.

The sinister side of the shield is symbolic of the present: a stump with new shoots of life growing from it. The stump refers to the Benedictine monastic life at Norcia violently cut off in 1810. The new shoots of life represent the present community, and the three leaves represents the three original monks who arrived in Norcia in 2000. This image has always been a sign of hope and echoes, for example, the prophet Isaiah's looking forward to the coming of Christ: "There shall come forth a shoot from the stump of Jesse, and a branch shall grow out of his roots" (Isaiah 11:1).

In 2019, after breaking ground and beginning to raise the walls of their new home, the monks added a motto to the monastery's crest: Nova Facio Omnia. A quotation from the Latin of the Book of the Apocalypse (21:5), this text evokes the New Jerusalem in all its splendor and underlines what Christ does for all who cooperate with His plan: “Behold, I make all things new!”

== Birra Nursia ==
Early in 2012 the Monks of Norcia established a brewery in a renovated warehouse. They hosted a grand opening celebration on August 15, 2012 - the Solemnity of the Assumption of the Blessed Virgin Mary. The name of the beer is “Birra Nursia”, using the Latin name for the city of Norcia and the motto of the brewery “ut laetificet cor” (that the heart might be gladdened). The monks explain this motto as follows:

In complete harmony with this tradition, the monks of Norcia have sought to share with the world a product cultivated through this monastic logic, one that reminds us of the goodness of creation and the potential that it contains. For the monks of Norcia, beer has always been a beverage reserved for special occasions, such as Sundays and Feast days. The project of the monastic brewery was conceived with the hope of sharing with others the joy arising from the labor of their own hands, so that in all things the Lord and Creator of all may be glorified.

— birranursia.com

As of 2023, the monks produce three varieties of beer: Extra, a Belgian-style dark ale, Tripel, an amber beer, and Bionda, a blonde ale. Norcia is famous for many food products, including truffles, wild boar, salumi, and cheeses. The monks designed their beer to pair with such local delicacies. Many of the shops, hotels, and restaurants in town have begun selling Birra Nursia to their customers. As of March 2016, Birra Nursia is also available for purchase in the United States via the brewery website.

== See also ==
- Communities using the Tridentine Mass
- St Benedict Patron of Europe Association
