= Benedictines of Mary, Queen of Apostles =

Benedictine order of nuns

- Abbreviation: OSB
- Formation: c. AD 1995; 31 years ago
- Founder: Mother Mary Wilhelmina Lancaster, OSB
- Type: Catholic religious order
- Headquarters: Gower, Missouri, United States of America
- Website: benedictinesofmary.org

The Benedictines of Mary, Queen of Apostles, are a Benedictine order of nuns founded by Sr. Mary Wilhelmina Lancaster, OSB, in Gower, Missouri. The nuns are also choral singers, and their first two albums of recorded chants and hymns reached number one on the classical traditional Billboard charts. They were thereafter named Billboard's Classical Traditional artists of the year in 2013, the first community of nuns to win an award in the history of Billboard.

Their album sales have been used to improve the monastery and pay off the abbey's debt. The community also attends Mass in the traditional form and prays the 1962 Monastic Breviary.

== History ==
The community was established in 1995 as a small order of Benedictine nuns under the auspices of the Priestly Fraternity of St. Peter, who are based in Scranton, Pennsylvania. They were founded by Sr Mary Wilhelmina Lancaster OSB, an African-American nun formerly part of the Oblate Sisters of Providence (founded by Mother Mary Lange in 1829 as the first-ever black religious order in America).

Wilhelmina had found her traditional tastes incompatible with the Oblates' changing ethos, and decided to start her own community. Her new group of sisters were originally called the Oblates of Mary, Queen of Apostles, and began following a monastic horarium defined in the Rule of Saint Benedict, and chanting the Divine Office in Latin according to the 1962 Breviarium Monasticum. Wilhelmina's body was found to be incorruptible in 2023, and have since been moved to a glass box in the church where a steady stream of pilgrims have continued to visit.

Upon his arrival in the Diocese of Kansas City-Saint Joseph in 2005, Bishop Robert Finn said that vocations to the priesthood and religious life would be seen as a "super-priority" for his diocese. In March 2006, Finn invited the order to his diocese. The nuns relocated to Gower, Missouri and were established as a public association of the faithful with the new name "Benedictines of Mary, Queen of Apostles". In September 2018, its priory was raised to an abbey and their new abbey church was consecrated by Bishop Robert Finn. Mother Cecilia was the first abbess to receive the abbatial blessing according to the traditional Pontificale in the United States.

In 2019, the order has expanded with eight nuns coming to Ava, Missouri. In 2021 the Benedictines bought a land to build a new monastery of St. Joseph with a Fathers Shrine. The nuns moved into the priory in 2024. In the same year, the Benedictines of Mary, Queen of Apostles expanded outside of the US after one of the sisters was refused a green card and was sent to stay in Europe with two other nuns. Archbishop Longley, having been informed of the situation, proposed that the Benedictines settle in his diocese permanently. Answering the bishop's offer, they acquired the closed Benedictine Colwich Abbey, the monastery founded by Thomas More’s great-great-granddaughter. In 2024 they were also invited by Bishop Siegel into their third location in the United States, that is Evansville, Indiana, the monastery of St. Anne that was previously used by Poor Clares.

== Recordings ==
The nuns sing together daily, typically for five hours per day, as part of their daily life of prayer. The group have released a number of recordings of their songs. Their debut recording Advent At Ephesus, released at the end of 2012, reached number 2 on Billboard's Classical Traditional Music Chart and number 14 on the Classical Music Overall Chart. They were named Billboard's Classical Traditional Artist 2012 and 2013, the first order of nuns to win an award in the history of Billboard magazine.

Both their first two albums of their recorded chants and hymns reached number 1 on the classical traditional Billboard charts in 2013. As of 9 August 2013, the group's second album Angels and Saints at Ephesus reached the number 1 position on the Billboard traditional classical albums chart for 13 weeks, a record duration on that chart since 2006. As of July 2013, the album also reached number 3 on Billboard's Bestselling Internet Album Chart, number 7 on its Contemporary Christian and Christian Gospel charts, and number 127 on the "Billboard 200" weekly ranking of the 200 highest-selling music albums and EPs in the United States. The album has sold 49,000 copies in the United States as of February 2015.

Album sales have been used to improve the monastery and pay off the abbey's debt. The music was arranged by the abbess Mother Cecilia as of 2014.

== Discography ==
- Marian Hymns at Ephesus, self-published, released 2009
- Christmas at Ephesus, self-published, released 2011
- Advent at Ephesus, De Montfort Music/Decca Records, released 20 November 2012
- Angels and Saints at Ephesus, De Montfort Music/Decca Records, released 7 May 2013
- Lent at Ephesus, De Montfort Music/Decca Records/Universal Music Classics, released 11 February 2014
- Easter at Ephesus, De Montfort Music/Decca Records/Universal Music Classics, released 3 March 2015
- Adoration at Ephesus, self-published, released 26 April 2016
- Caroling at Ephesus, self-published, released 1 November 2016
- The Hearts of Jesus, Mary & Joseph at Ephesus, self-published, released 1 May 2018
- Christ the King at Ephesus, self-published, released 26 October 2021
- Tenebrae at Ephesus, self-published, released 08 April 2022
- The Holy Trinity at Ephesus, self-published, released 11 November 2022
- Sister Wilhelmina at Ephesus, self-published, released 31 March 2024
- Martyrs at Ephesus, self-published, released 31 March 2024
