= Carminucci =

Carminucci is an Italian surname. Notable people with the surname include:

- Giovanni Carminucci (1939–2007), Italian gymnast
- Pasquale Carminucci (1937–2015), Italian gymnast, brother of Giovanni
