= San Benedetto del Tronto Lighthouse =

San Benedetto del Tronto
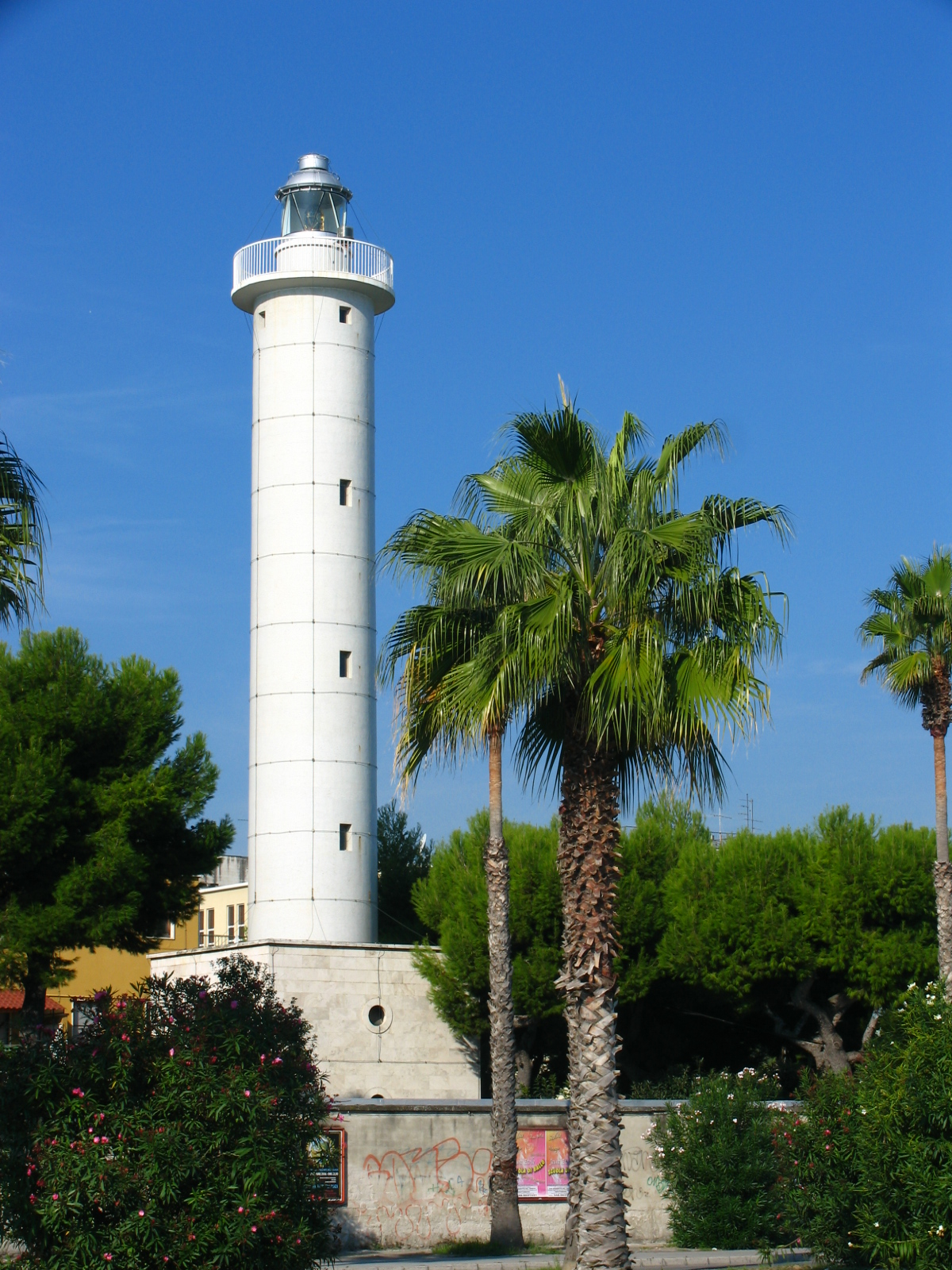
- San Benedetto del Tronto Lighthouse
- Location: San Benedetto del Tronto; Marche; Italy
- Coordinates: 42°57′10″N 13°53′10″E

Tower
- Constructed: 1957
- Foundation: concrete base
- Construction: concrete tower
- Automated: yes
- Height: 31 metres (102 ft)
- Shape: cylindrical tower with gallery and lantern rising from a 2-storey keeper's house
- Markings: white tower, grey metallic lantern dome
- Power source: mains electricity
- Operator: Marina Militare

Light
- Focal height: 31 metres (102 ft)
- Lens: Type OR D4
- Intensity: main: AL 1000 W reserve: LABI 100 W
- Range: main: 22 nautical miles (41 km; 25 mi) reserve: 18 nautical miles (33 km; 21 mi)
- Characteristic: Fl (2) W 10s.
- Italy no.: 3898 E.F.

San Benedetto del Tronto Lighthouse (Italian: Faro di San Benedetto del Tronto) is an active lighthouse located on the waterfront of San Benedetto del Tronto, Marche on the Adriatic Sea.

== Description ==
The lighthouse, built in 1957, consists of a concrete cylindrical tower, 31 metres (102 ft) high, with balcony and lantern rising from a 2-storey yellow keeper's house. The lantern is painted in white, the lantern dome in grey metallic, and is positioned at 31 metres (102 ft) above sea level and emits two white flashes in a 10 seconds period visible up to a distance of 22 nautical miles (41 km; 25 mi). The lighthouse is completely automated and operated by the Marina Militare with the identification code number 3898 E.F.

== See also ==
- List of lighthouses in Italy
- San Benedetto del Tronto
