= Enzo Eusebi =

Italian engineer, architect and designer

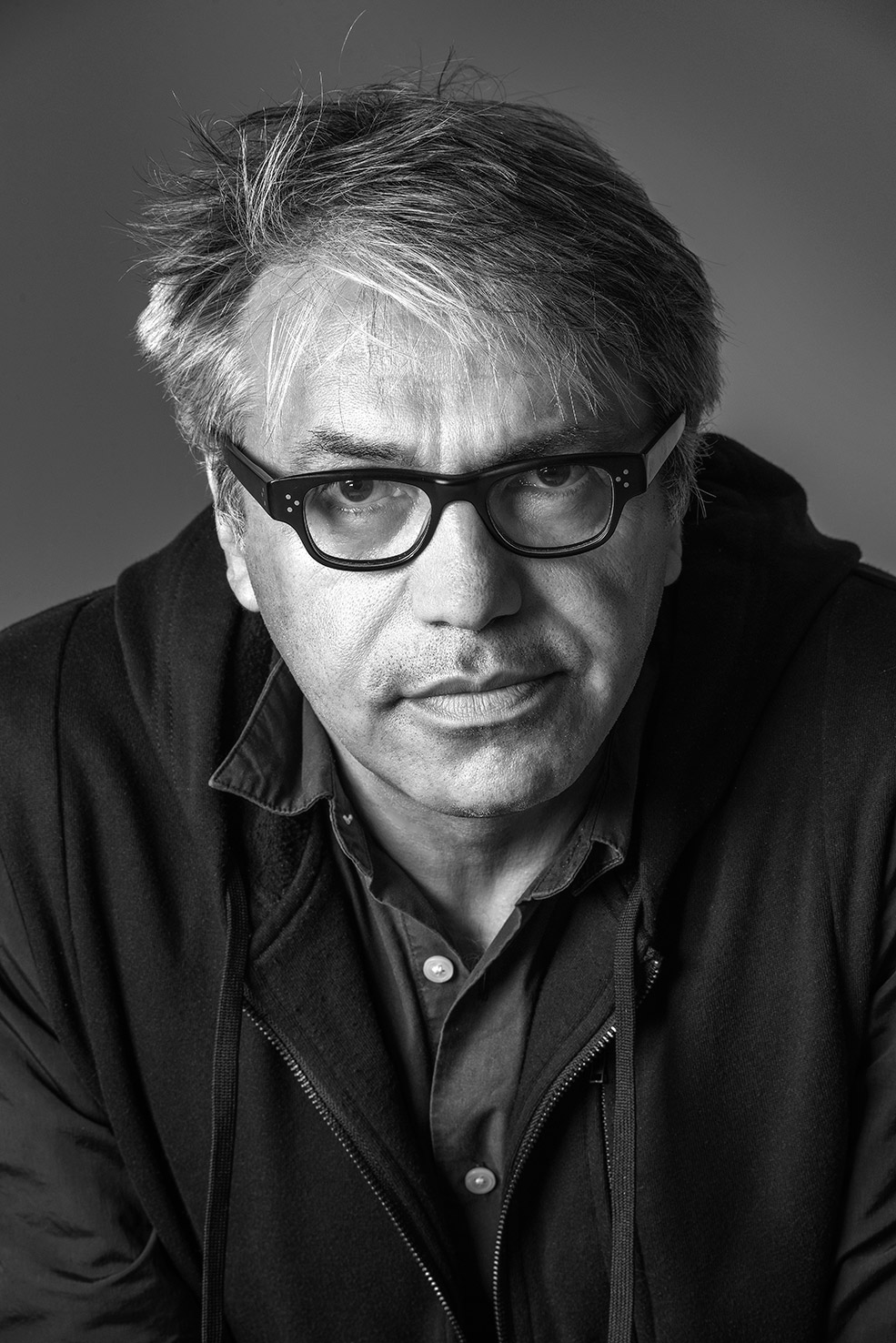
- Enzo Eusebi in 2015
- Born: Vincenzo Eusebi; 29 January 1960 (age 66); San Benedetto del Tronto, Italy
- Education: Marche Polytechnic University
- Occupation: Architect
- Practice: NOTHING STUDIO

Vincenzo Eusebi (Italian pronunciation: [ˈɛntso euˈzɛːbi]; born 29 January 1960) is an Italian engineer, architect and designer. Eusebi studied engineering and architecture at the Marche Polytechnic University in Ancona.

Eusebi is the founding partner of NOTHING STUDIO, an atelier of architecture, planning, interior design, design and graphics. He is also one of the founders of Libera Università dei Diritti Umani.

== Life and career ==
Eusebi was born in San Benedetto del Tronto in 1960. He moved to Beijing in 2003 and began working on what would become the Kunlun Towers, erected in 2005.

Eusebi participated in the Saint Petersburg Design Week 2014, the Tientsin Design Week 2014, and was selected for an award in artistic direction and design of the World Association of Agricultural Engineers for the Expo 2015 in Milan.

One of his works was a prosciutto-processing plant in the countryside near Preci that was partially sunk into the earth.

He is married and has two daughters.

== Works ==
- Eusebi, Enzo (2008). Fortunato D'Amico (ed.). Not For…. Milano: Electa. ISBN 978-88-370-6556-0.
- Eusebi, Enzo (2008). Nothing Studio. Milano: L'Arca Edizioni. ISBN 978-88-7838-154-4. OCLC 632293684.
