= Pierluigi Camiscioni =

Italian rugby union player (1953–2020)

Pierluigi Camiscioni (30 May 1953 – 27 August 2020) was an Italian rugby union player and stuntman. He played for L'Aquila Rugby.

Camiscioni began his international career at Gosforth against an England under-23 team. His best year was 1976, when he played in five internationals. With L'Aquila, he won the 1982 Italian Championship. He died at San Benedetto del Tronto, after a long illness.
