= Pasquale Carminucci =

Italian artistic gymnast

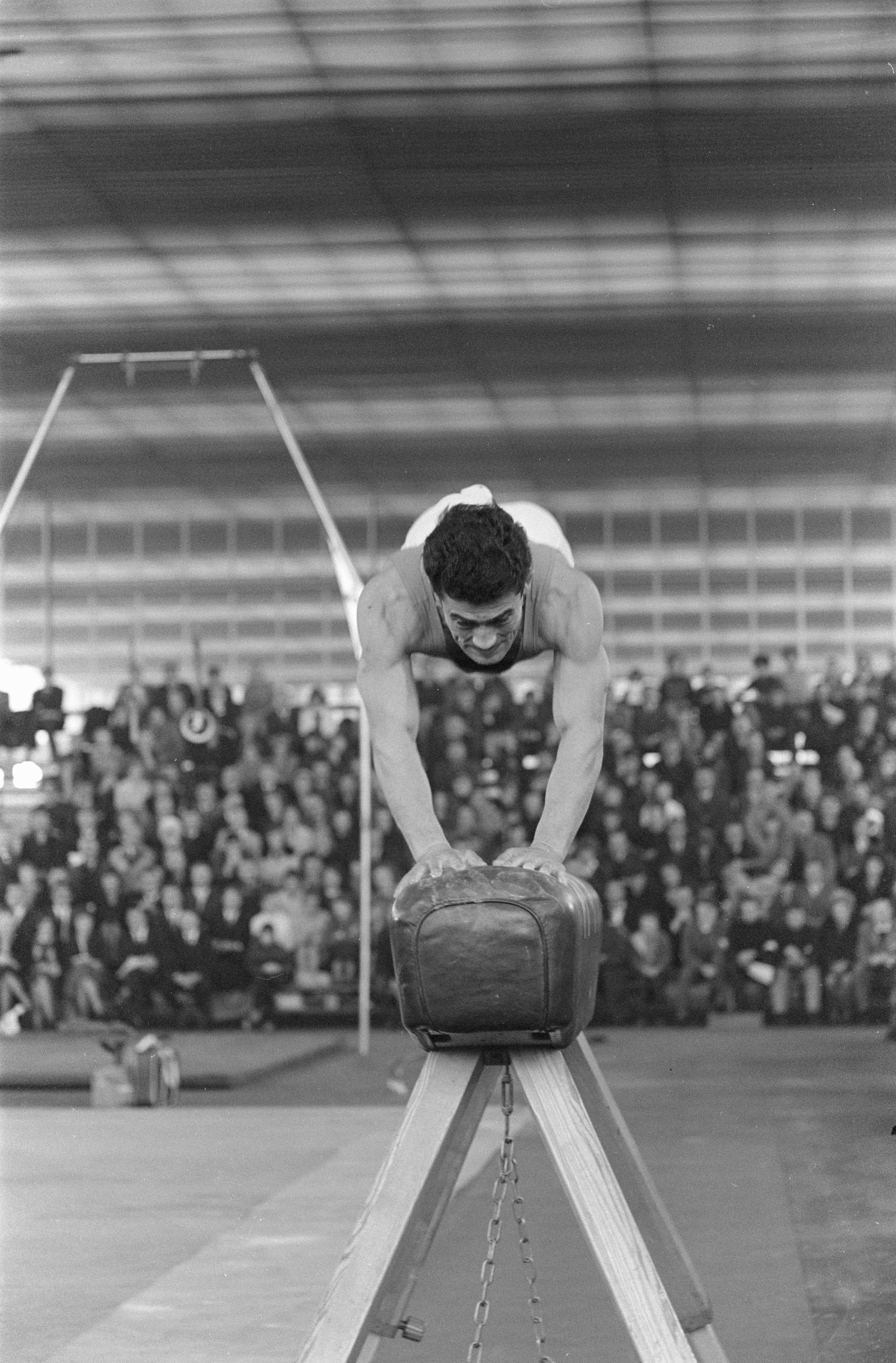
- Born: 29 August 1937 San Benedetto del Tronto, Kingdom of Italy
- Died: 22 February 2015 (aged 77) Rome, Italy
- Height: 1.63 m (5 ft 4 in)
- Relatives: Giovanni Carminucci (brother)

Gymnastics career
- Discipline: Men's artistic gymnastics
- Country represented: Italy
- Club: Gruppo Sportivo Vigili del Fuoco "Giancarlo Brunetti" Roma
Medal record
Men's artistic gymnastics
Representing Italy
Olympic Games
Bronze medal – third place	1960 Rome	Team

Pasquale Carminucci (29 August 1937 – 22 February 2015) was an Italian gymnast. He was the brother of Giovanni Carminucci and participated in three editions of the Summer Olympics, 1960, 1964 and 1968.

He was born in San Benedetto del Tronto. He won the bronze medal in all-around with the Italian national team at the 1960 Summer Olympics.
