= San Benedetto del Tronto =

City and comune in Marche, Italy

- Comune
- Città di San Benedetto del Tronto
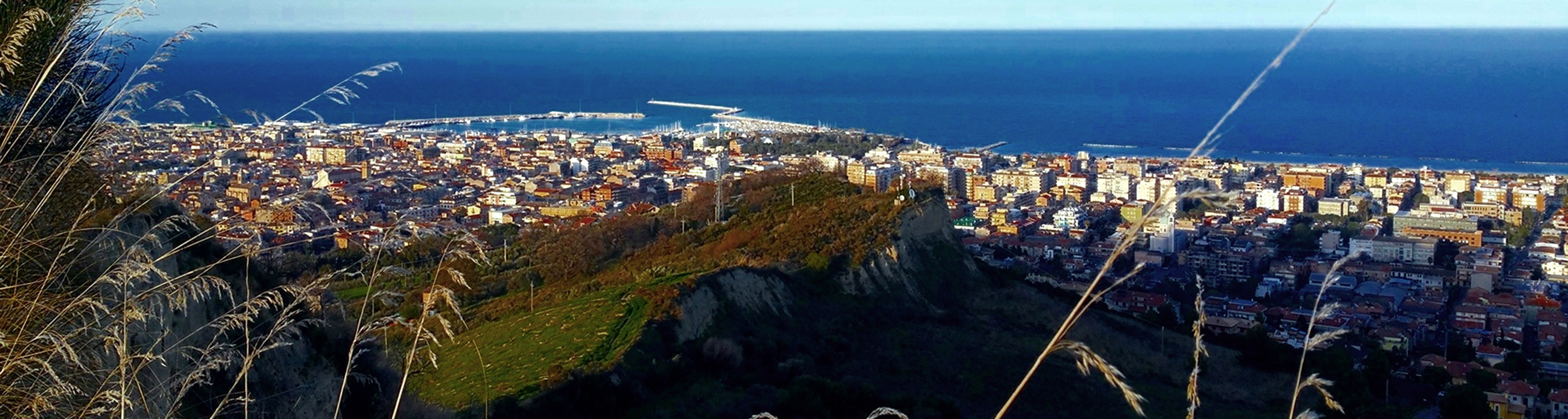
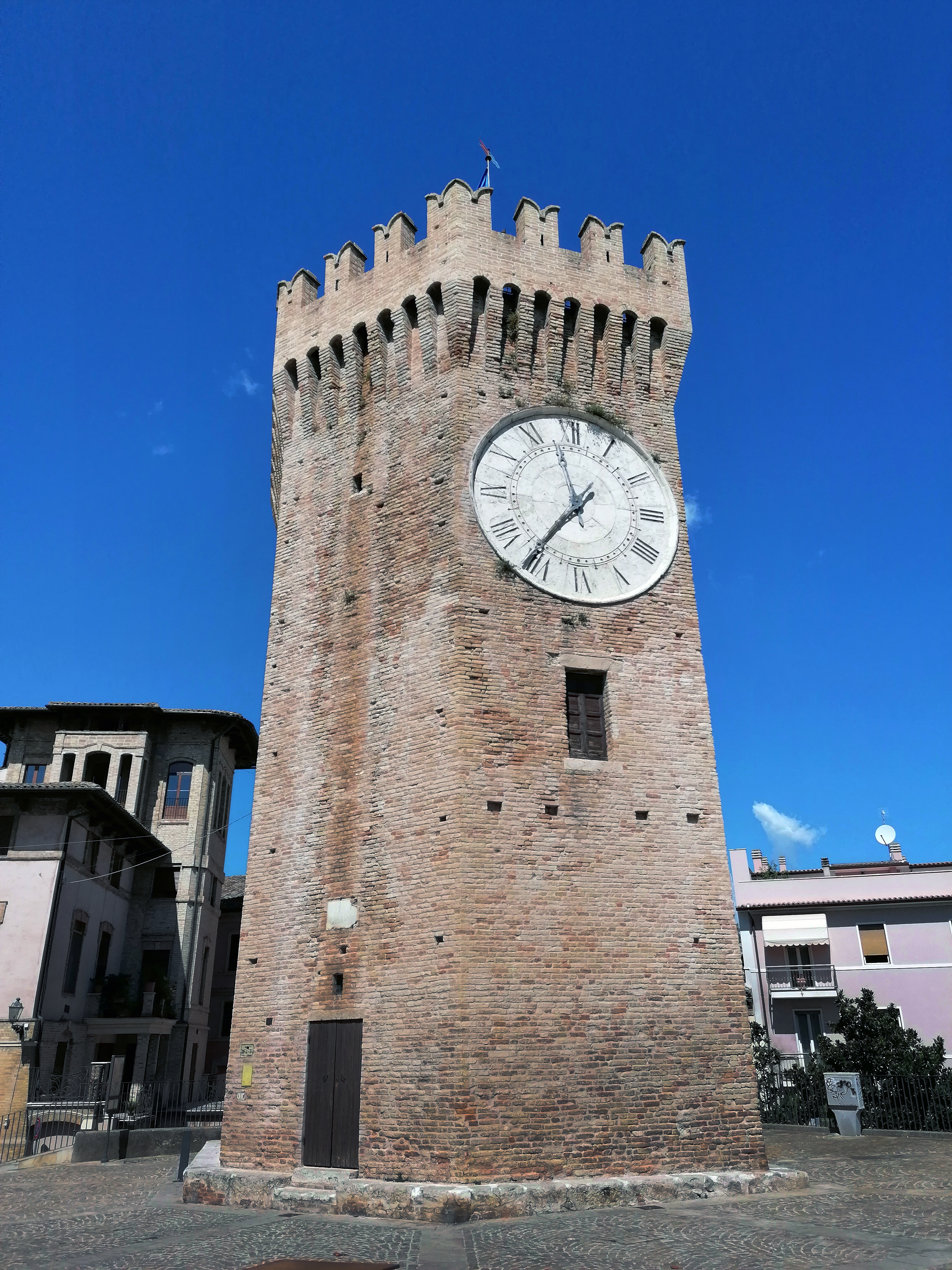
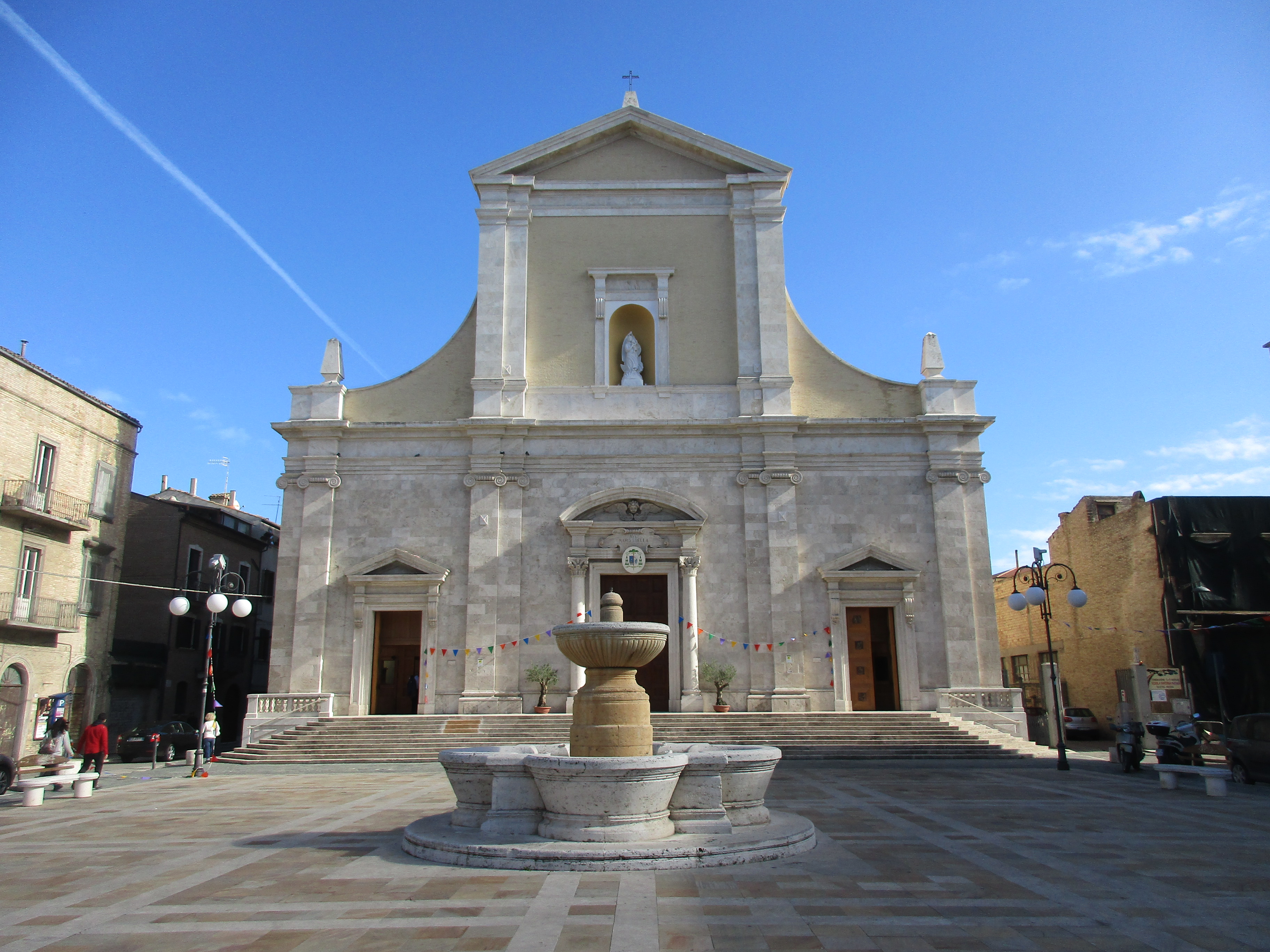
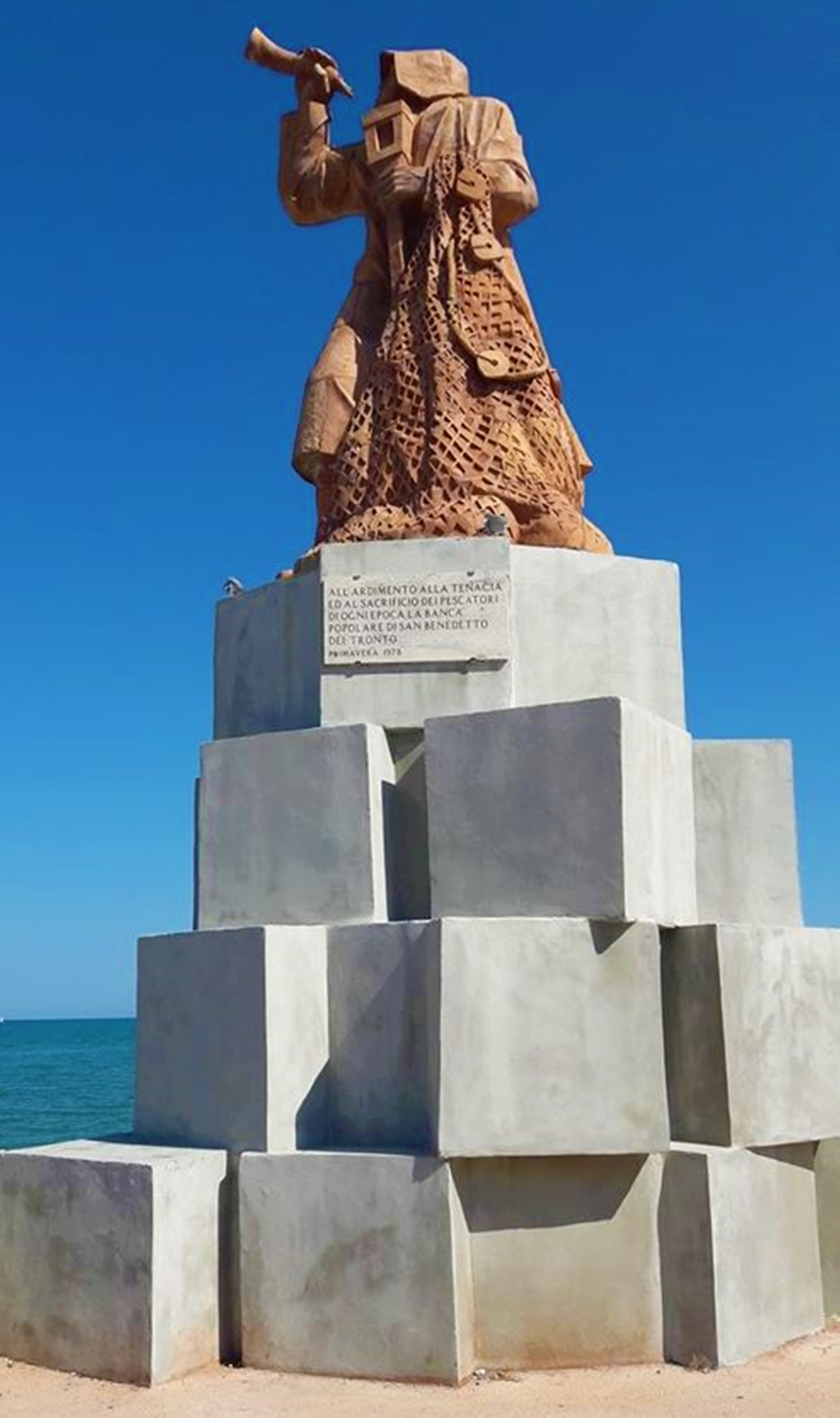
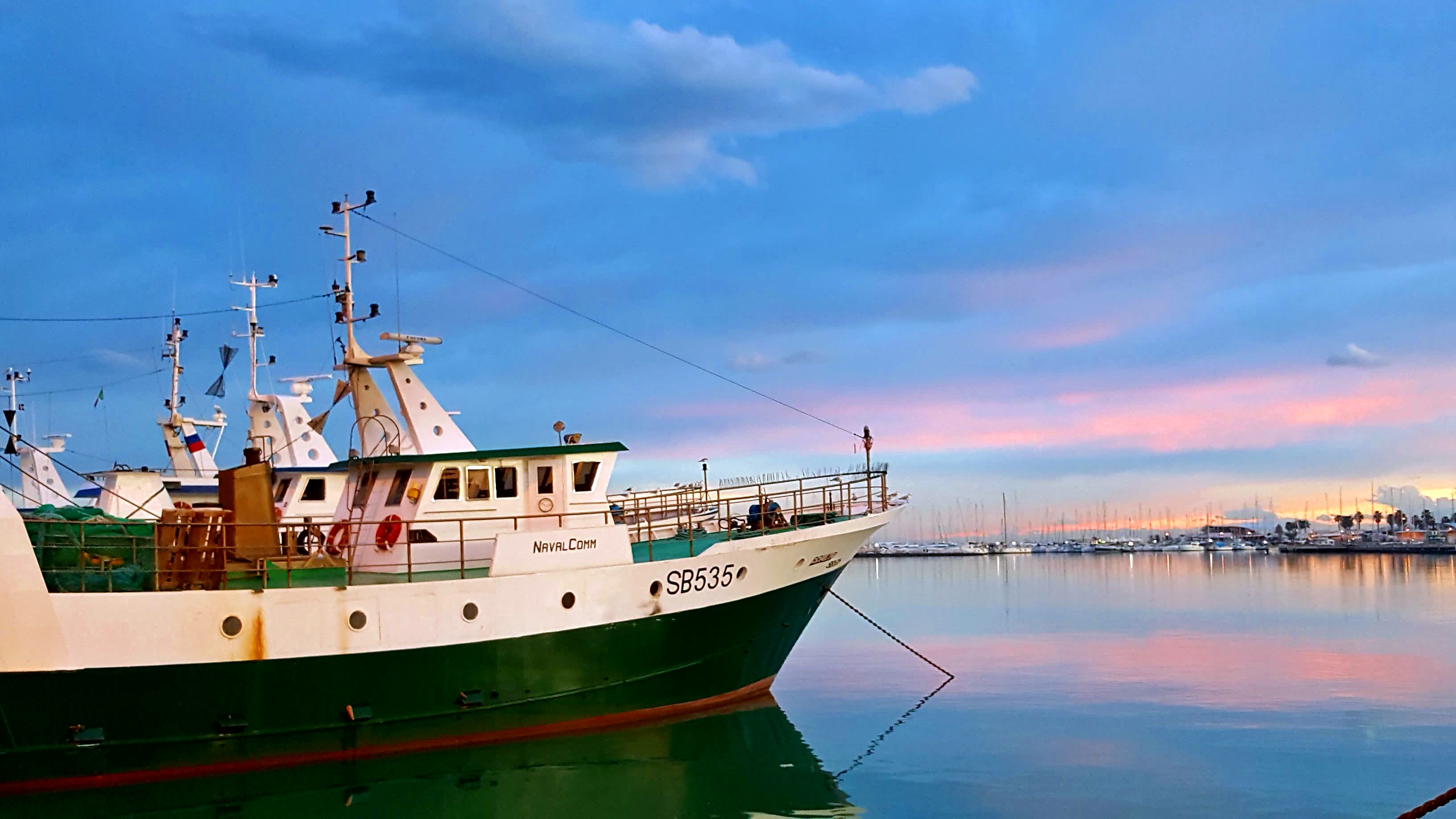
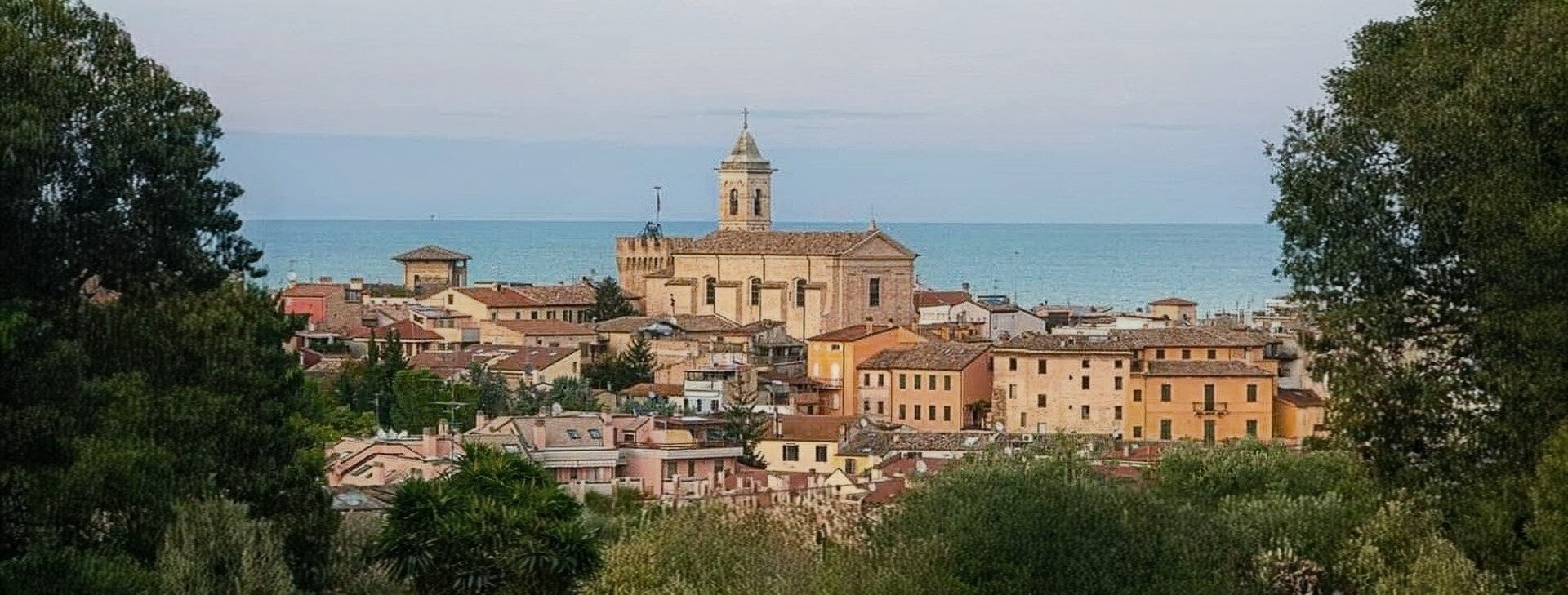
- Panoramic of the city The Gualtieri Tower Madonna della Marina Cathedral Monument to the Fisherman Fishing boats moored on the quay View of the medieval village

- Flag

- San Benedetto within the Province of Ascoli

- Location within Italy Location within Marche
- Coordinates: 42°57′N 13°53′E
- Country: Italy
- Region: Marche
- Province: Ascoli Piceno (AP)

Government
  - Mayor: Nicola Mozzoni (Centre-right politics)

Area
  - Total: 25.30 km^{2} (9.77 sq mi)
- Highest elevation: 282 m (925 ft)
- Lowest elevation: 0 m (0 ft)

Population (31 July 2026)
  - Total: 47 122
  - Density: 1.9/km^{2} (4.8/sq mi)
- Demonym: Sambenedettesi
- Time zone: UTC+1 (CET)
  - Summer (DST): UTC+2 (CEST)
- Postal code: 63074
- Dialing code: 0735
- Patron saint: San Benedetto Martire
- Saint day: 13 October
- Website: Official website

San Benedetto del Tronto is a city and comune in Marche, Italy. Part of an urban area with 100,000 inhabitants, it is one of the most densely populated areas along the Adriatic Sea coast. It is the most populated city in Province of Ascoli Piceno, with 47,122 (July 2026). Its port is one of the biggest on the Adriatic; it is the most important centre of Riviera of the Palms, with over 8,000 Phoenix canariensis, Washingtonia and P. sylvestris plants. San Benedetto del Tronto's economy depends on tourism, aimed above all at families.

== History ==
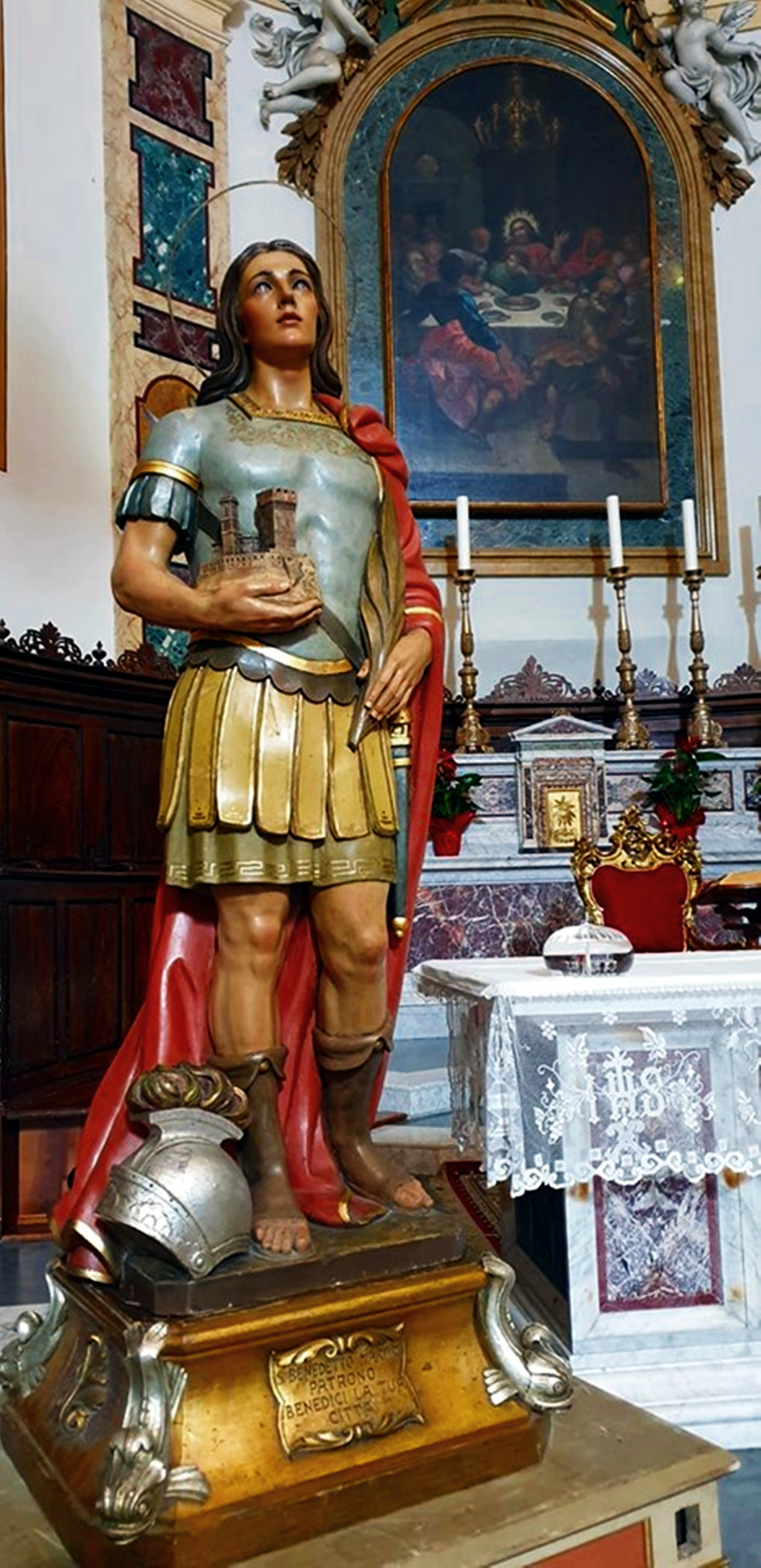
The statue of San Benedetto (4th century), the patron saint of the city

San Benedetto del Tronto was a martyr and a soldier born in Cupra during the reign of Roman Emperor Diocletian. Shortly thereafter, following the edict of Constantine in 313 AD, some believers built a chapel around the tomb. Since then, San Benedetto has been highly revered by locals. He later built a small church which included an apse facing the east and its entrance facing the west, in accordance with the early Christian tradition that the east, where the sun rises, and the sunrise is symbolic of Christ's resurrection. Historians argue that archaeological findings indicate Roman origins, linking San Benedetto to the ancient city of Alba Picena on the right bank of the Albula river.

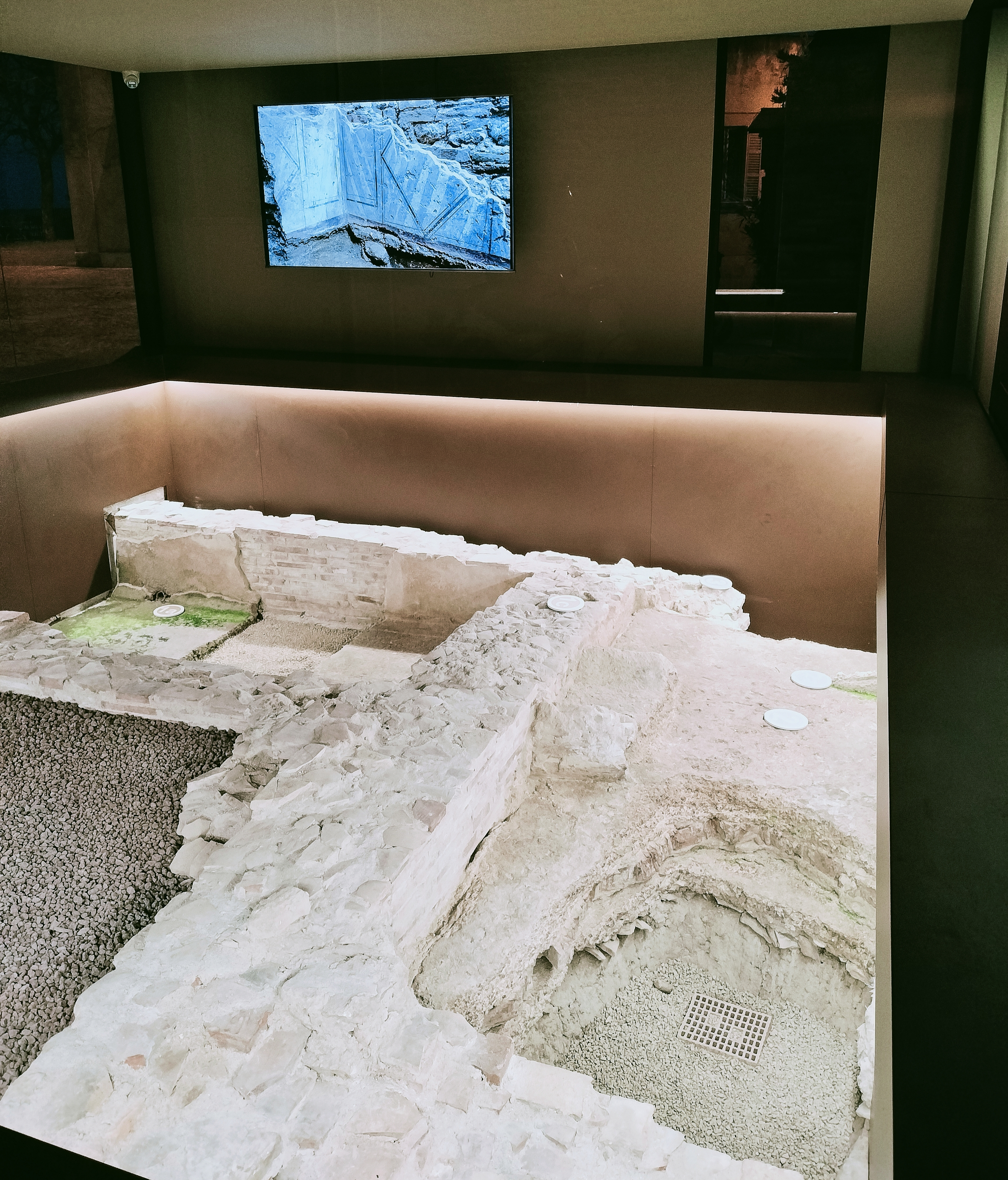
View of the remains of Villa Marittima

The first settlements date back to the 1st century BC, as demonstrated by the archaeological discovery of the maritime villa near the ancient settlement of medieval village. The first document which indicated the name of the village dates from 998. The document was an act concerning the investiture of the benefice of SS. Vincent and Anastasius in the territory of Acquaviva Piceno by Hubert bishop of Fermo. The document contains the phrase "Pede sive terra et silva Sancti Benedicti", referring to the city. In 1211, Emperor Otto IV granted the territories ranging from the Tronto River to the Potenza river to the town of Fermo. In 1245, Emperor Frederick II granted Ascoli Piceno a stretch of coast between the Ragnola river and Tronto river to build a fortified port. In the following years, there were disputes between Ascoli and Fermo. In 1478, there was a plague epidemic which decimated the city's population. The area remained virtually uninhabited until refugees from Romagna repopulated San Benedetto where they were granted land leases. From the 16th century until the 19th century, the Turks repeatedly invaded the city where they captured sailors and forced them into slavery. Since 1650, the urban center expanded beyond the city walls. In 1754, the first marine suburbs, Sant'Antonio da Padova and Marina, were created. In 1860, the "Cacciatori delle Alpi" freed the city from the dominion of the church. The Royal Decree giving San Benedetto the "del Tronto" attribute was in 1896. In 1936, the village of Porto d'Ascoli was absorbed into the city of San Benedetto del Tronto.

During Second World War, the city suffered 144 air raids and 6 naval bombardments. Following the end of the war, the city's economy and businesses prospered. Fishing became a cornerstone of the local economy and in the 1960s and 1970s, the city became one of the largest national fishing ports. After the war, San Benedetto became a tourist destination on the Adriatic coast.

== Geography ==
=== Location ===
San Benedetto del Tronto rises on the shores of the Adriatic Sea and is located about 28 km east of Ascoli Piceno. It is the southernmost coastal town in the Marche region. The municipal territory extends for 25.30 km^{2} and has the conformation of a coastal hill, with an altitude level between 0 and 282 height above sea level in the "Barattelle" contrada, it extends for 9.3 km along the coast of the middle Adriatic, of which 1.7 km in the protected natural area of the "Sentina".

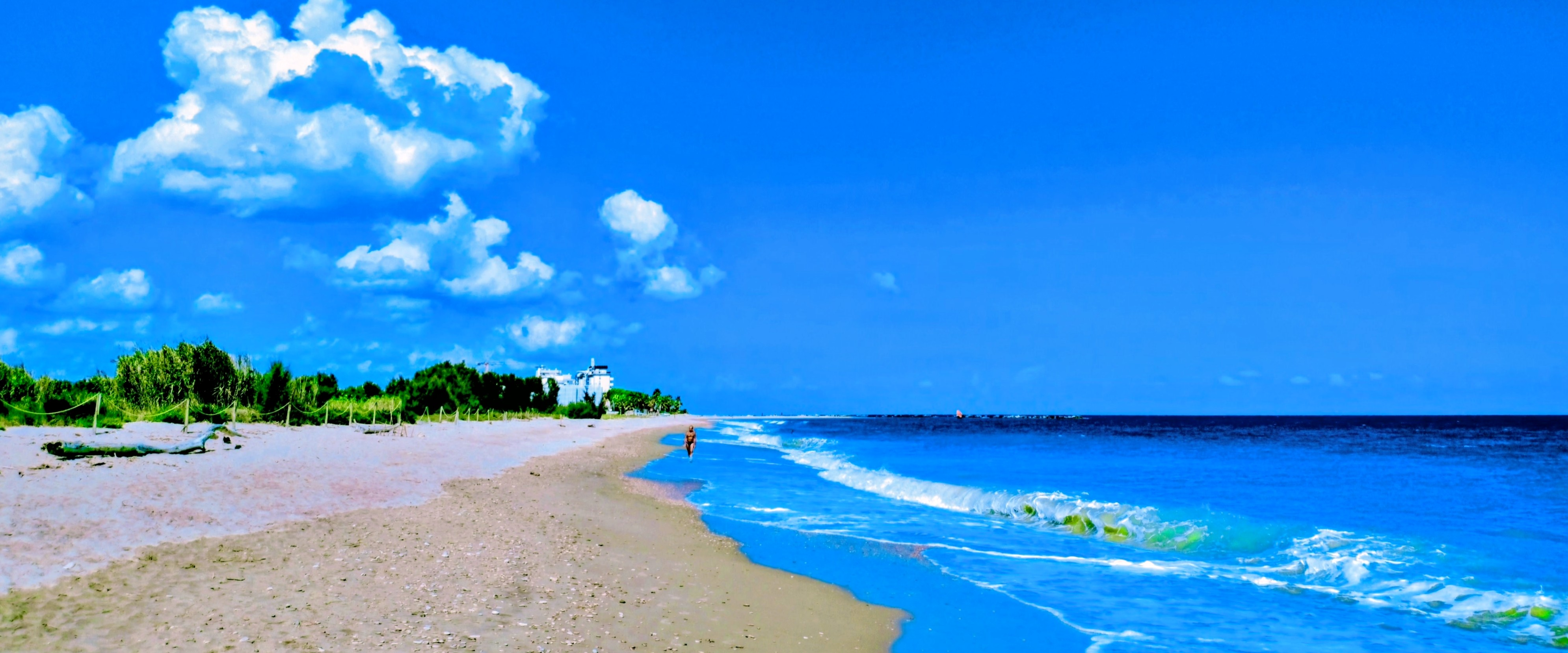
View of the coastline of the Sentina nature reserve

The city has an ancient nucleus (the "high country" or "su dèntrë" in Sambenedettese) on a modest relief not far from the sea, at the foot of which develops the original settlement of the most recent part "Coast". This is crossed by the Albula torrent and has developed over the years up to the river Tronto, to the south, incorporating the locality Porto d'Ascoli, while at north it joins with the Ischia district of Grottammare, with which it constitutes a single urban agglomeration that reaches almost until Tesino. Southwest following the river bank Tronto merges with the Centobuchi, a frazione of Monteprandone. The municipality borders with Acquaviva Picena, Grottammare, Martinsicuro (TE) and Monteprandone. The municipality of San Benedetto del Tronto and the neighboring municipalities of Grottammare, Acquaviva Picena, Monteprandone, Colonnella and Martinsicuro are a single urban entity there being a solution of continuity between the settlements. This agglomeration has undergone a considerable and constant development since the post-war period to the present day: in 1951 it had 47.337 inhabitants, 70.140 in 1971, 96.012 in 2007 and 100.611 in July 2010 distributed on a territory of 125 km^{2} and with a population density of 805 ab / km^{2}. However, the Metropolitan area (or region) of San Benedetto del Tronto, based on commuter flows and identified with the 'Functional Urban Regions' (FURs) methodology, is much larger. According to this methodology, all the neighboring municipalities that have at least 10% commuting rate towards it must be aggregated to the metropolitan pole. The metropolitan area of San Benedetto del Tronto thus reaches a population of 175,818 inhabitants, distributed in 23 municipalities within a radius of 15 km (including Martinsicuro, Grottammare, Alba Adriatica, Monteprandone and Tortoreto) from the city over a territory of 472 km^{2} and with a population density of 366 inhabitants / km^{2}.

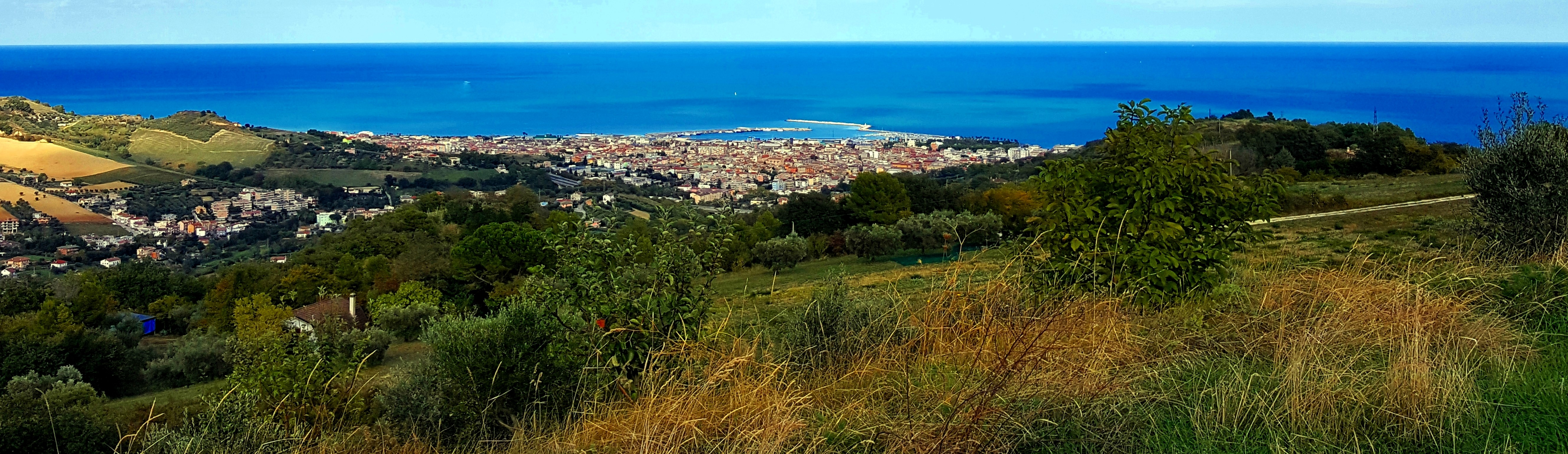
Panorama view of the city of San Benedetto del Tronto on the Adriatic Sea from the surrounding hills

=== Climate ===
San Benedetto enjoys a particularly benign Mediterranean climate, with mild winters (7 °C or so of seasonal medium), and they are moderately rainy, but snow often makes its appearance, also managing to periodically cover the city with a moderate white covering. This event is favored by the establishment of an active depression on the Ionian, which draws cold air from the Balkans. In the months between December and February, the "sambendettese" coast, like the entire Adriatic coast, is under the influence of currents from the northeast or the east, from the Buran, a typical wind of the East European Plain, bringing cold and frost characterized by discrete accumulations of snow on the coasts. The snowfall of March 12, 1956, and the relative cold wave represent a meteorological event of particular importance, it was called the "nevone". Other snow phenomena of significant importance were in January 1985 and 1986, and the recent snowfalls of 2012, 2018. The hot Summer's, but not sultry (about 23 °C of seasonal average), rarely exceed maximum temperatures over 32 °C. The average annual temperature is about 15 °C while the Precipitation are generally between 700 and 800 mm.

Climate data for San Benedetto del Tronto
| Month | Jan | Feb | Mar | Apr | May | Jun | Jul | Aug | Sep | Oct | Nov | Dec | Year |
|---|---|---|---|---|---|---|---|---|---|---|---|---|---|
| Mean daily maximum °C (°F) | 9.4 (48.9) | 11.1 (52.0) | 13.7 (56.7) | 17.5 (63.5) | 21.6 (70.9) | 25.9 (78.6) | 29.0 (84.2) | 28.6 (83.5) | 25.2 (77.4) | 20.3 (68.5) | 15.2 (59.4) | 11.5 (52.7) | 19.1 (66.4) |
| Daily mean °C (°F) | 6.2 (43.2) | 7.4 (45.3) | 9.8 (49.6) | 13.2 (55.8) | 17.2 (63.0) | 21.3 (70.3) | 24.0 (75.2) | 23.6 (74.5) | 20.6 (69.1) | 16.3 (61.3) | 11.8 (53.2) | 8.2 (46.8) | 15.0 (59.0) |
| Mean daily minimum °C (°F) | 3.0 (37.4) | 3.8 (38.8) | 6.0 (42.8) | 9.0 (48.2) | 12.8 (55.0) | 16.8 (62.2) | 19.0 (66.2) | 16.7 (62.1) | 16.1 (61.0) | 12.3 (54.1) | 8.5 (47.3) | 4.9 (40.8) | 10.9 (51.6) |
| Average precipitation mm (inches) | 63 (2.5) | 52 (2.0) | 63 (2.5) | 60 (2.4) | 51 (2.0) | 42 (1.7) | 56 (2.2) | 71 (2.8) | 82 (3.2) | 86 (3.4) | 80 (3.1) | 58 (2.3) | 757 (29.8) |
Source: CLIMATE-DATA.ORG

== Main sights ==
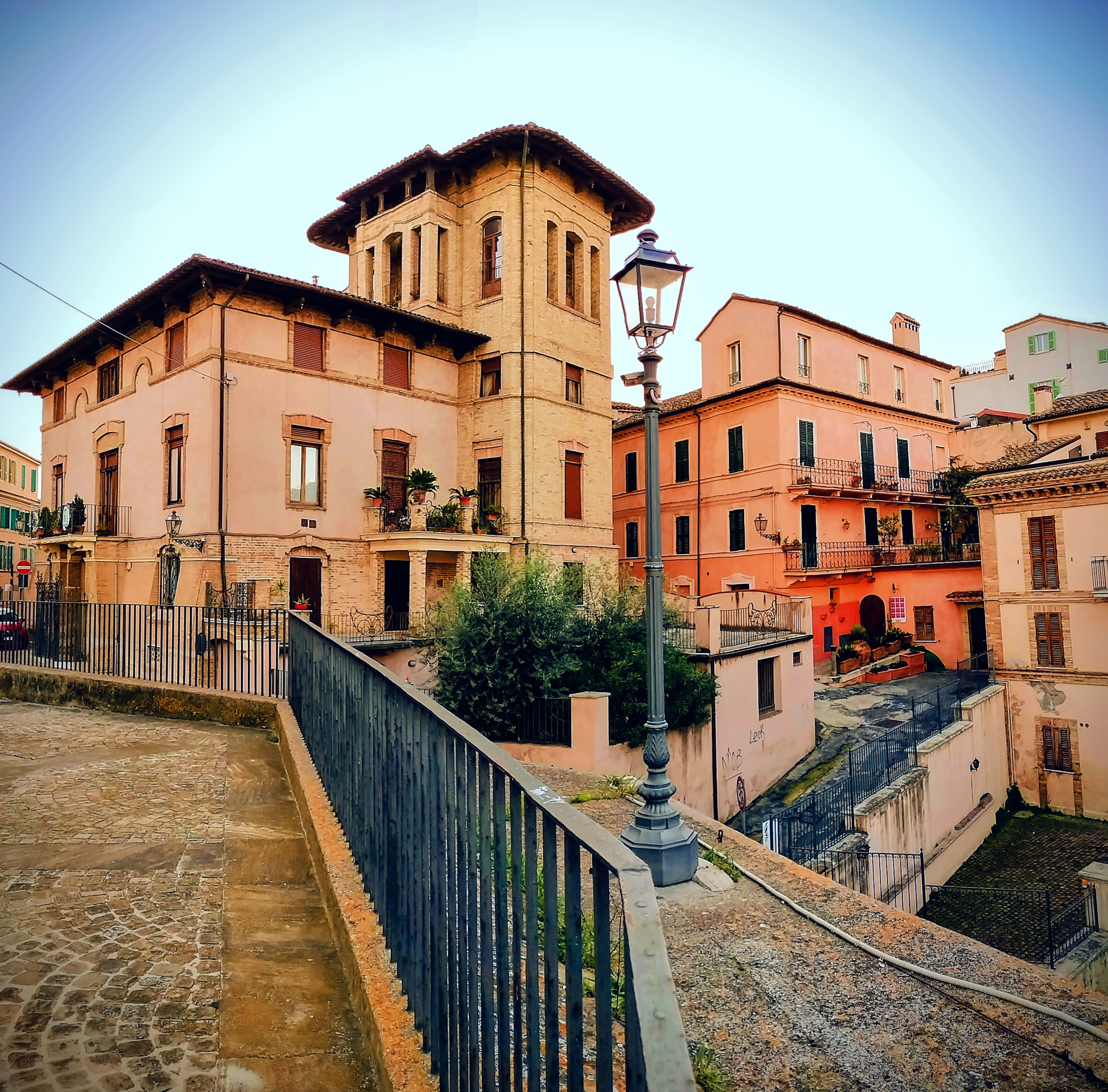
Glimpse of the ancient house

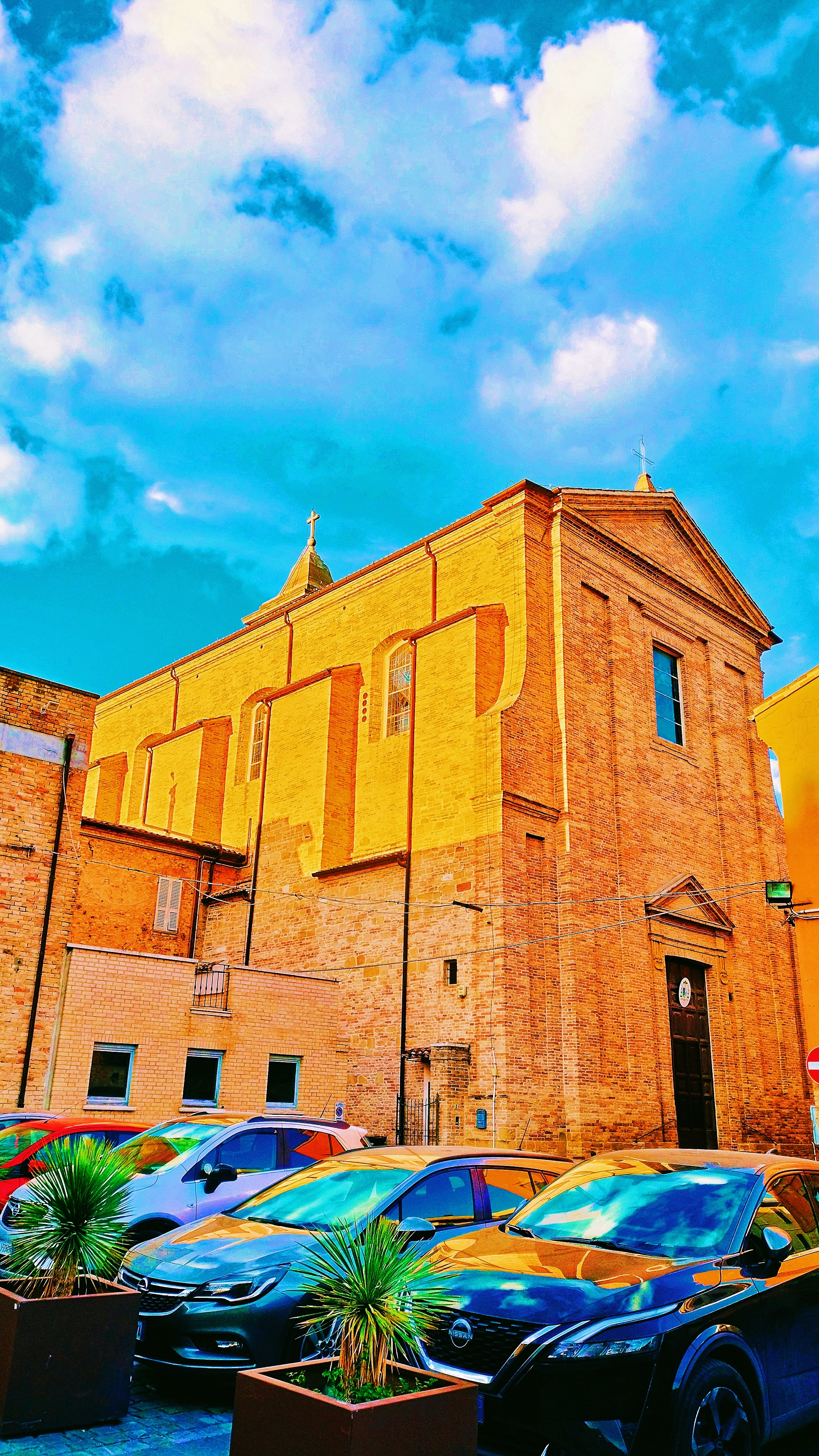
Church of San Benedetto Martire

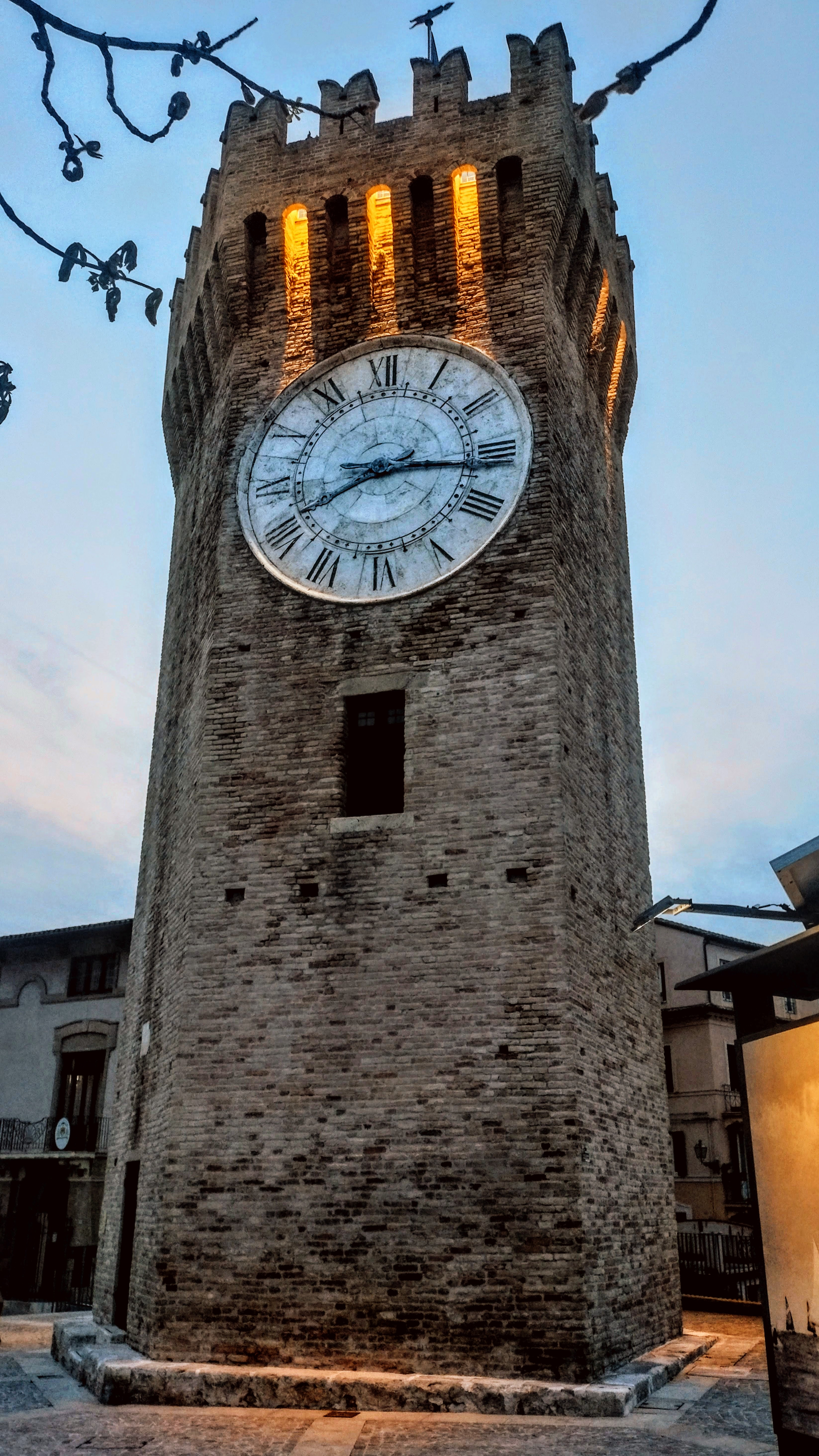
The Gualtieri tower

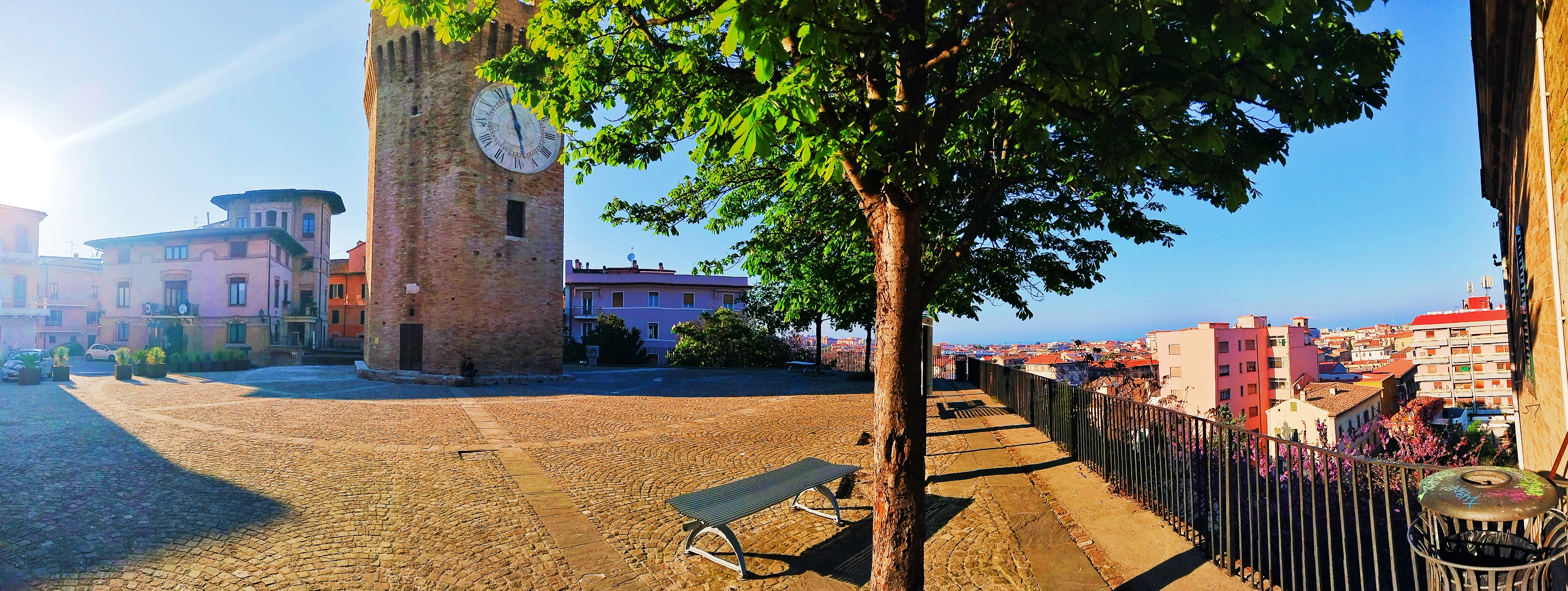
The Giuseppe Sacconi square

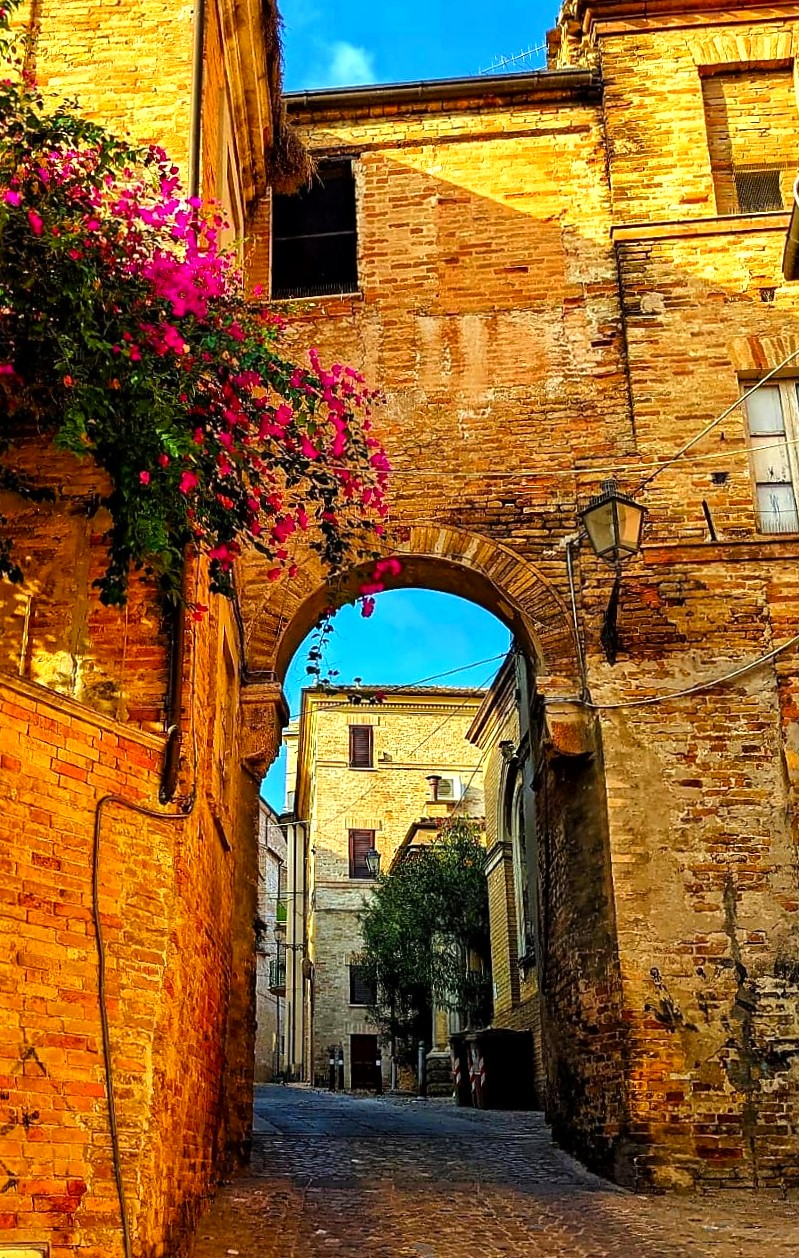
Sea gate of the castle

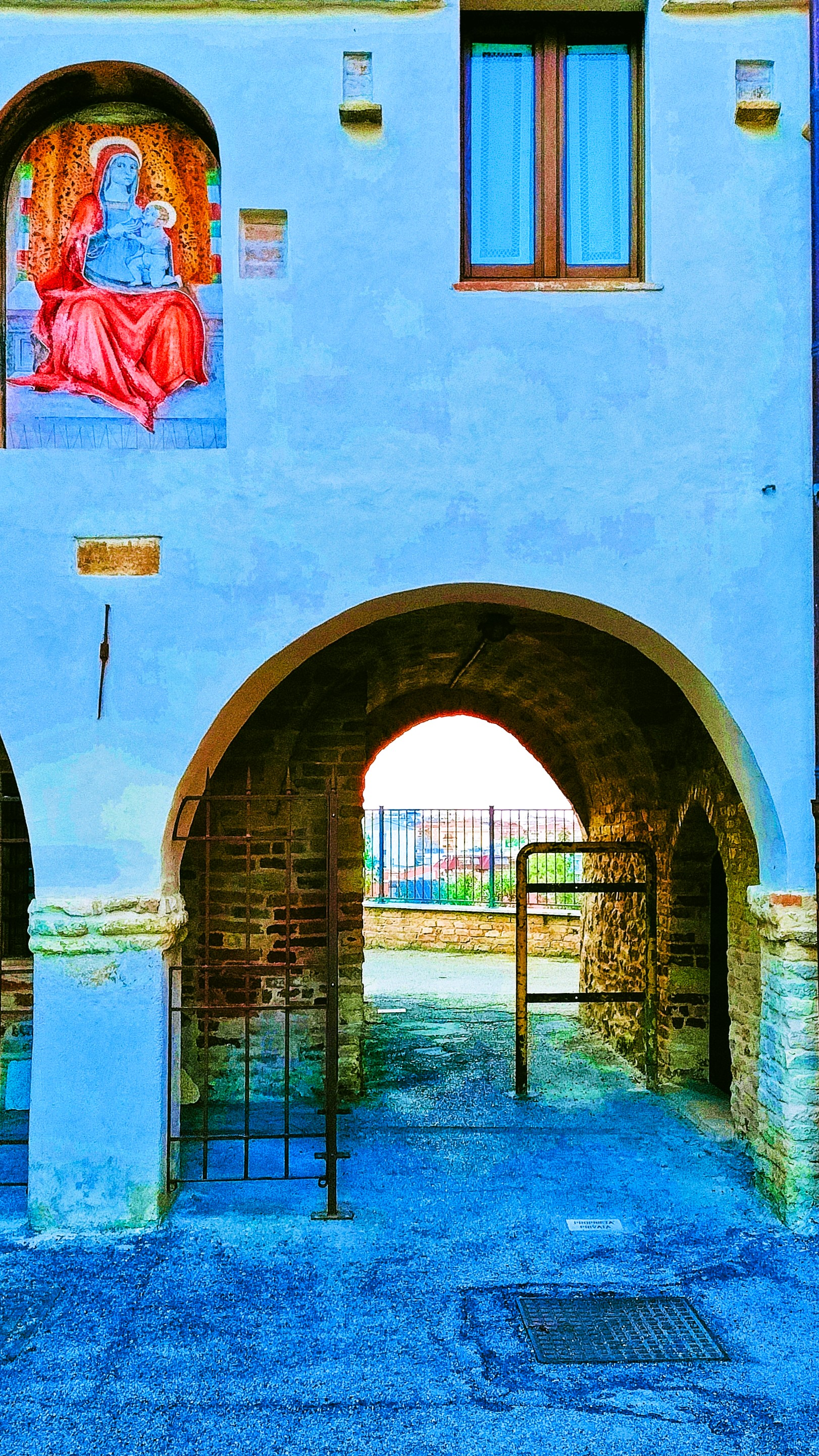
View of the Ancient Gate of the castle

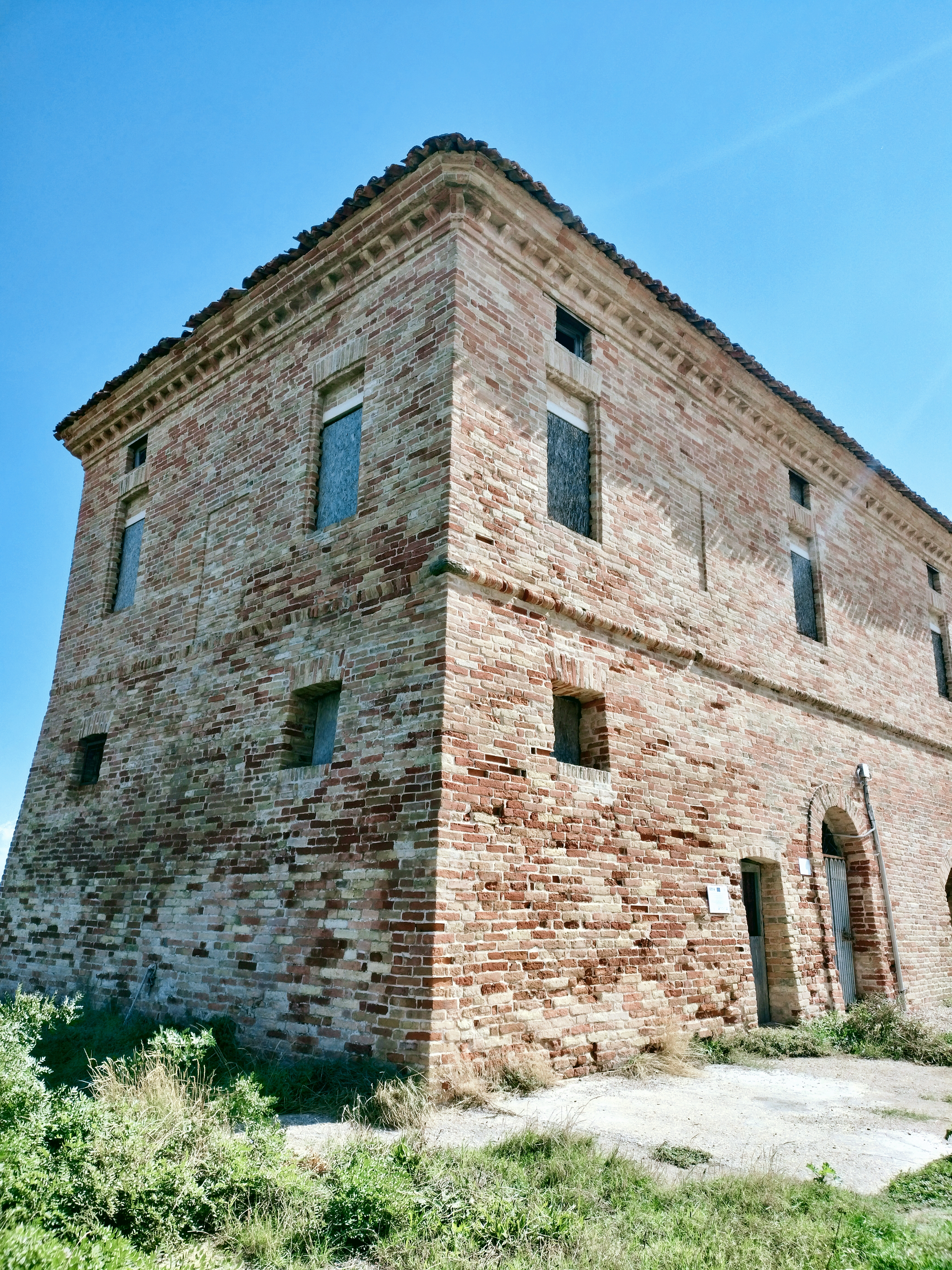
Tower on the port (Sentina Nature Reserve)

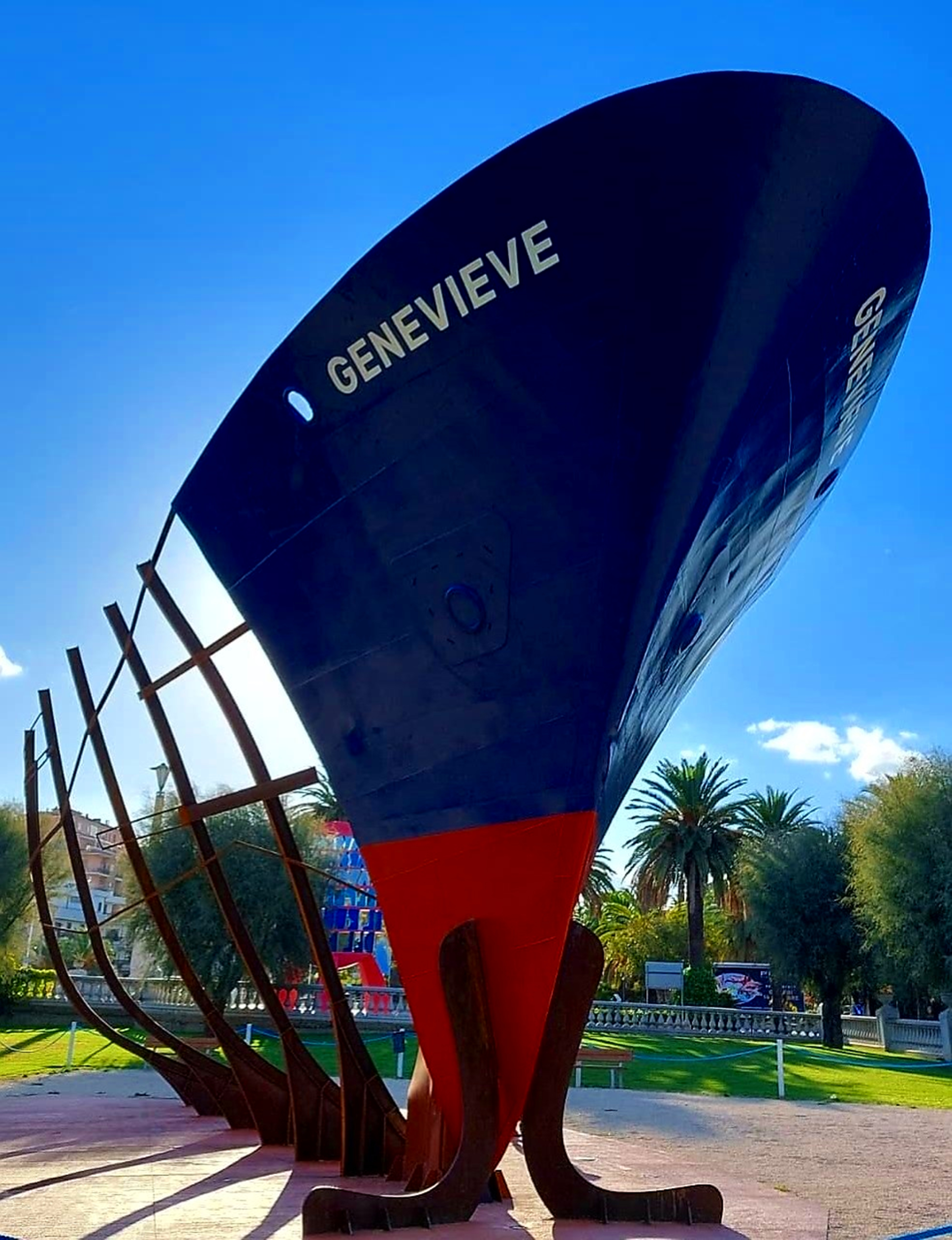
Genevieve monument dedicated to the oceanic navy of San Benedetto

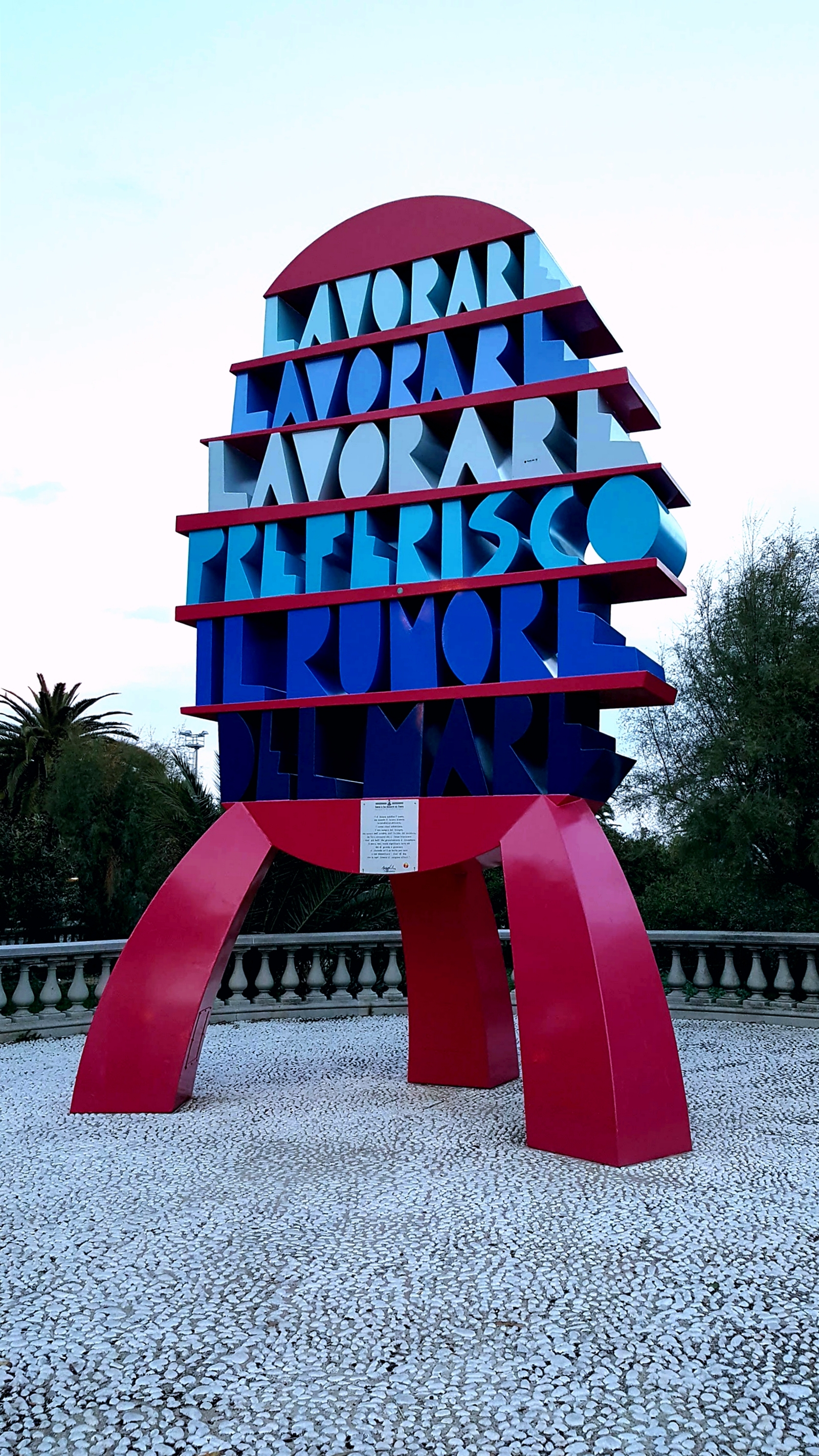
Monument by Ugo Nespolo: "Work, work, work, I prefer the sound of the sea"

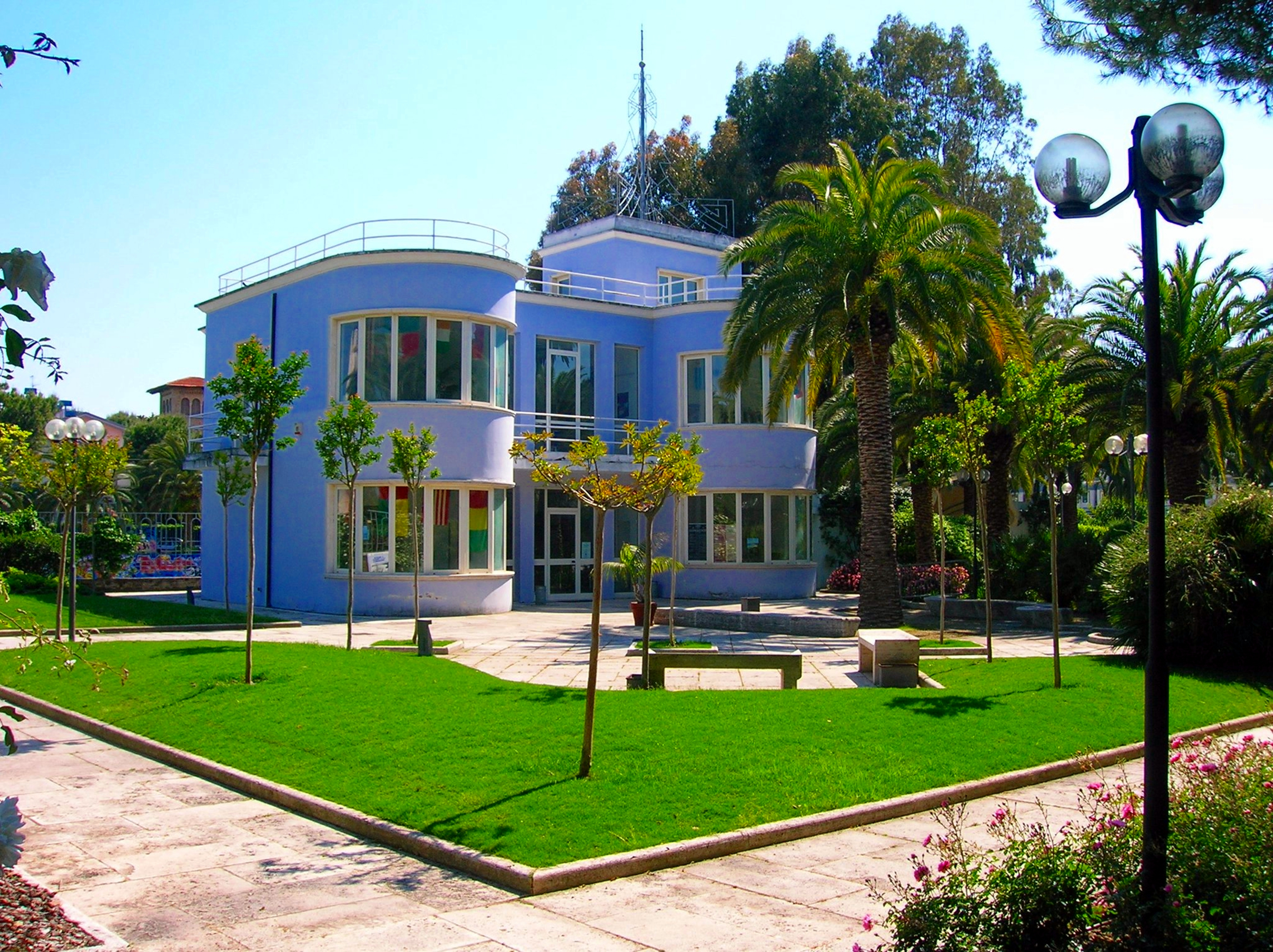
The Palazzina Azzurra

=== Paese Alto ===
indicates the oldest urban center of the city) Formerly the Castello district, it is a district of San Benedetto del Tronto, located on a modest hill with respect to the city center. It is a landmark of the city and the heart of the ancient historic center. The Paese Alto is home to what was the city's first residential nucleus. It houses the remains of a Villa Marittima from the Roman era of the 1st century BC, the Abbey Church of San Benedetto Martire dating back to the 11th century and the Torre dei Gualtieri. The paving of the streets and squares in the oldest part of the town is characterized by cobblestones and basaltic stone. Today the Upper Town is A tourist district with various accommodation facilities and refreshment points, very popular especially during the summer and Christmas periods and which attracts numerous visitors every year.

==== Madonna della Marina Cathedral ====
Built by municipal initiative during the 19th century in honor of the Madonna della Spiaggia, it was the first religious structure constructed outside the walls of the ancient village of Paese Alto. The building's consecration was celebrated with a solemn rite on 7 February, 1973, coinciding with its elevation to co-cathedral. From an institutional standpoint, on 30 September 1986, the church became the official cathedral of the Diocese of San Benedetto del Tronto-Ripatransone-Montalto. In 2001, the church was awarded the title of minor basilica.

==== Abbey Church of San Benedetto Martire ====
Ancient parish church, originally consisting of a small chapel above the tomb of Saint Benedict dating back to 313. It was enlarged between the 4th century and 12th century and completely rebuilt in the 18th century in late Neoclassical style. The building houses the tomb of Saint Benedict (4th century), the city's patron saint.

==== Church of San Giuseppe ====
Designed by the architect Ignazio Cantalamessa and built starting in 1870, the church was the main spiritual point of reference for the historic district of Mandracchio, the ancient nucleus of the lower marineria that developed around the characteristic Via Laberinto behind it.

==== Church of San Filippo Neri ====
Located in the populous neighborhood of the same name, it is a parish church built in 1961. The parish has a single domicile, extending its spiritual jurisdiction over approximately 4,800 residents in the municipality of San Benedetto del Tronto and approximately 3,500 in the Grottammare area.

==== Church of Saint Anthony of Padua ====
The cornerstone was laid on 10 December 1939, but the building was officially opened for worship and consecrated by Bishop Vincenzo Radicioni on 21 March 1953. Built in the mid-20th century as a modest subsidiary church, the structure offers a contemporary reinterpretation of the "hall" plan characteristic of medieval buildings of the mendicant orders. The main façade overlooks a churchyard preceded by a monumental travertine staircase leading to the wooden entrance portal. It is the church with the largest number of faithful in the city, with approximately 10,000 parishioners.

==== Gualtieri Tower ====
The Gualtieri Tower (Torrione) is an old observatory dating back to the 12th–13th century located on the highest and oldest part of the city known as San Benedetto Alta. The tower is 20 metres (66 ft) tall and provides a complete view of the city.

=== Monument to the fisherman ===
This statue is located at the point where the waterfront joins the southern dock of the harbor basin and reproduces the fishermen's estate during storms, when, to draw attention to the danger deriving from the looming fog over the sea, they used the trumpet. It is the work of Cleto Capponi, a Grottammarese artist.

=== The Jonathan seagull monument ===
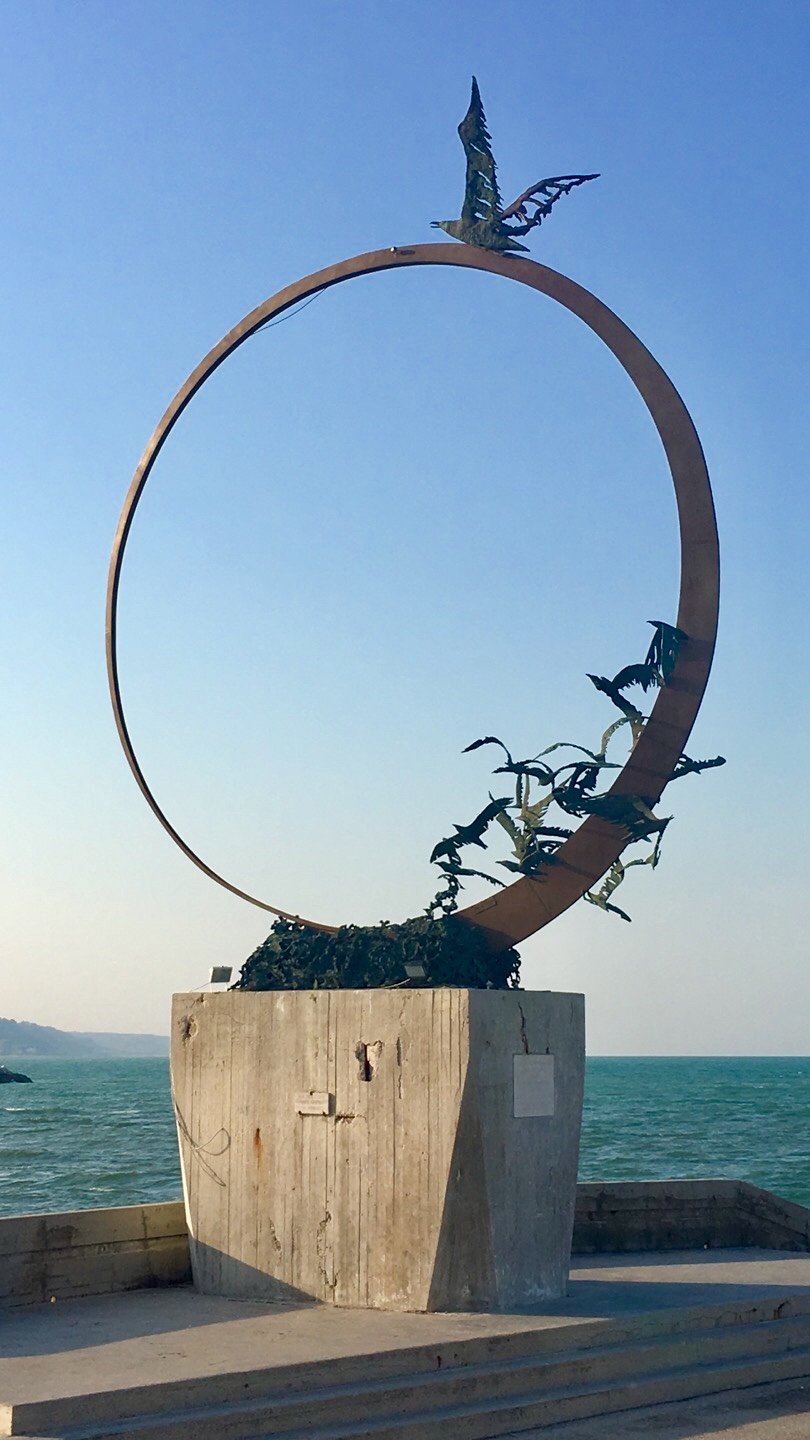
The Jonathan seagull monument

Created by the artist Mario Lupo in 1986, the monument to the seagull Jonathan Livingston Seagull, protagonist of the book by Richard Bach, rises along the southern pier promenade, the one that was renamed The Jonathan's way. The work, projected for 10 meters, encloses the life of seagulls and water in a blue circle. It is the symbol of the generous industriousness and tenacity typical of seafarers, people used to face and overcome obstacles and difficulties silently.

=== Museum of the Sea ===
The "Polo del Mare" museum complex is composed of five sections: the "Augusto Capriotti" Fish Museum, the Amphora Museum, the Marche Marine Civilization Museum, the Truentinum Antiquarium and the Sea Picture Gallery. The first four are located in the Wholesale Fish Market area. The Pinacoteca del Mare instead is located inside the Palazzo Piacentini.

==== "Augusto Capriotti" Fish Museum ====
It is among the most important museums in the Piceno area. Named after the distinguished Sambenedese scientist Augusto Capriotti, inaugurated in 1956 it now includes over 9,000 specimens divided into: fish, crustaceans, molluscs, cetacea, echinoderms, coelenterates and fossils. Also interesting is the library containing more than 1,000 volumes including rare texts of historical and scientific value.

==== Museum of Amphorae ====
Housed near the port, it represents a unique collection of amphoras of disparate ages (Canaanite, Phoenician, Punics, Greek, Roman and Byzantine) collected throughout the Mediterranean from the Sambenedetti fishing boats that they practiced bottom trawling, a technique that had not been permitted for years, which made it possible to recover these lost finds from past civilizations.

==== Museo d'Arte sul Mare (MAM) ====
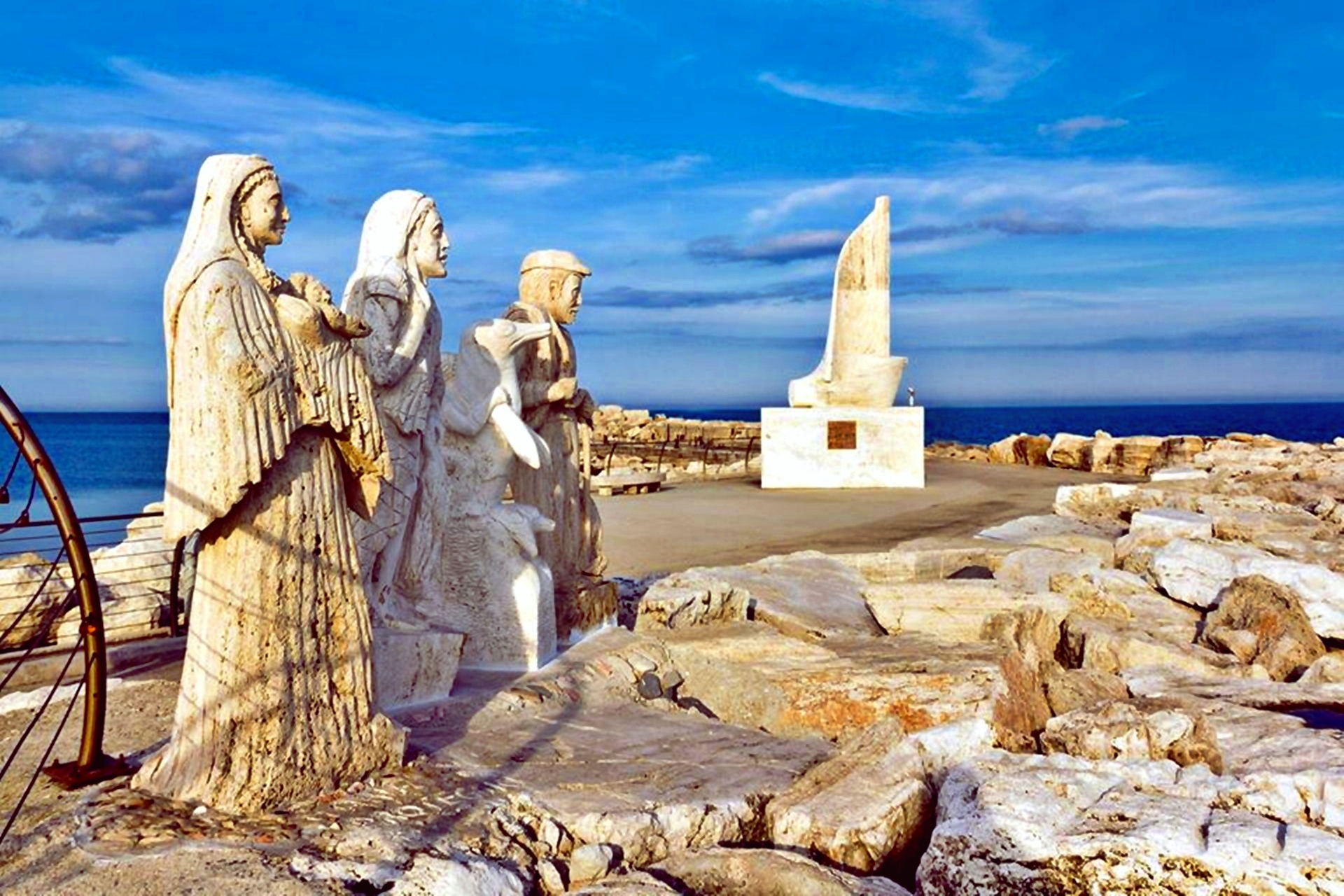
Travertine sculptural group

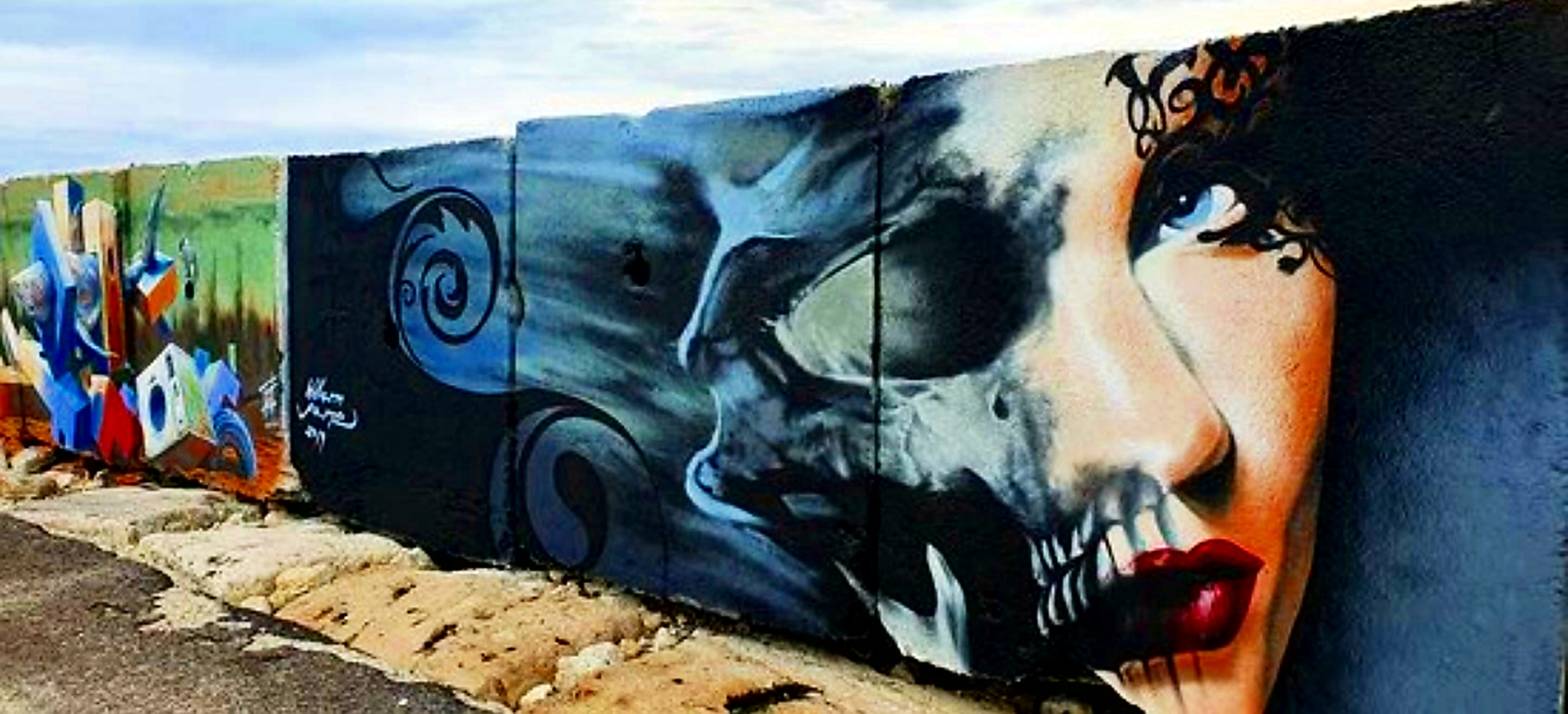
One of the many murals inside the museum

The Museo d'Arte sul Mare (MAM) is a permanent open-air museum that stretches over 1,150 meters along the 'Molo sud' (walkway) (called Jonathan's street ). It contains 195 artworks, of which 170 are sculptures made on the faces of the breakwater blocks of travertine lined up along the walk and 25 murals. The artworks have been created over the years by 164 sculptors and wall painters coming from 37 nations of five continents, guests of the International Art Symposium "Festival dell'Arte sul Mare".

=== The pedestrian street ===
The historic Viale Secondo Moretti, built at the beginning of the thirties of the last century by the engineer Luigi Onorati as part of the project that led to the construction of the waterfront, located in the city center, perpendicular to the beginning of the northern waterfront, has been for decades now, the meeting place of the Sambenedettese population and the surrounding area. Pedestrian area, recently renovated, home to the city's historic premises and numerous commercial activities, for some years now it has been enriched by a collection of works of modern art, in particular sculptures, by Ugo Nespolo, Enrico Baj, Mark Kostabi, Paolo Consorti, Marco Lodola, Paolo Annibali.

The center of the pedestrian street, a key meeting place of the town, is the Giorgini square (or Giorgini rotunda), dedicated to Carlo Giorgini, one of the most beloved mayors of the city, located at the intersection of the end of Viale Secondo Moretti and the north start of the waterfront. The fountain located in the center of the square has now become a symbol of the city.

=== The Palazzina Azzurra ===
The Palazzina Azzurra was inaugurated on 1 September 1934. In a purely rationalistic style, typical of the fascist era, it was built next to the two tennis courts and the Circolo Forestieri. The two-storey building, painted in blue, housed on the ground floor bars, lounges, showers and services for men and women. After a period of decline, the Municipality of San Benedetto brought the structure back to its citizenship in the most authentic sense, with spaces for the promotion and dissemination of art, with exhibition rooms, offices and services, all completed by a park.

=== San Benedetto Lighthouse ===
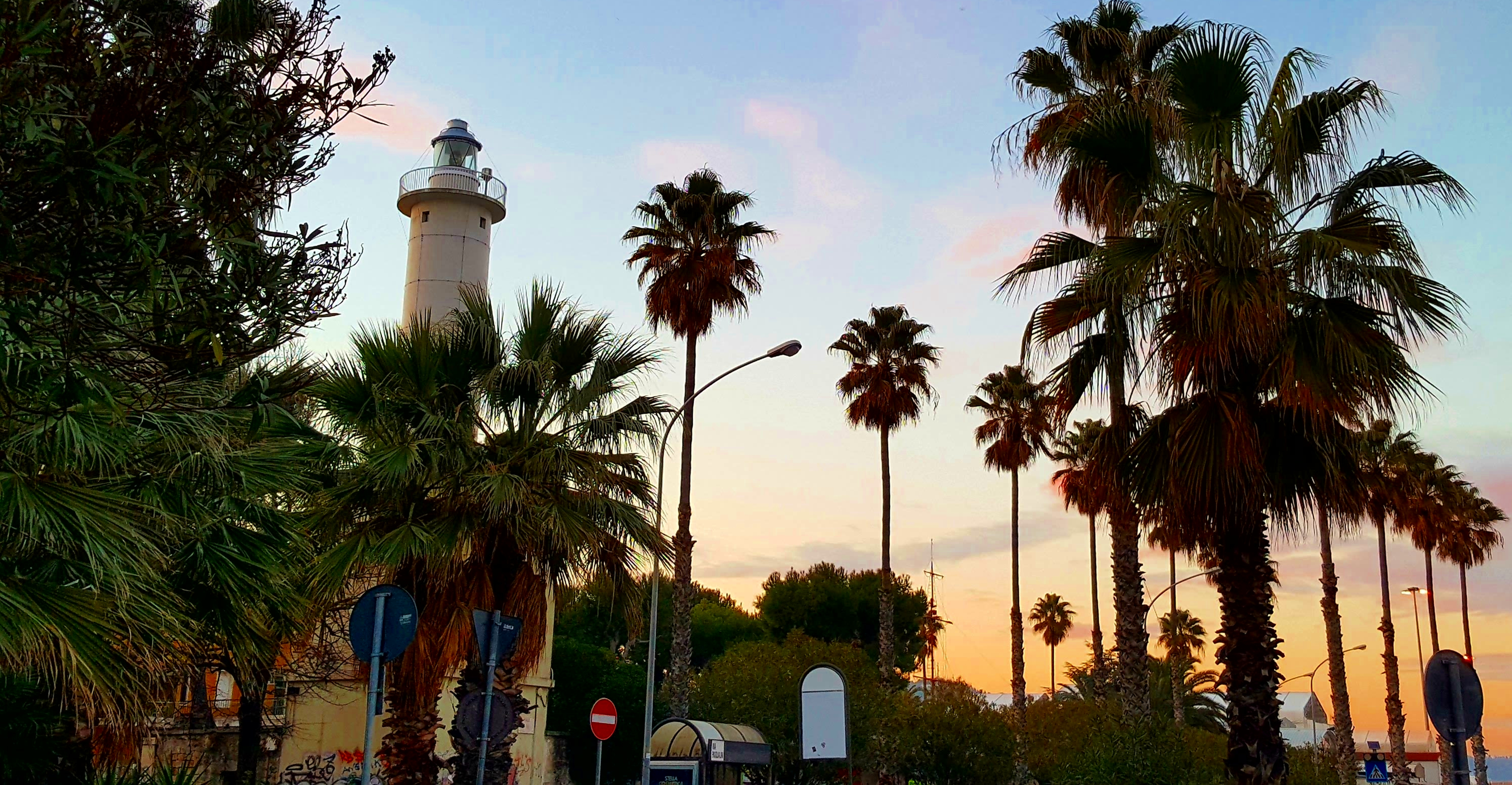
View of the San Benedetto lighthouse (on the right) from Viale Pasqualini

Located a few dozen meters from the port area, the San Benedetto Lighthouse officially entered into operation in 1957. The lighthouse is classified as a tall block, and consists of a base several meters high on which rests the 31-meter-high white cylindrical tower. It is completely controlled and managed by the Lighthouse Area Command of the Italian Navy based in Venice which is responsible for all the lighthouses in the middle and upper Adriatic Sea.

=== Waterfront ===
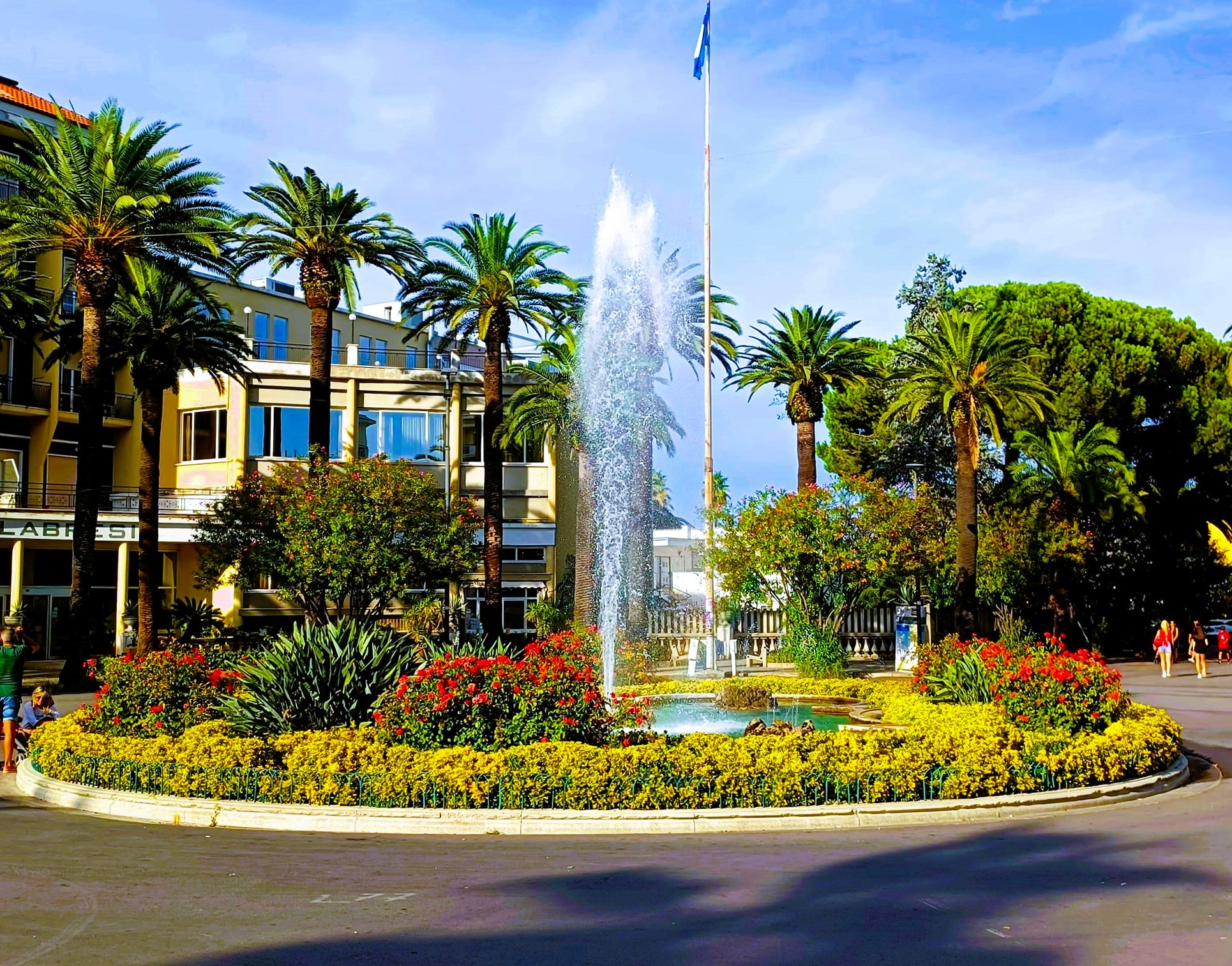
Carlo Giorgini square (the rotunda)

In 1931, on the project of the engineer Luigi Onorati, the promenade was built which, still today, as well as being an essential means of communication, is the center of San Benedetto. Considered disproportionate at the time of construction, it has a roadway with a total width of 30 meters and starts from the Giorgini roundabout (the rotunda), at the end of the central Viale Moretti, and, in its northernmost part, for the withdrawal of the sea consequent to the continuous enlargement of the port, it is very backward compared to the sea shore. Concludes at the Salvo D'Acquisto roundabout for a total length of about 5 km.

== Economy ==
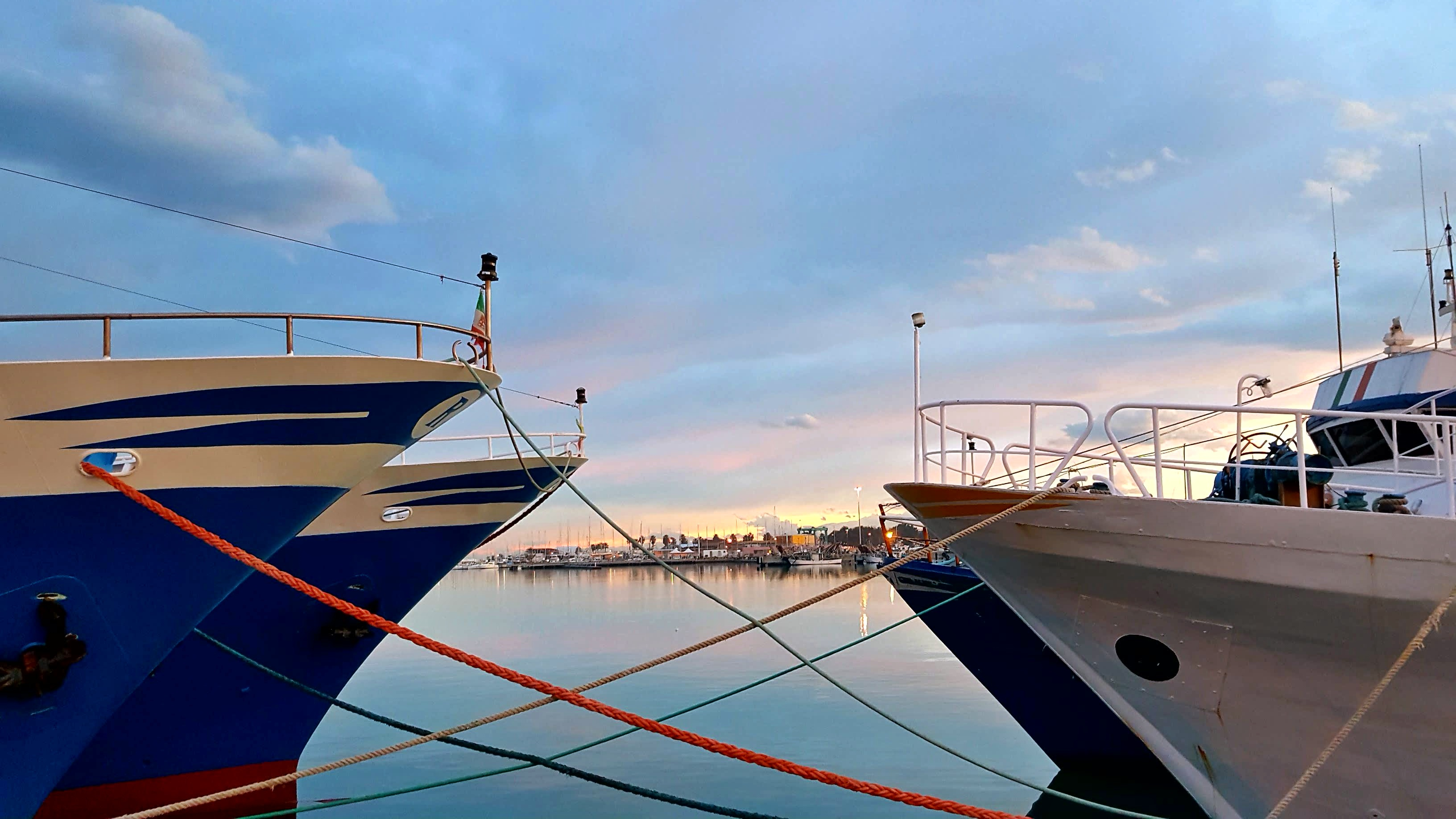
Fishing boats at the harbour of San Benedetto

=== Fishing ===
San Benedetto del Tronto has become, over the centuries, a fishing and tourist center of primary national importance. In 1912 the launch of a motorized fish-carrier began a process of transformation of the propulsion of the ships that, from the sail, reached the ocean fishing vessels. Alongside these events there have also been modernizations and developments also in other sectors directly linked to maritime activities, such as shipbuilding, hemp processing, cable and network construction, naval workshops, on-board instrumentation, fish marketing (San Benedetto boasts the most important wholesale fish market in Italy), the cold chains for the transport of fish.

=== Tourism ===
The tourism represents the most important item of the city income. San Benedetto has established itself, since the early decades of the twentieth century, as a popular seaside resort. Since the second half of the sixties, it has also established itself as the first tourist destination of Marche in terms of number of presences.

It boasts the Blue Flag of the European Community and invests in promoting and consolidating an image acquired not only nationally. This image has been conveyed, for about a decade, with the mark "Riviera delle Palme", a name which, sharing them under the same Tourism Promotion Company, also encompasses the other two countries bordering the southernmost part of Province of Ascoli Piceno, Grottammare and Cupra Marittima, as well as some villages in the San Benedetto area, Offida, Monteprandone, Acquaviva Picena, Ripatransone and the Lazio municipality of Accumoli (joined the consortium in 2008).

== Culture ==
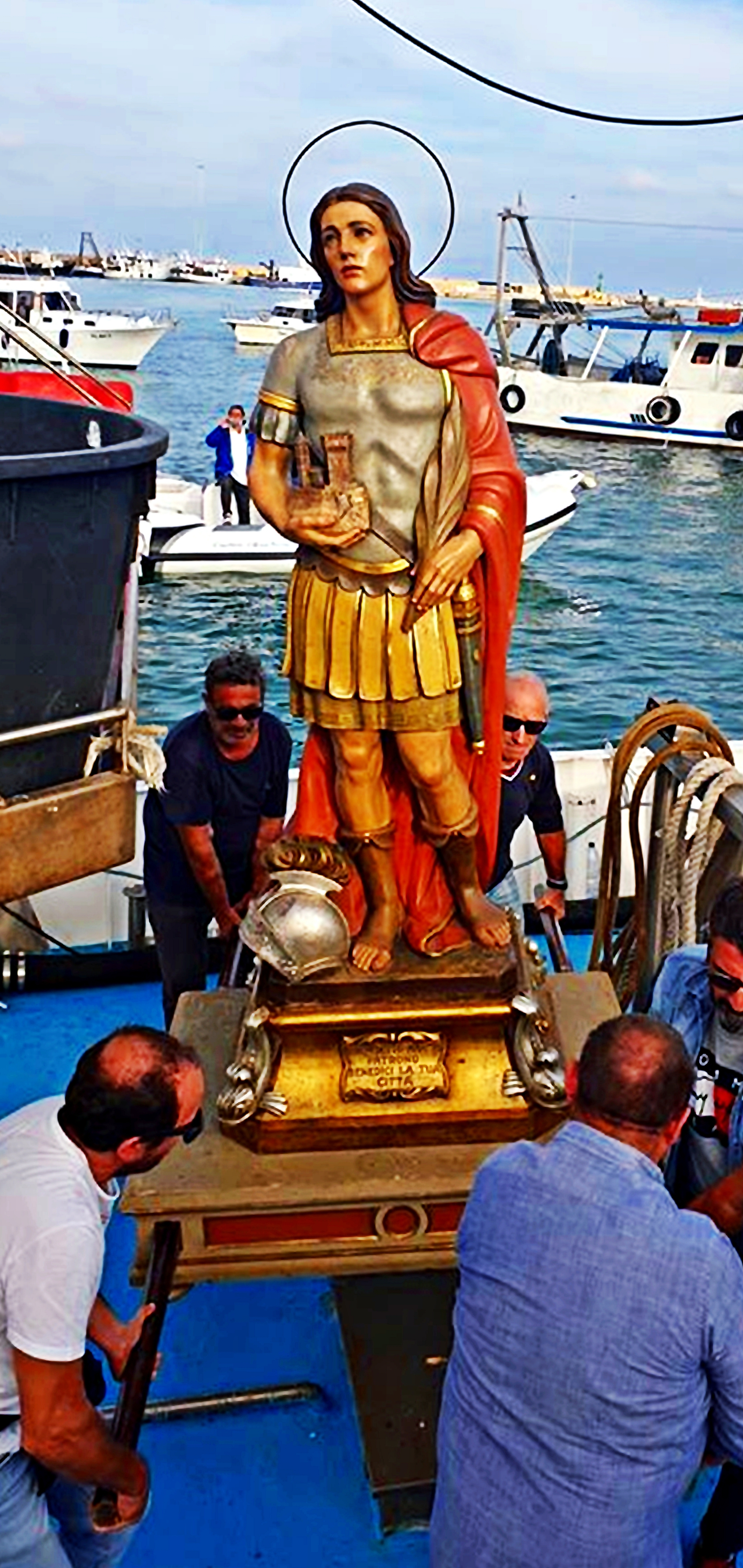
Historical reenactment of the martyrdom of Saint Benedict

=== Events ===
- Antiques and Palms, this is the antiques market show. It has been held several times of year since 1994.
- The Carnival of San Benedetto was established in 1828. In the early 19th century, advertising posters appeared announcing Carnival celebrations such as revels and dances in the city. In 1877, the "Circolo Unione" was founded, which annually organized a masked competition. The celebrations also included mortar fire, the ringing of the bell, and the town band.After repeated interruptions to the celebrations, in 1951, the first modern and institutionalized event took place. This truly revitalized the celebrations, with the first allegorical floats parading.
- Scultura viva takes place in June each year at the MAM (Museum of Art on the Sea), the international art symposium "Scultura viva" is one of the most important events in the city.
- San beach Comix is a summer festival of Comics, Cosplay and Games in the city of San Benedetto del Tronto.
- The Feast of the Madonna della Marina is considered the most important event of the summer of San Benedetto, as it unites the community and preserves maritime traditions. Celebrated annually on the last Sunday of July, its origins date back to the 16th centuries and 17th centuries.
- The feast of the patron saint, Saint Benedict the Martyr, is celebrated on 13 October and has been celebrated since 1679.
- Festival Primo Maggio Agraria – It is a music festival that has been organised annually since 1970 on the occasion of International Workers' Day.

=== Prizes ===
- The "Libero Bizzarri" award is a national documentary film competition held every July. It has been held annually since 1994.

== Gastronomy ==
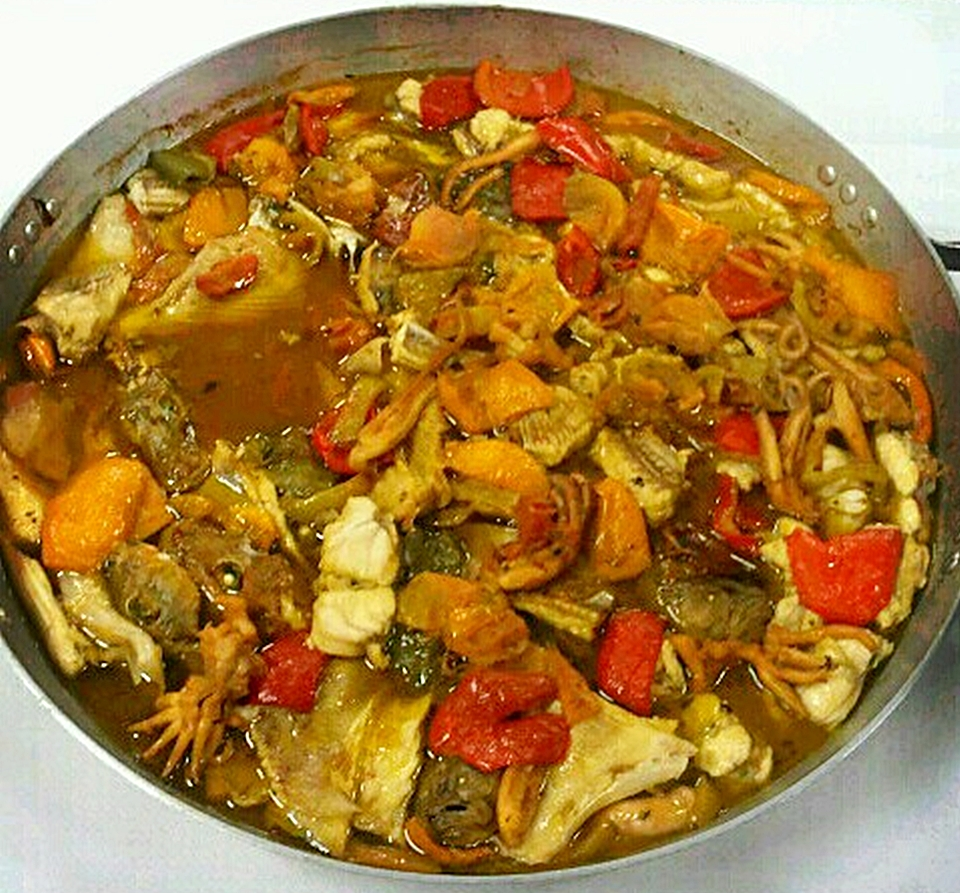
Fish soup "Brodetto alla sambenedettese"

=== Typical local cuisine ===
San Benedetto is in fact the home of "Brodetto alla sambenedettese", a Fish soup that differs from other recipes in the addition of Bell pepper and Vinegar. It is unique in its kind and has existed, according to the locals, "since the fishermen exist".

=== Drinks ===
As far as alcohol is concerned, the whole area of Province of Ascoli Piceno is known for the production of Rosso Piceno Superiore, Falerio, Rosso Piceno, Passerina, Vino cotto and Il Caffè del Marinaio , an ancient recipe of the fishermen of San Benedetto del Tronto.

== Demographics ==
Historical population
| Year | Pop. | ±% |
|---|---|---|
| 1487 | 200 | — |
| 1550 | 520 | +160.0% |
| 1615 | 800 | +53.8% |
| 1701 | 989 | +23.6% |
| 1701 | 1,057 | +6.9% |
| 1736 | 1,376 | +30.2% |
| 1782 | 2,329 | +69.3% |
| 1800 | 3,104 | +33.3% |
| 1835 | 4,365 | +40.6% |
| 1861 | 6,510 | +49.1% |
| 1871 | 7,077 | +8.7% |
| 1881 | 7,710 | +8.9% |
| 1901 | 10,124 | +31.3% |
| 1911 | 11,578 | +14.4% |
| 1921 | 14,402 | +24.4% |
| 1931 | 17,189 | +19.4% |
| 1936 | 17,461 | +1.6% |
| 1951 | 23,250 | +33.2% |
| 1961 | 31,274 | +34.5% |
| 1971 | 42,014 | +34.3% |
| 1981 | 44,773 | +6.6% |
| 1991 | 42,693 | −4.6% |
| 2001 | 45,054 | +5.5% |
| 2011 | 46,963 | +4.2% |
| 2021 | 47,000 | +0.1% |
Source: ISTAT

=== Population ===
Over the centuries, San Benedetto del Tronto evolved from a small fortified village to a major city. The population experienced significant growth between 1950 and 1970, with an increase of approximately 20,000 inhabitants. This growth was driven by the strong development of the local maritime industry and tourism. Over the years, the resident population has stabilized at 47,000, with modest growth, including 3,460 foreign residents. The municipal area is small and densely populated; San Benedetto is the municipality in the Marche region with the highest rates of construction and population density.

=== Emigration ===
In 1800, the post-Restoration crisis of the Papal Navy encouraged the emigration of ships and men to other parts of Italy and other centers in the Adriatic Sea. From 1820 onwards, until the second half of the 19th century, the migratory flow headed towards neighboring Abruzzo, to the communities of Giulianova, Silvi, Pescara, Ortona, and Vasto. In 1845, dozens of fishermen emigrated to the Lazio coast, settling in the cities of Nettuno, Anzio, and Civitavecchia. Towards the end of the 19th century, the migratory flow towards the areas of the Gulf of La Spezia and the upper Tyrrhenian Sea intensified, in particular towards the town of Bocca di Magra, a hamlet of the municipality of Ameglia. Other families settled in nearby Viareggio, where they brought their fishing boats, called Trabaccoli, to the Tuscan city. Today in the city of Viareggio the descendants of the Sambenedettesi are of the population, around 15,000 individuals. Since 1994 a heartfelt twinning has been in place between the two cities. From 1930, the migratory flow converged again both in neighboring Abruzzo, particularly towards San Vito Chietino and Vasto, and in Molise, in the city of Termoli. During this period, another migratory flow also concentrated in the city of Cesenatico and other towns on the Riviera Romagnola. From the late 19th century to the mid-20th century, many San Benedetto people, approximately 3,500, emigrated to the Americas: to North America to the city of Chicago Heights, from where many families then moved to California to the cities of Collinsville, San Francisco and San Diego, where San Benedetto sailors, with their ocean-going fishing boats, ventured to fish in other seas, even going as far as Alaska and Greenland to hunt cod; in South America instead towards Argentina, towards Buenos Aires and especially Mar del Plata, with which there is a heartfelt twinning. In 1943, the area adjacent to the port, train station, and railway—the upper part of the city—was subjected to heavy bombing by Allied forces; residents were forced to abandon their damaged homes and move to nearby towns. It is estimated that over 14,500 residents left the city, only to return after the end of hostilities. Many were forced to remain in the places to which they had been displaced and were unable to return to the city.

=== Religion ===
San Benedetto's population is mostly Roman Catholic. The city is the seat of the Diocese of San Benedetto del Tronto-Ripatransone-Montalto.

The first cathedral of the diocese was the former Cathedral of Santa Maria della Marina until 1847.

== Transport ==
San Benedetto del Tronto can be reached by various means:

=== Motorways ===
Motorway A14 (Bologna – Taranto), from the south exit San Benedetto – Ascoli Piceno, north side exit Grottammare. From Rome, take the A24 (Rome – L'Aquila) to the end, then follow to Giulianova until reaching the A14: From Florence you can exit at the Valdichiana exit of the A1 and then follow several highways, Perugia – Foligno, Muccia, Macerata – Civitanova Marche, San Benedetto del Tronto. The alternative from Florence is to exit the Orte tollbooth and follow the highways crossing Terni, Foligno, the Sibillini Mountains and Ancona.

=== Rail ===
The San Benedetto del Tronto train station is connected to lines that connect it to Milan – Bologna – Ancona – Lecce and also Rome – Falconara Marittima – Ancona.

=== Bus ===
There are several regional bus companies that connect San Benedetto del Tronto to the main cities of the center, including Rome (Rome Marche lines and Start).

=== Airport ===
The nearest airports are the Marche Airport (Raffaello Sanzio of Ancona – Falconara) and the one of Abruzzo Airport in Pescara.

=== Ship ===
The nearest port is in Ancona.

=== Cycle paths ===
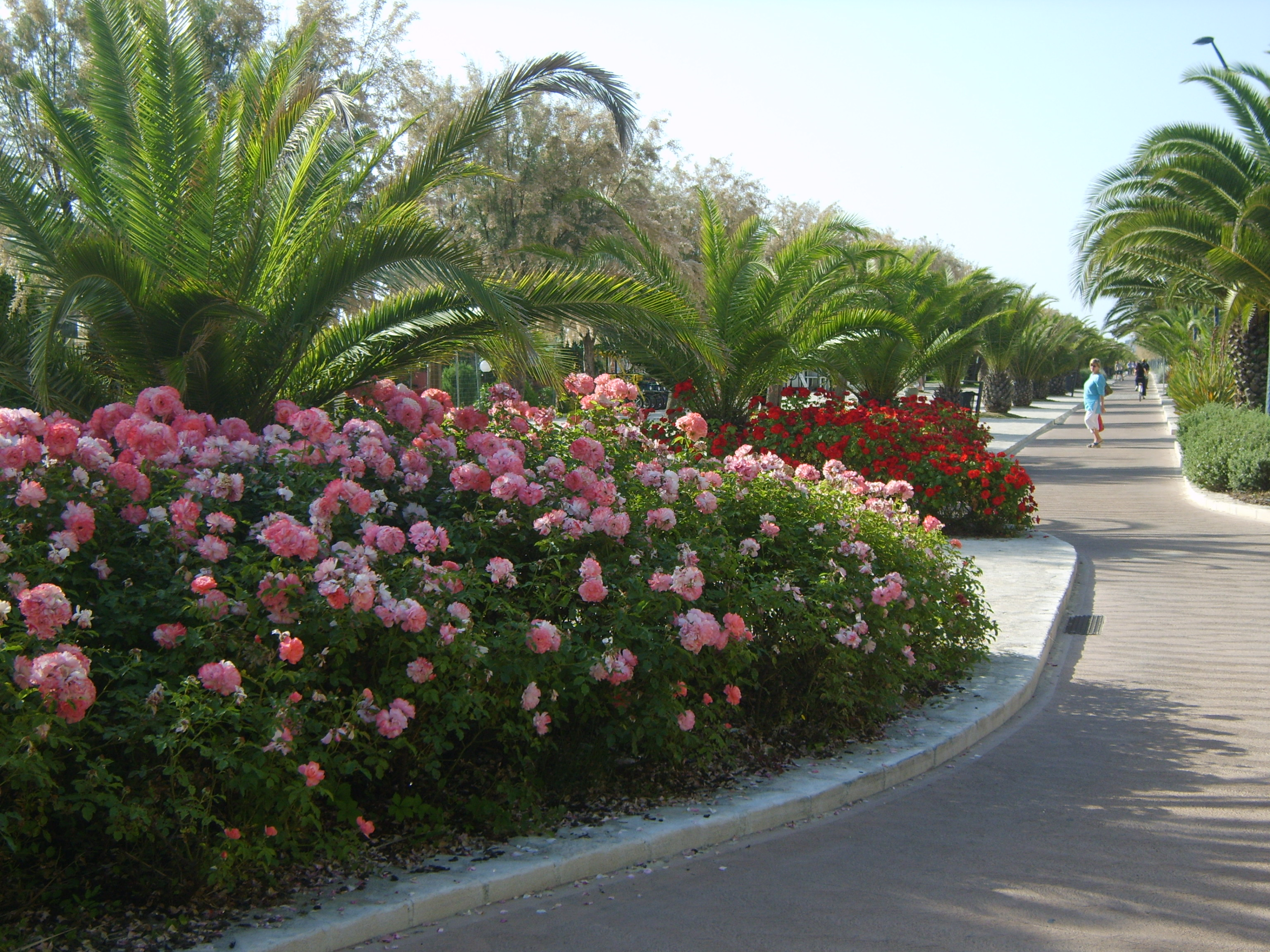
Section of the cycle path (south promenade).

The city has a large number of cycle paths, so much so that it is possible to follow it without interruption from the north (where it has a connection with the Grottammare cycle path) to the south (plunging into the Sentina Park). From 2001 to 2010, the section that completes a single walk up to Cupra Marittima was completed by extending the long Green Adriatic Corridor. In the coming years the construction of a bridge over the river Tronto is planned, which will make possible the connection between the cycle path inside the Sentina and the waterfront track of Martinsicuro (TE).

At the central railway station and the Sentina natural reserve there is a free Bicycle-sharing system, for tourists and residents, called C'entro in Bici . The San Benedetto del Tronto cycle path is part of the Green Adriatic Corridor, the bike path that runs along the Adriatic coast and crosses five regions from Emilia-Romagna to Apulia. From the Ciclovia Adriatica (near the Sentina regional nature reserve) the Ciclovia Salaria branches off, a cycling route that, once completed, will go to connect Adriatic coast with Rome and the coast tirrenica (to Ostia) closely following the route of the ancient Via Salaria.

== Sport ==
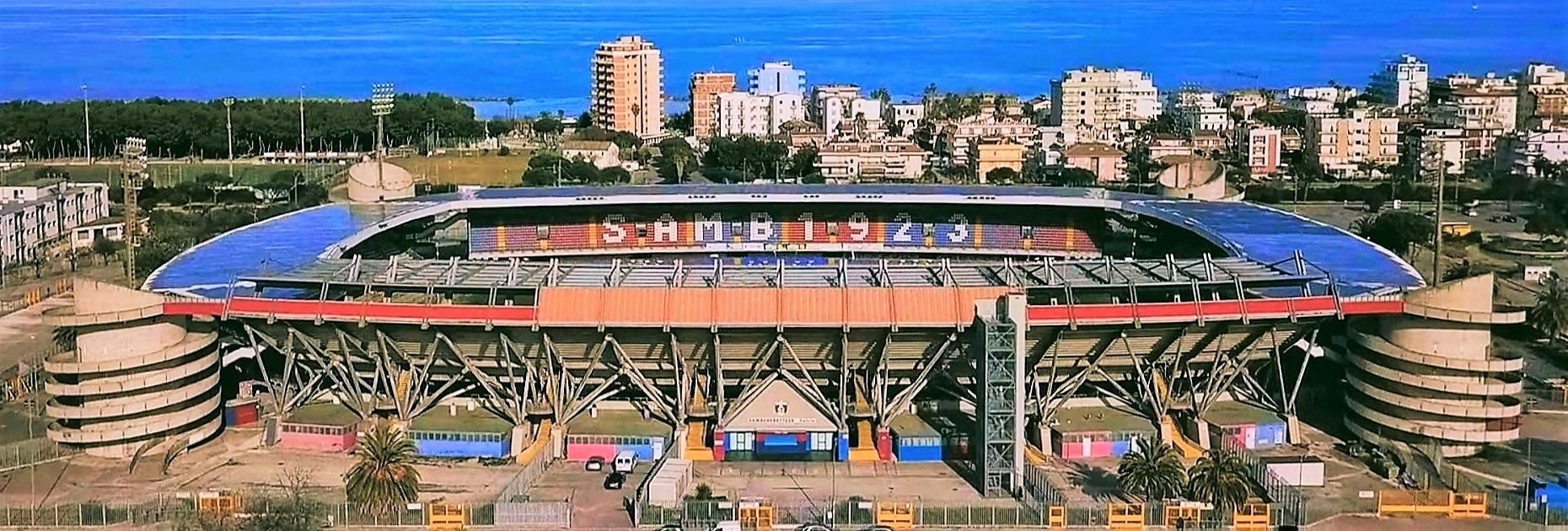
Stadio Riviera delle Palme

The Stadio Riviera delle Palme is a multi-use stadium in San Benedetto del Tronto. It is currently used mostly for football matches and is the home ground of S.S. Sambenedettese Calcio. The stadium has a capacity approximately of 15,000 people and is located in the "Brancadoro" area, Ragnola neighbourhood of San Benedetto del Tronto.

=== Football ===
San Benedetto del Tronto is home to the football team S.S. Sambenedettese Calcio. The team has played in Serie B and is currently playing in Serie C.

=== Beach Soccer ===
The Sambenedettese Beach Soccer company, runs the Serie A, of the Italian beach soccer championship. He won: the Scudetto in 2014 and 2017, the Italian Cup, in 2013 and 2017, the Super Cup in 2014, 2015 and 2017.

=== Cycling ===
In March, the city hosts the final stage finish of the Tirreno–Adriatico bicycle race.

=== Tennis ===
San Benedetto also hosts the San Benedetto Tennis Cup (a Challenger Tour tennis event) every July that attracts some of the world's best players.

=== Skating ===
In 2010 the municipality hosted the European Inline Speed Skating Championships; in 2011 the Italian championships.

== Notable people ==
- Lucia Albano (1965), is a member of the Chamber of Deputies and the Undersecretary of State for Economy and Finance.
- Stefano Travaglini, pianist and composer
- Marco Amabili is a researcher in mechanical engineering wo received significant international recognitions.
- Nando Angelini (1933–2020), was an Italian actor.
- Riccardo Bugari (1991), is an Italian speed skater. He competed in the 2018 Winter Olympics.
- Pierluigi Camiscioni (1953–2020), was an Italian rugby union player and stuntman.
- Giovanni Carminucci (1939–2007), was an Italian gymnast.
- Pasquale Carminucci (1937–2015), was an Italian gymnast. He was the brother of Giovanni Carminucci and participated in three editions of the Summer Olympics, 1960, 1964 and 1968.
- Enrica Cipolloni (1990), is an Italian female heptathlete, who won two national championships at individual senior level from 2014 to 2018.
- Paolo Consorti (1964), is an Italian artist and film director.
- Ugo Crescenzi (1930–2017), was an Italian politician and member of the Christian Democrats (DC).
- Giambattista Croci (1964), is a former Italian rugby union player. He played as a lock.
- Camillo De Lellis (1976), is an Italian mathematician who is active in the fields of calculus of variations, hyperbolic systems of conservation laws, geometric measure theory and fluid dynamics.
- Stefano Di Cola (1998), is an Italian swimmer. Is an athlete of the Gruppo Sportivo della Marina Militare.
- Enzo Eusebi (1960) is an Italian engineer, architect and designer.
- Massimo Fabbrizi (1977), is an Italian professional target shooter, is an athlete of the Centro Sportivo Carabinieri. He competed in the trap event at the 2012 Summer Olympics where he won the silver medal, an won 3 medals, 2 golds (2005,2011) and 1 silver (2009), you have ISSF World Shooting Championships.
- Fabiana Fares (1972), is an Italian modern pentathlete. She represented Italy at the 2000 Summer Olympics held in Sydney, Australia.
- Giorgio Fede (1961), politician serving as a member of the Chamber of Deputies
- Carlo Fidanza (1976), is an Italian politician who has served as a Member of the European Parliament.
- Daniele Giorgini (1984), is an Italian professional tennis player.
- Mudimbi (1986), is an Italian singer and rapper.
- Laura Di Matteo, (1991) is an Italian former professional wrestler
- Andrea Pazienza (1956–1988), was an Italian comics artist and painter.
- Andrea Rossi (1986), is an Italian footballer who plays as a defender.
- Daphne Scoccia (1995), is an Italian actress.
- Linda Valori (1976), is an Italian singer.
- Sebastiano Vecchiola (1970), is a retired Italian football midfielder.

== International relations ==
=== Twin towns – sister cities ===
San Benedetto del Tronto is twinned with:

- Alfortville, France
- Chicago Heights, United States
- Mar del Plata, Argentina
- Šibenik, Croatia
- Steyr, Austria
- Trinidad, Cuba
- Viareggio, Italy

== See also ==
- Upper Town of San Benedetto del Tronto
- Porto d'Ascoli
- Riviera delle Palme (Marche)
- Roman Catholic Diocese of San Benedetto del Tronto-Ripatransone-Montalto
