= Marsol (chestnut) =

Chestnut cultivar

Marsol (aka Marisol) is a natural chestnut hybrid, a cross between a European chestnut (Castanea sativa) and Japanese (Castanea crenata) (CA 07).

The French National Institute for Agricultural Research (INRA) produced this variety from Lalevade-d'Ardèche. It is mainly used as a rootstock because of its good graft compatibility with many varieties. As a rootstock, it is more vigorous than Maraval (equal to Bouche de Betizac or Comballe).

Marsol root stock compatibility
Compatible to scions from	Incompatible to scions from
Bouche de Betizac	Marigoule
Bournette	Marron de Goujounac
Precoce Migoule	Verdale Delsol
Belle epine	
Bouche rouge	
Comballe	
Insidina	
Impériale	
Dorée de Lyon	
Fertil	
Maraval	
Marron d'Olargues	

Trees are resistant to rust and roots have some resistance to ink disease. Marsol is the most sensitive chestnut cultivary to Dryocosmus kuriphilus - the chestnut gall wasp, and very sensitive to the codling moth, fairly sensitive to root asphyxiation, resistant to mosaic virus, slightly susceptible to chestnut blight.

Trees are of medium height with a long trunk and branches higher up. Early bud breaks makes the shoot development sensitive to spring frosts. The male catkins flower from June 19–30 June followed by female flowers June 27 - July 8. The male catkins are pollen sterile.

Nut production of grafted trees is medium with higher production on seedling trees. Nut production starts at four to five years. The triangular nuts are mid season ripening - shiny red mahogany in color. They keep and peel well. The nuts can be used fresh or for processing. The nut taste is described as lower quality. Occurrence of double embryos (pericarp splitting) is less than 5%.

Vegetative multiplication is quite easy.
