= Marone (disambiguation) =

Marone is a town and comune in the province of Brescia, in Lombardy, Italy.

Marone may also refer to:

- Marone (surname), an Italian surname
- Marone family, a family in the CBS Daytime soap opera The Bold and the Beautiful
  - Jackie Marone, a fictional character in the CBS soap opera The Bold and the Beautiful

== See also ==
- Marone Cinzano
- Maron (disambiguation)
- Maronea (disambiguation)
- Maroney (disambiguation)
- Marrone
- San Marone (disambiguation)
