= Marigoule (chestnut) =

Hybrid chestnut

Marigoule (a contraction of Marron of Migoule) is the name of a French hybrid of chestnut (synonym M.15 or CA 15), cross between a European chestnut (Castanea sativa) and Japanese (Castanea crenata). In 1986, it originated from a Migoule orchard in Ussac in Corrèze. It is planted in sunny, low altitude areas protected from the wind (up to 300 m elevation for South-West orchard orientation or up to 400 m elevation in South-East orchard orientation). In France, it is grown mainly South of the Dordogne and Lot-et-Garonne for the fresh market production because of the nuts appearance.

== Culture ==
As rootstock, it is graft incompatible with many varieties but compatible with Precoce Migoule, Maridonne, Bournette, Fertil, Sauvage Marron, Precoce Monteil and Sucquette.

Marigoule has medium quality pollen. This cultivar can be a pollinator for most of the pollen sterile chestnut trees such as Colossal, Bouche de Betizac, and Marrone. Marigoule female flowers may have difficulty getting pollinated if the weather is rainy at the end of spring. It therefore requires the presence of pollinizers (1 row out of 3 planted with Precoce Migoule). Under dry climate and with good pollinators, it is moderately productive. Chestnuts mature medium-early in fall. The nuts fall in the burr. Nuts are large of bright red brown color that keep well. Once cured for a few days, nuts can be as sweet as candy and peel well. No pericarp splitting (double embryos) reported.

It takes 4–5 years for trees to start bear fruit, which should be considered when planting an orchard. Tree growth is vigorous but very demanding on the quality of the soil, which must be rich in organic matter.

Its fast growth and the quality of its wood make it interesting for reforestation. It is the hybrid that best resists phytophthora. It is also resistant to canker but is sensitive to cold weather and root asphyxia.
