= Maraval (chestnut) =

Hybrid chestnut

Maraval is a named natural chestnut hybrid (synonym CA 74), a cross between a European chestnut (Castanea sativa) and a Japanese chestnut (Castanea crenata). INRA bred this variety in 1986 in France Lalevade-d'Ardèche. Maraval produces a big mahogany colored nut from triangular to elliptical triangular shape. The nut keeps well. Nut peeling is mediocre but good in boiling water. Nuts can be used fresh as well as for processing.

Maraval are not very demanding to the quality of the soil and produce nuts in 4 to 5 years. Maraval grow at 250-300 m of altitude in the warm regions of France such as Gironde, Dordogne, Pyrenees-Atlantiques, Midi-Pyrenees. The tree is considered partially pollinating since its pollen is not very fertile.

Its early budding makes it sensitive to spring frosts. It is resistant to leaf rust and ink disease. The tree is a mid-season hybrid variety, upright with moderate vigor and medium stature. The medium stature allows denser orchards than other hybrids such as Marigoule.

Maraval is mainly used as root stock because of its good graft compatibility with many chestnut varieties. As a rootstock, it is graft compatible with the varieties: Bouche de Betizac, Bournette, Precoce Migoule, and Maridonne. Maraval root stock is graft incompatible with Marigoule and Primato.
