= Bouche de Betizac (chestnut) =

French chestnut cultivar

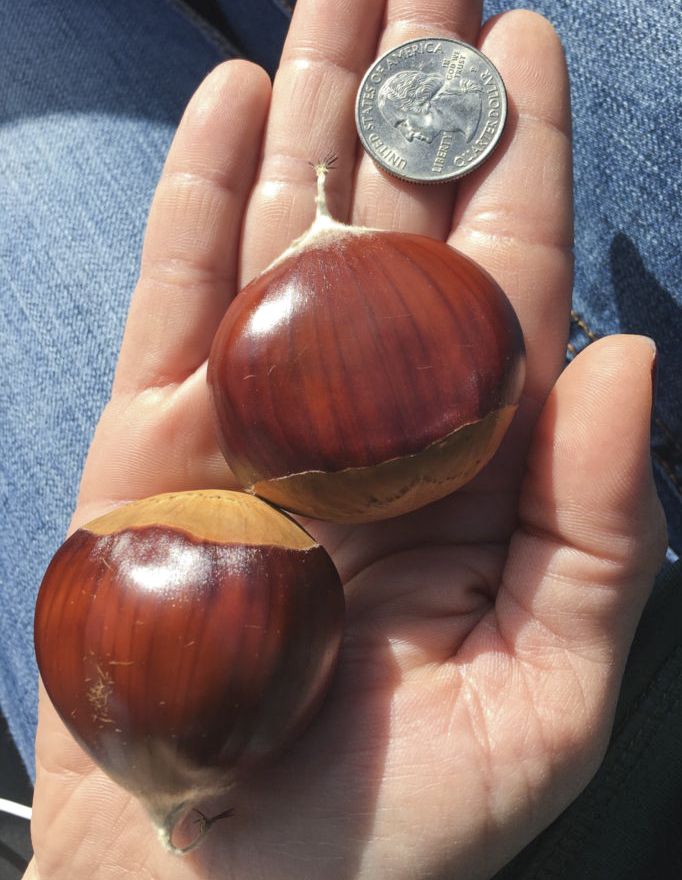
Bouche de Betizac

Bouche de Bétizac is a French chestnut cultivar developed in 1962 by INRA at the station of Malemort-sur-Corrèze near Brive. It is a controlled hybrid between Castanea sativa and Castanea crenata (female Bouche rouge × male Castanea crenata CA04). This variety produces large to very large chestnuts. It has very good flavor for a hybrid. With Marigoule, it is the variety currently most cultivated in the French chestnut groves because it is very productive (3 tons per hectare on average). Its fruit is bright, light chestnut-brown quickly turning brown and dark brown.

== Culture ==
The upright tree of moderate height can be planted tightly in chestnut groves (7 m x 7 m), with 200 productive trees per hectare. In addition, its productivity matures quickly. In drip irrigated culture, in Bordeaux, the cumulative production at the age of 5 to 7 years can be between 21 and 40 kg per tree.

"Bouche de Bétizac" is pollen sterile and is pollinated by many varieties such as Belle Epine (chestnut), Marron de Goujounac (chestnut), Marron de Chevanceaux (chestnut) and to a lesser degree Bournette (chestnut), Precoce Migoule, Maraval and Marsol. This cultivar is not very susceptible to chestnut blight and chestnut gall wasp. However, as an early budding variety it is sensitive to spring frosts. Bouche de Bétizac keeps its leaves into early autumn. The nuts are also hanging on the tree for a long time and vibrators are sometimes used to aid the harvest. In the southwest of France, it is found up to 400 m elevation.
