= Marone (surname) =

Marone is an Italian surname. Notable people with the surname include:

- Lou Marone, an American professional baseball player
- Pietro Marone, an Italian painter of the late-Renaissance periods
- Sergio Marone, a Brazilian actor

== See also ==
- Marone (disambiguation)
- Marone Cinzano
