= Marone Cinzano =

Marone Cinzano is an Italian surname. Notable people with the surname include:

- Enrico Marone Cinzano, an Italian artist and furniture designer
- Francesco Marone Cinzano, an Italian businessman
- Noemi Marone Cinzano, an Italian businessperson

== See also ==
- Cinzano (disambiguation)
