= Maronea =

Maronea may refer to:

- Maronea (lichen), a genus of lichen in the family Fuscideaceae
- Maroneia, a municipality in the Rhodope regional unit, Greece
- Maroneia (Attica) a place in the south of the Attica peninsula, Greece.
