= Precoce Migoule =

Chestnut cultivar

The Precoce Migoule is a chestnut hybrid (CA 48), a natural cross between a European chestnut (Castanea sativa) and a Japanese chestnut (Castanea crenata). It was discovered by J. Dufrenoy at the orchard of Migoule in Brive-la-Gaillarde. The tree is vigorous and erect growing with growth of a metre (3 ft) or more in a season if the conditions are right. It is a large sized chestnut tree with height reaching 20 m (60 ft) or more and 7.5-10 m (25-35 ft) wide. Trees start to bear after 3 to 5 years. Full nut production in 12 - 20 years depending on the location.

This hybrid can be grown in many areas where grapes are grown. It is cold hardy to -28C (-20F) . In an orchard with South West orientation it can be grown up to 500 m (1640 ft) elevation. It is an early ripening variety - great for northern climates where late ripening varieties can get damaged by frost - a very dependable producer in cool regions .

It blooms early and is frost sensitive but can produce nuts from secondary buds. The pollen has low to medium fertility. In the Northern hemisphere, the bloom period for the male catkins is June 15-30, female flowers June 25 - July 10. It can pollinize all Castanea sativa cultivars and can get pollinated by Basalta #3, Belle Epine, Bournette, Ginyose, Marigoule, Marsol, Tsukuba, and Vignols .

Precoce Migoule is sensitive to codling, susceptible to bark canker, resistant to rust. Phytophthora resistance is poor on its own root stock. It is better to graft Precoce Migoule onto ink disease resistant rootstock of Marsol, Maraval or Marigoule.

Trees drop nuts free of the burr. Nut fall is usually mid to late September and continuing until the first week into October. Depending on the root graft, the nuts can be large (24-26 per pound, 15-18 gram/nut). Precoce Migoule is a variety of chestnuts with more than 12% double embryos, which is still commercially acceptable because of its large nuts. The color of the nuts is light mahogany. The nuts are as sensitive to kernel rot as Marron du Var and Marsol and exhibit higher sensitivity to kernel rot than Bouche de Betizac, Mardonne, Maraval and Marigoule.

Nuts peel well, store well, and can be roasted for consumption. Nut production is mostly for the fresh market.
