= Cinzano (disambiguation) =

Cinzano is an Italian brand of vermouth.

Cinzano may also refer to:

- Cinzano, Piedmont, a town in Italy
- Cinzano Milano, an LBA Italian professional basketball team, based in Milan, Italy
- Cinzano Crystal Palace, a basketball team competing in the National Basketball League and then the British Basketball League

== See also ==
- Marone Cinzano
