= San Marone =

San Marone may refer to:

- San Marone, a 4th-century Syrian Syriac Christian hermit monk
- San Marone, Civitanova Marche, a Roman Catholic church located in the Italian comune of Civitanova Marche
- San Marone, Rome, a church in Rome
- San Marone Martire, Monteleone di Fermo, a Roman Catholic parish church in Monteleone di Fermo

== See also ==
- Marone (disambiguation)
