= Comballe =

Variety of chestnut

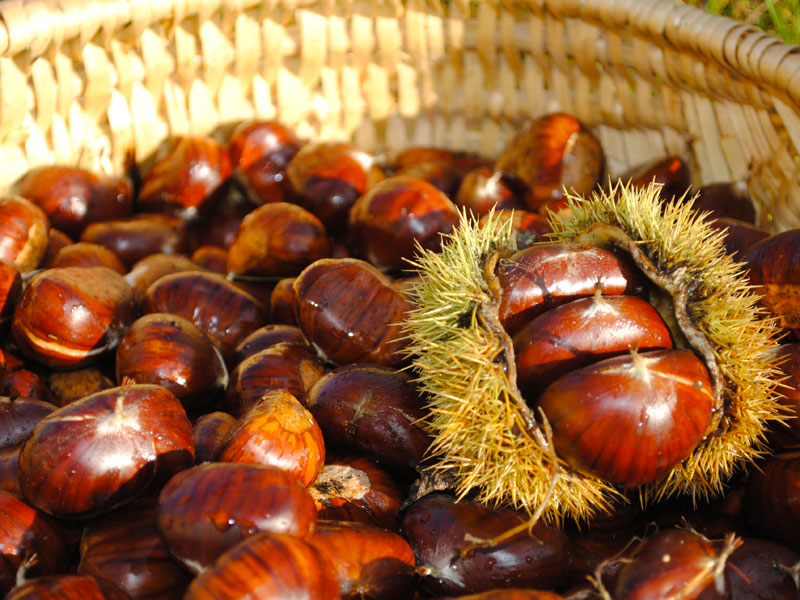

Comballe is a French traditional chestnut (Castanea sativa) variety. In France, it is the variety with the largest production. This beautiful rustic nut of Ardèche origin has a bright, streaky chestnut colour. Its fine, sweet and fragrant flesh justifies the excellent taste reputation.

The Comballe takes its name from the Combeaux, farmhouse of the canton of Saint-Pierreville, in the mountains of the Ardèche and Vivarais. It originated in the beginning of the eighteenth century and spread through the region. Its very bright chestnut color features honey reflections with very characteristic dark and regular streaks. Its shape is elliptical elongated. Its tuft is long and fine and its attachment scar (hilum) is large, clear and rectangular.

The Comballe is a characteristic variety produced in the Ardèche, the largest chestnut production region in France. It is so appreciated that it makes up one third of the total production in this region. The tree is particularly suitable for its original region, the Boutieres and the Ardèche centre. It thrives at 400 m to 650 m elevation in the Cevennes in Ardèche but also in Lozère. Given its superior qualities it has supplanted many local varieties.

The flesh of the nut - white, fine, sweet and fragrant - is recognized as one of the best. These taste qualities make the nut good for all uses and preparations including chestnut cream. The Comballe nut peels easily but can have multiple embryos. The late developing pericarp, makes the nut vulnerable to codling and rot in hot and humid autumns. The preservation of the nuts is complicated. Because of its fragile bark, the tree is particularly exposed to chestnut blight.

Comballe trees produce high nut yields of sizable caliber: between 30 and 70 nuts per kilogram. A clone of the Comballe named "Marron Comballe" (CA106) has the advantage of having a nut a little more rarely compartmentalized.
