= Francesco Marone Cinzano =

Italian businessman (born 1959)

- Born: 21 March 1959 (age 67)
- Occupation: Businessman
- Spouse: Marcella Pittaluga
- Children: 3
- Relatives: Noemi Marone Cinzano (sister)

Count Francesco Marone Cinzano (born 1959) is an Italian businessman. A wine personality, he is known for owning Col d'Orcia, Erasmo, and formerly the Cinzano Glass.
