= Noemi Marone Cinzano =

Italian businessperson

Countess Noemi Marone Cinzano
- Born: 1957 (age 68–69)
- Occupation: Businessperson
- Spouse: Hans Vinding-Diers
- Children: 2
- Relatives: Francesco Marone Cinzano (brother)

Countess Noemi Marone Cinzano (born 1957) is an Italian businessperson. A wine personality, she is known for owning many well established vineyards and Cinzano Glass. Her flagship wine is considered to be Noemía de Patagonia.

== Biography ==
Cinzano is the daughter of the late Alberto Marone Cinzano, and the elder sister of Francesco Marone Cinzano, who owns Col d’Orcia. She has two children. Cinzano arrived in Brazil at the age of 17.

She has assisted the organization of numerous wine exhibitions throughout the world.

== Vineyards and wineries ==
Cinzano took over her father's vermouth business after his death in 1990, and in 1992 she bought the Tenuta di Argiano, a 16th-century 120 acre (50ha) vineyard, in a 100 hectares (250 acres) estate; produced 337,000 bottles of wine which included 109,000 Brunello di Montalcino wine. Exporting to the United States, United Kingdom, Brazil, Denmark and Japan, Tenuta di Argiano is one of the top ten largest producers, by volume, of Brunello di Montalcino and Rosso di Montalcino wine. Solengo was produced in the vineyards of her much respected Brunello estate which is set around her villa, the Tuscan Tenuta di Argiano (built in the 1570s) built in Renaissance architectural style.

During Cinzano's ownership, Tenuta di Argiano was one of the Brunello di Montalcino estates that was investigated during the Brunellopoli scandal for suspicion of adulterating the wines with other grape varieties which, under Denominazione di Origine Controllata e Garantita (DOCG) regulations are supposed to be made from 100% Sangiovese. In 2008, the suspected vintages were impounded by government officials and eventually Tenuta di Argiano declassified the wines, selling them as "Super Tuscans" under the Indicazione Geografica Tipica (IGT) designation instead of as Brunello di Montalcinos. In February 2013 Cinzano sold the Tenuta di Argiano estate to an undisclosed "group of international investors" for reportedly near 50 million euros. Production of the estate is said to be around 120,000 bottles.

Together with her partner and winemaking consultant, Hans Vinding-Diers, she co-founded the Noemía de Patagonia in 2002, in Argentina. This Bodega Noemìa de Patagonia's project had been established in 1998 by subsuming an old vine Malbec vineyard in the Rio Negro Valley that was planted in the 1930s and 1950s. The vines are ungrafted and planted on their rootstock in the Patagonian Desert which has little risk of developing phylloxera. All of Bodega Noemìa de Patagonia's vineyard properties are farmed biodynamically. Noemía is considered to be her flagship wine and has been included in the book 1001 Wines: You Must Try Before You Die 2011.

== See also ==
- List of wine personalities
