= Colossal (chestnut) =

Chestnut cultivar

The chestnut cultivar Colossal originates from the USA - California Central Valley. It is a Castanea sativa × Castanea crenata hybrid that is cold hardy to −20 °F (−29 °C). The tree can be grown in Zones 4-8, blooms early, and is pollen sterile. Colossal is chestnut blight, root rot and kernel rot susceptible. It was introduced commercially in 1925 and is a major producer of large nuts for American commercial growers.

== History ==
It is probable that ‘Colossal’ was a seedling of one of Felix Gillet’s high quality French (Castanea sativa) cultivars, pollinized by a Japanese (Castanea crenata) tree. The original Colossal tree and its pollinizer were planted in approximately 1888-1890 by Benjamin Tonella in Nevada City, California The most likely source for the trees was The Barren Hill Nursery of Felix Gillet. Gillet imported some of the best French chestnut cultivars and also imported an assortment of Japanese chestnuts. Gillet died in 1908 and the nursery was bought by C. E. Parsons. Parsons introduced the Colossal chestnut commercially in 1925. In 2000, the original ‘Colossal’ tree was over 70 ft (21 m) tall, with a spread of over 50 ft (15 m) and a trunk circumference approaching 14 ft (4.3 m).

== Culture ==
Colossal tree growth is vigorous but the wood is somewhat weak. Reportedly, heavily loaded spreading branches can break under high burr load or in strong wind For almost all American commercial chestnut growers the Colossal chestnut tree is the producer of the largest nuts and the most nuts. Colossal orchards require interspersed planting of pollenizers.

Results from wind-pollination and hand-pollination experiments in Michigan strongly suggest that the highest Colossal nut production is achieved when pollen is available at anthesis. Anthesis in mid-Michigan is generally between late-June and early-July.

Grafted trees may start producing at a young age within the first few years of transplanting. Nuts usually fall early and free of the burrs. Nuts can be large 11-15 per pound (~25g/nut). Usually there are 3 nuts per burr. Colossal nuts have occurrence of double or triple embryos per nut. The pellicle (skin) of the nuts is thick. Fresh refrigerated nuts should be consumed within 90 days because Colossal nuts do not store well.

The taste of Colossal nuts is average with high sucrose content. There are other cultivars, where chestnuts rank higher in taste tests.

In the California central valley, under ideal conditions, Colossal orchards can produce 4,500 lb (2,000 kg) of nuts per acre. Due to early bud break, late spring frosts can cause damage on early leaves and buds.

== Sources ==
- Anagnostakis, Sandra L. The Connecticut Agricultural Experiment Station CULTIVARS OF CHESTNUT, 2013, accessed 2017
- Vossen, Paul, Chestnut culture in California Publication 810, 2000, accessed 2018
