= Maroneia (Attica) =

Maroneia (Ancient Greek: Μαρώνεια) was a settlement in ancient Attica, located near the Mines of Laurium. Its site is unlocated.
