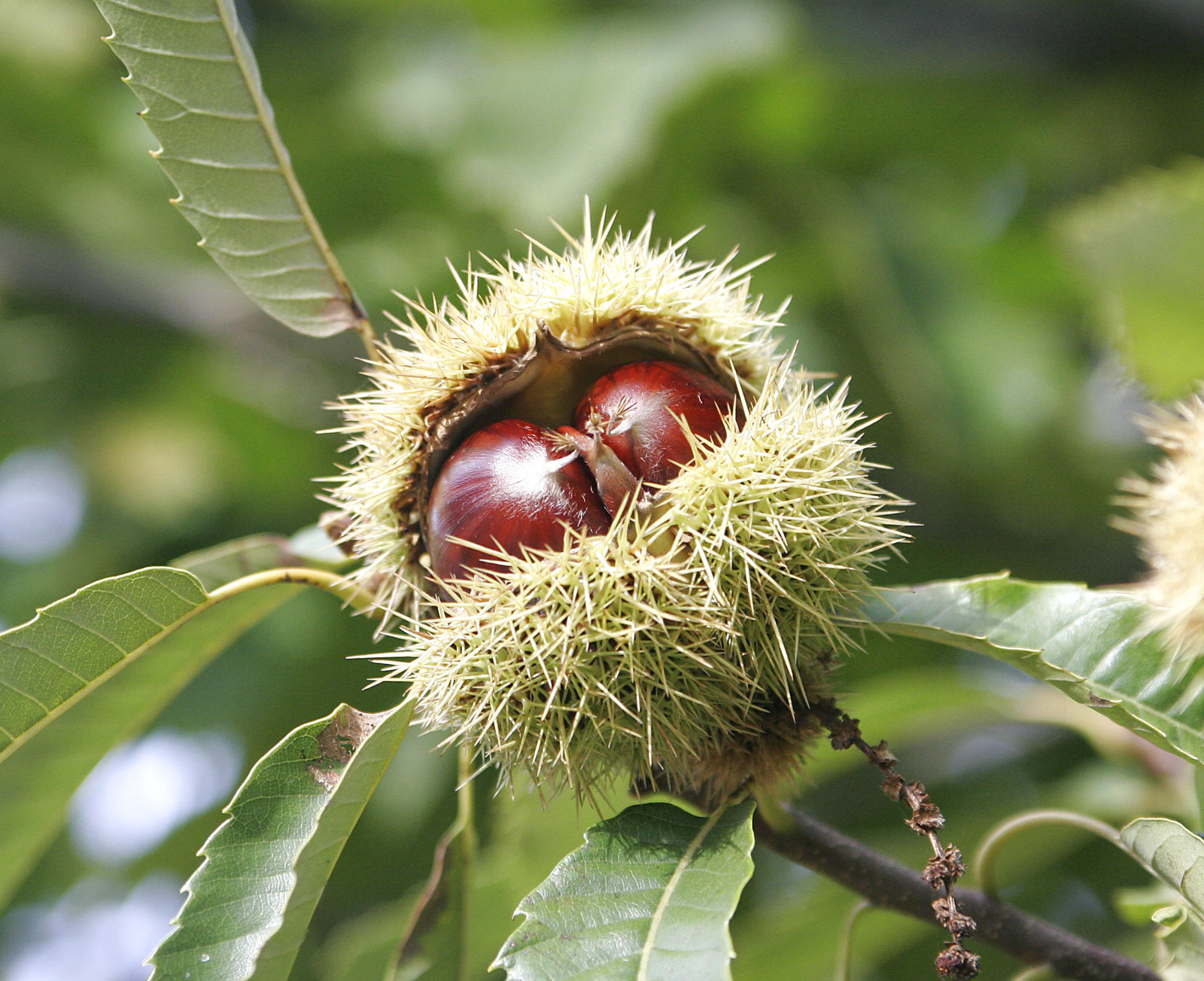
- Fruit

Conservation status
- Least Concern (IUCN 3.1)

Scientific classification
- Kingdom: Plantae
- Clade: Tracheophytes
- Clade: Angiosperms
- Clade: Eudicots
- Clade: Rosids
- Order: Fagales
- Family: Fagaceae
- Genus: Castanea
- Species: C. sativa

Binomial name
- Castanea sativa Mill.
- Probable native range ✖ Isolated population Introduced and naturalised (synanthropic) area ✖ Isolated population

= Sweet chestnut =

Species of tree

The sweet chestnut (Castanea sativa), also known as the Spanish chestnut or European chestnut, is a species of tree in the flowering plant family Fagaceae.

Growing up to 35 m (115 ft) tall and with trunks over 4 m (13 ft) wide, the tree has long toothed leaves. Its long catkins contain both male and female flowers, the latter producing brownish nuts with spiky sheaths in the fall. The tree can live for hundreds of years.

Serrated leaves of Sweet chestnut, with fruit still attached to the stems

The species is native to Southern Europe and Anatolia, and widely cultivated in Western and Central Europe. It provides food for animals but is affected by fungal pathogens. The starch-containing seed, the chestnut, is edible to humans and has been used in cooking since ancient times.

== Description ==
Castanea sativa is a deciduous tree attaining a height of 20–35 metres (66–115 feet) with a trunk often 2 m (7 ft) in diameter. Around 20 trees are recorded with diameters over 4 m (13 ft) including one 7.5 m (25 ft) in diameter at breast height. A famous ancient tree known as the Hundred Horse Chestnut in Sicily was historically recorded at 18 m (59 ft) in diameter (although it has split into multiple trunks above ground). The bark often has a net-shaped (retiform) pattern with deep furrows or fissures running spirally in both directions up the trunk. The trunk is mostly straight with branching starting at low heights. The oblong-lanceolate, boldly toothed leaves are 15–32 centimetres (6–13 inches) long and 5–10 cm (2–4 in) broad.

Castanea sativa is monoecious, with individual trees having both male and female flowers. The flowers of both sexes are borne in upright catkins 10–20 cm (4–8 in) in length, with the male flowers in the upper part and female flowers in the lower part. In the Northern Hemisphere, they appear in late June to July, and by autumn, the female flowers develop into spiny cupules containing 3–7 brownish nuts that are shed during October. The female flowers eventually form a spiky sheath that deters predators from the seed. Trees must be around 25 years in age before they start bearing fruit. The sweet chestnut is naturally self incompatible, meaning that the plant cannot pollinate itself, making cross-pollination necessary. Some cultivars only produce one large seed per cupule, while others produce up to three seeds. The nut itself is composed of two skins: an external, shiny brown part, and an internal skin adhering to the fruit. Inside, there is an edible, creamy-white part developed from the cotyledons.

Sweet chestnut trees live to an age of 500 to 600 years. In cultivation they may even grow as old as 1,000 years or more.

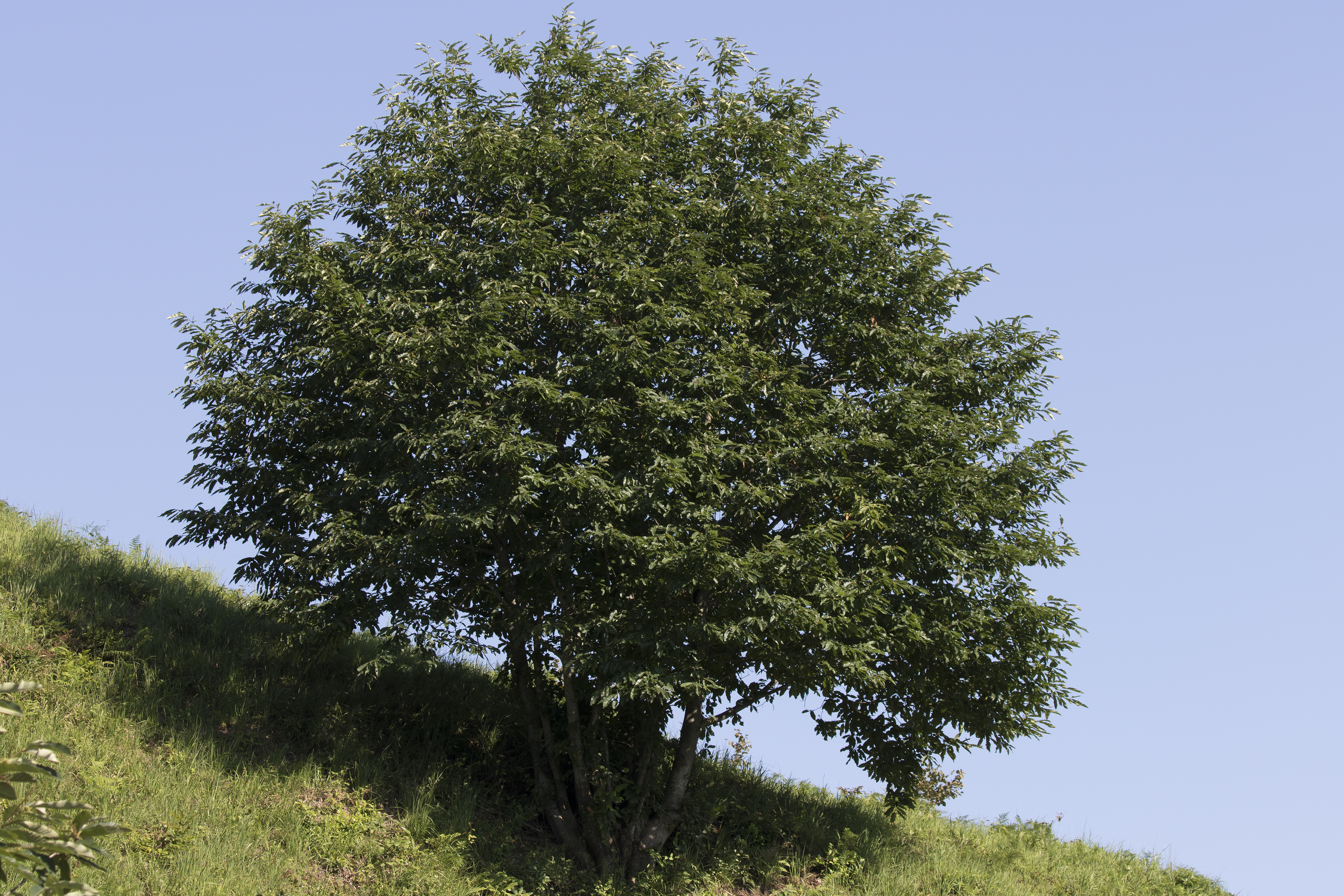
Habit

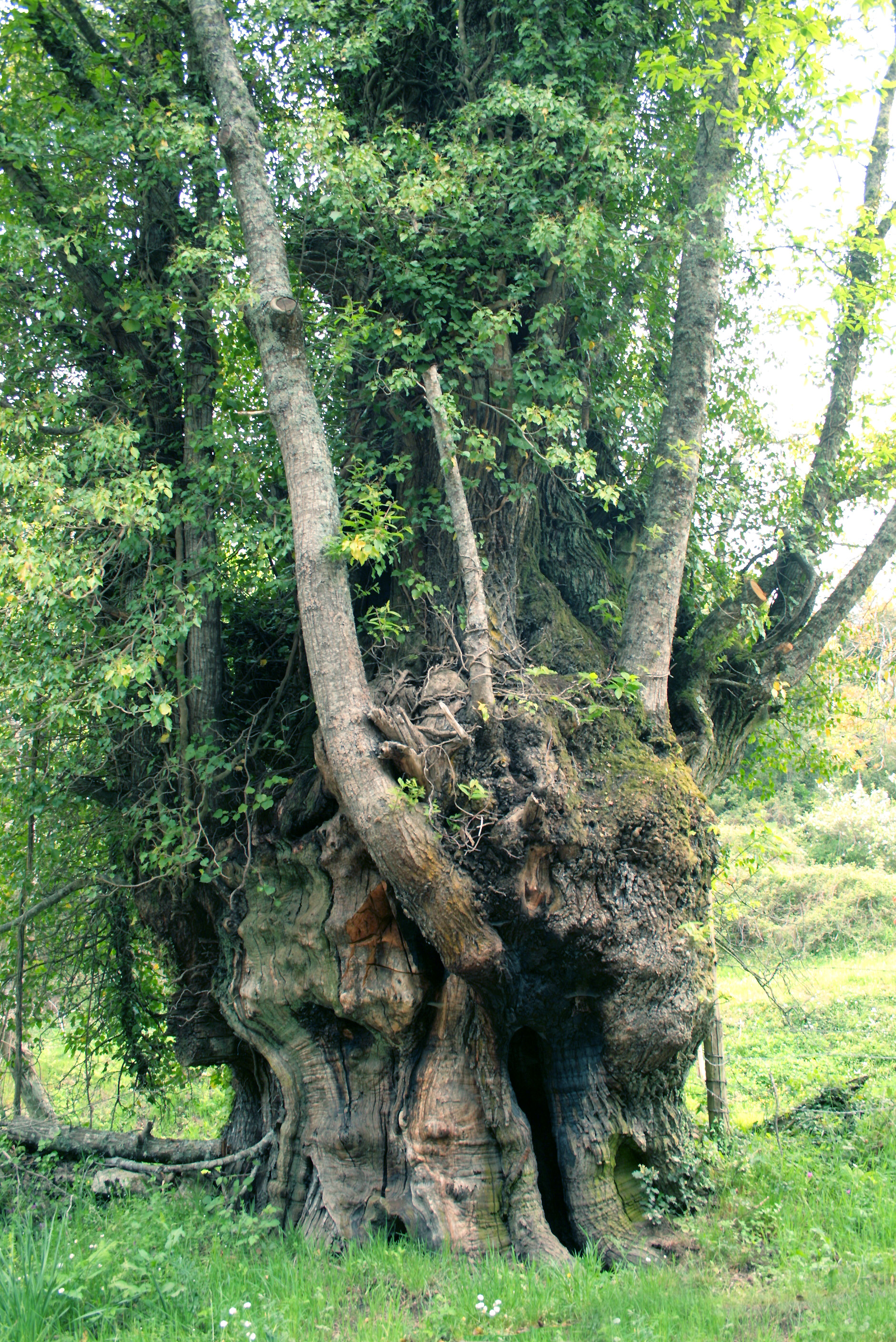
Ancient tree, Corsica

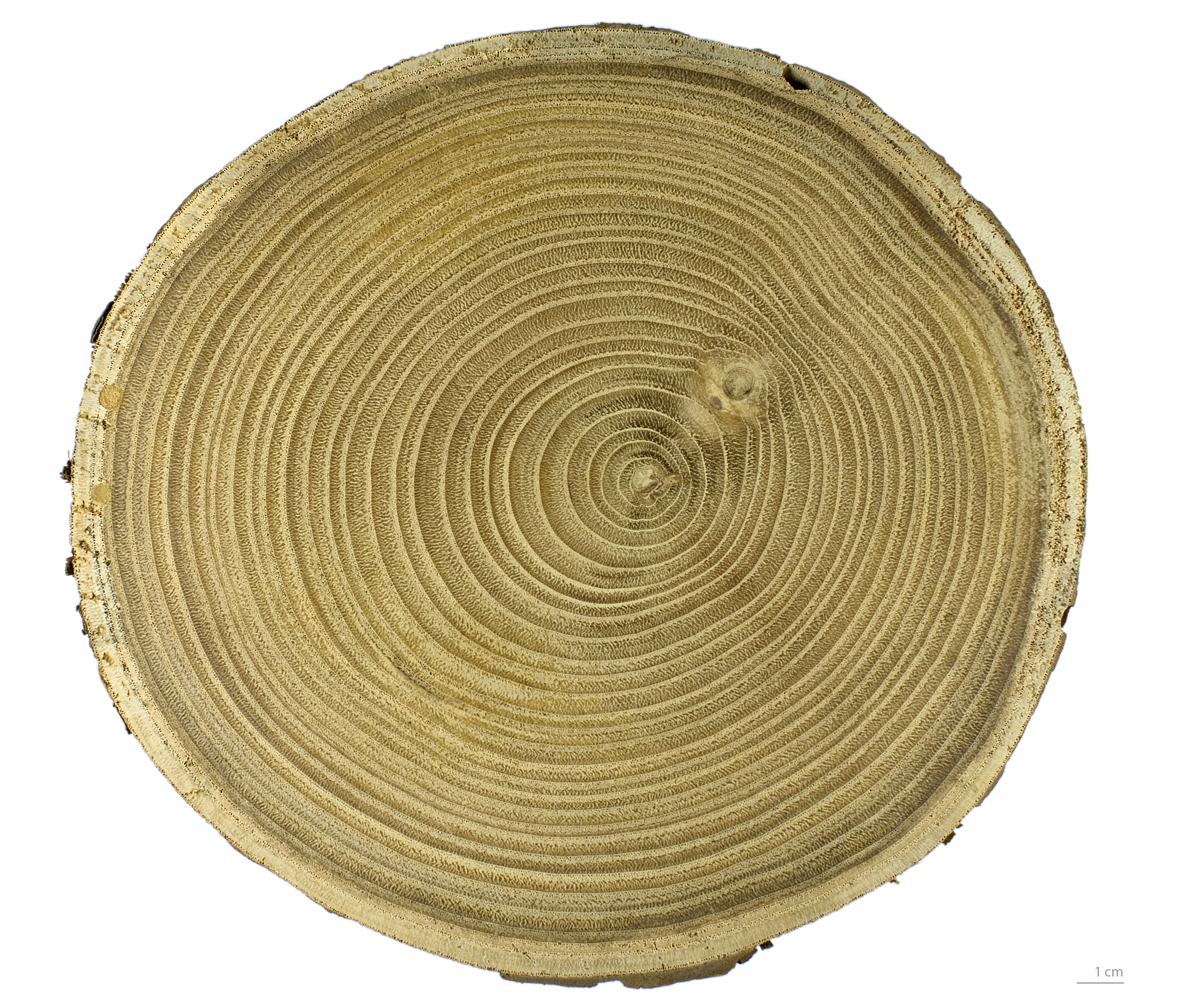
Growth rings

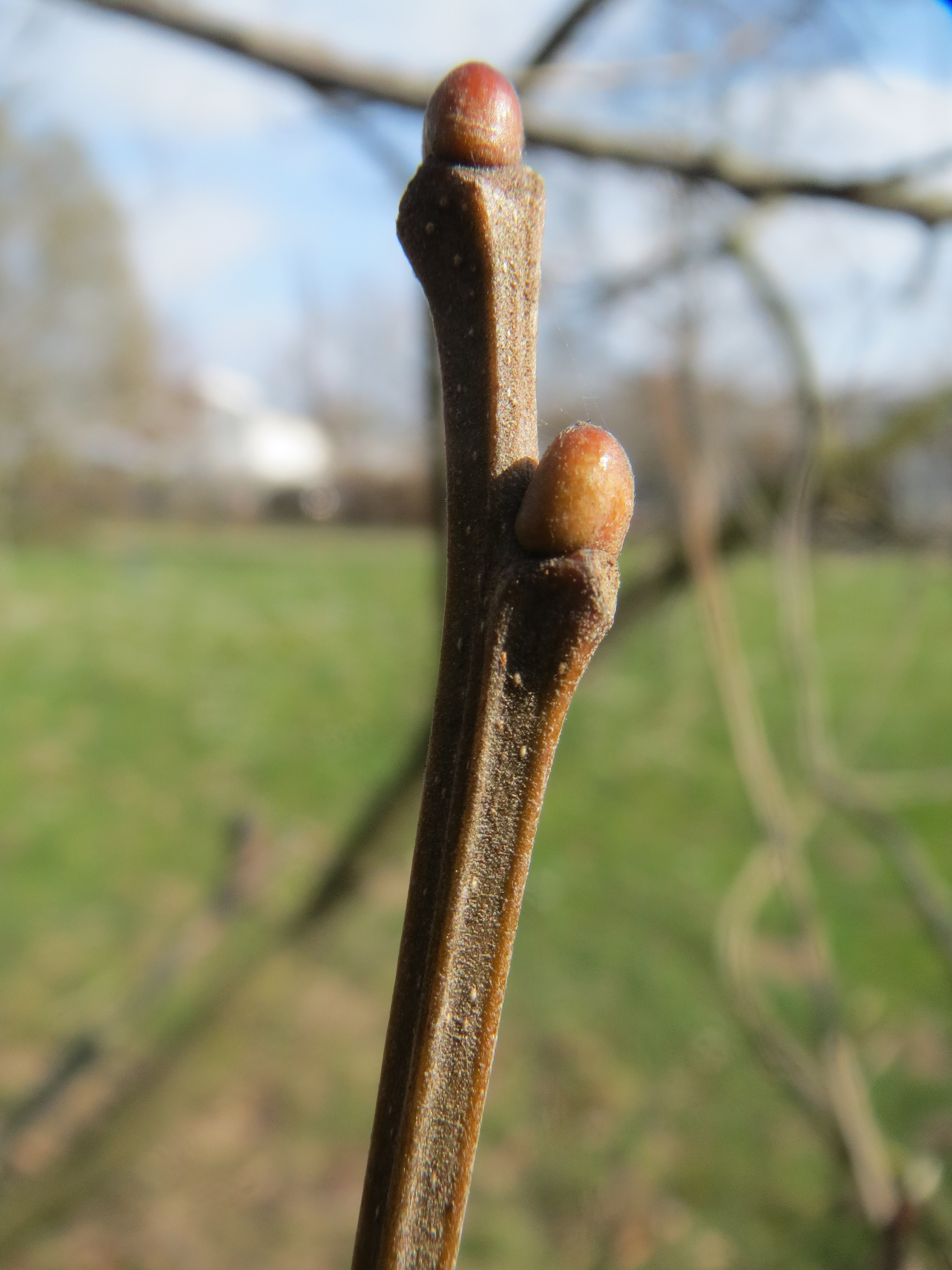
Twig with bud

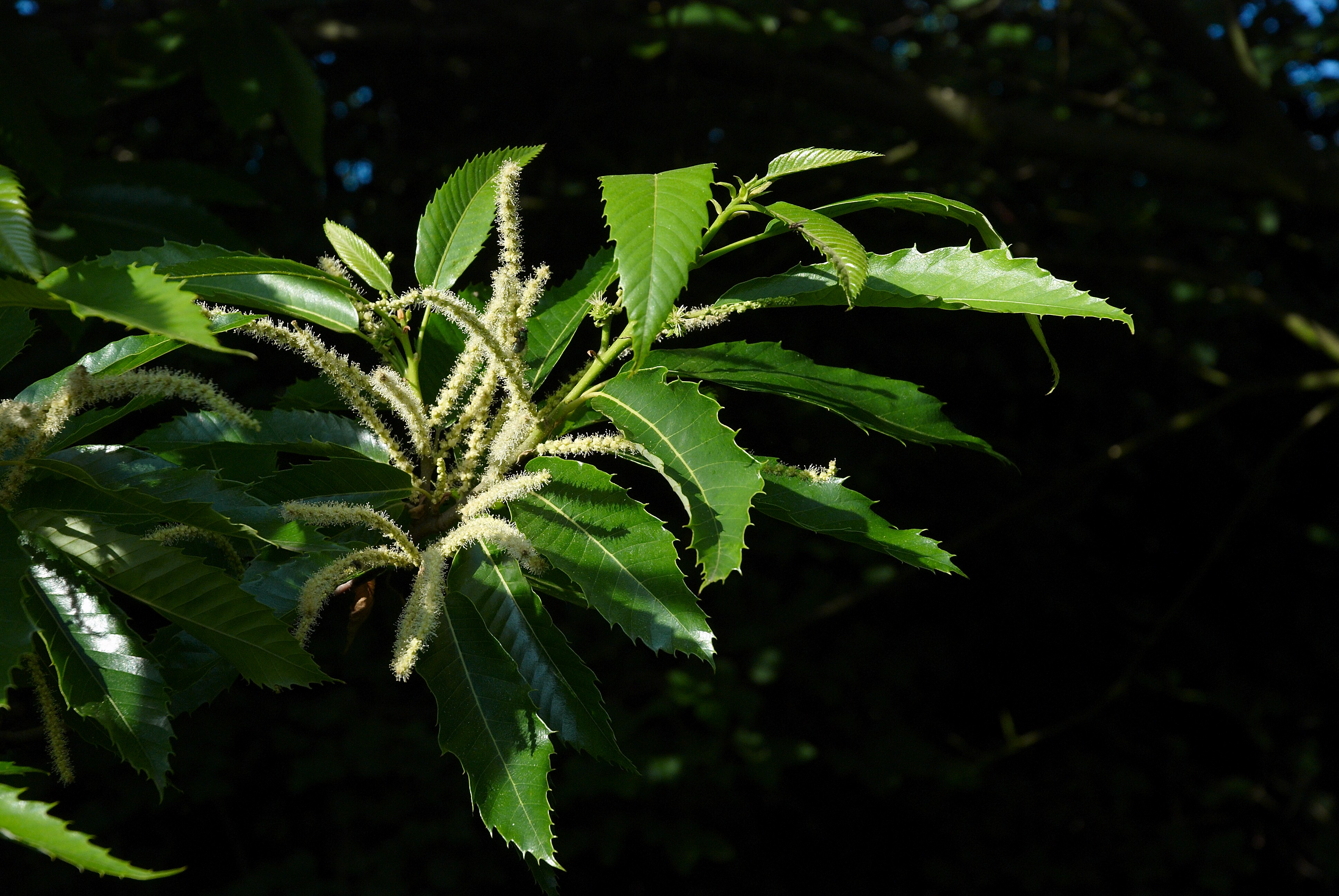
Leaves and inflorescences

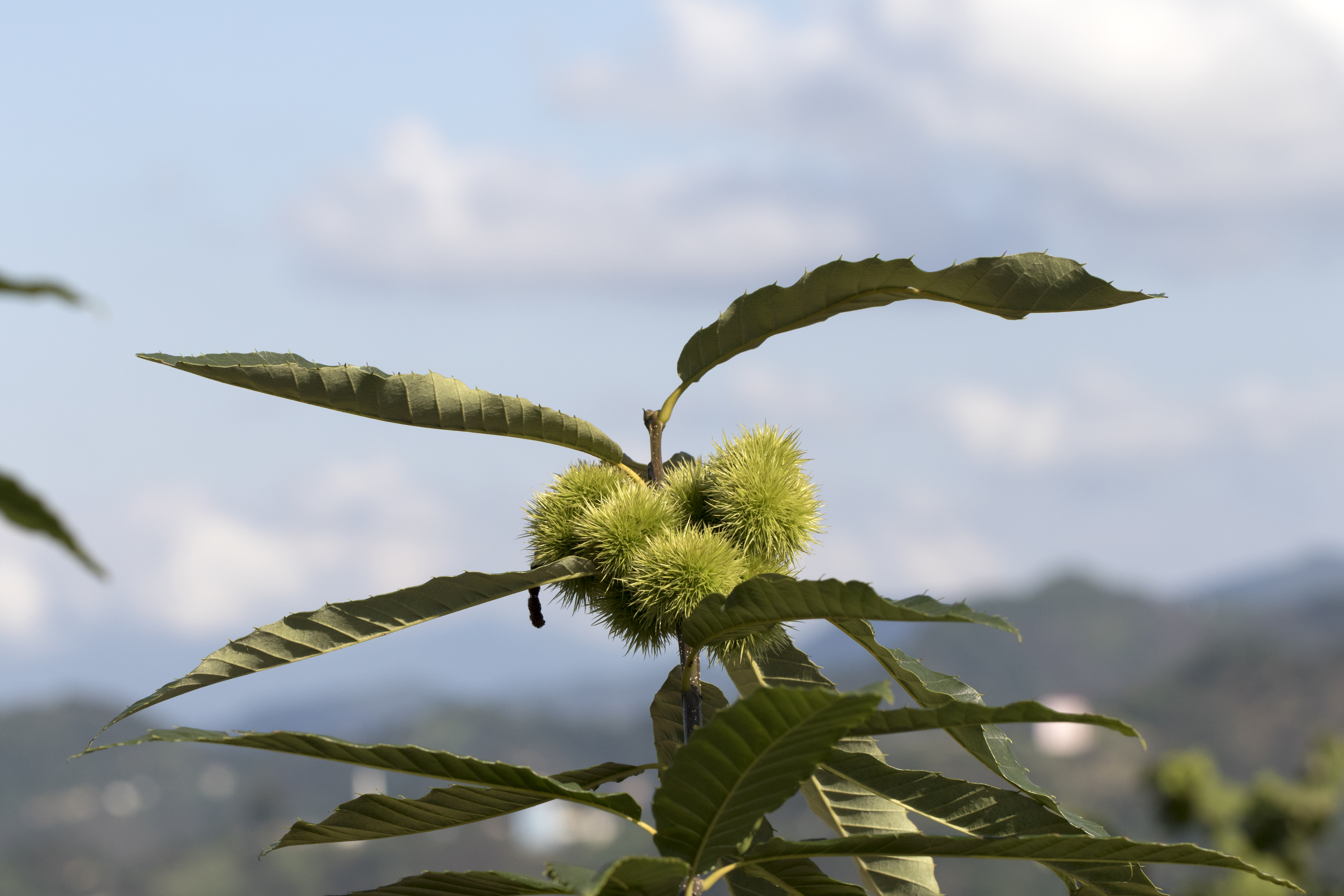
Leaves and fruit

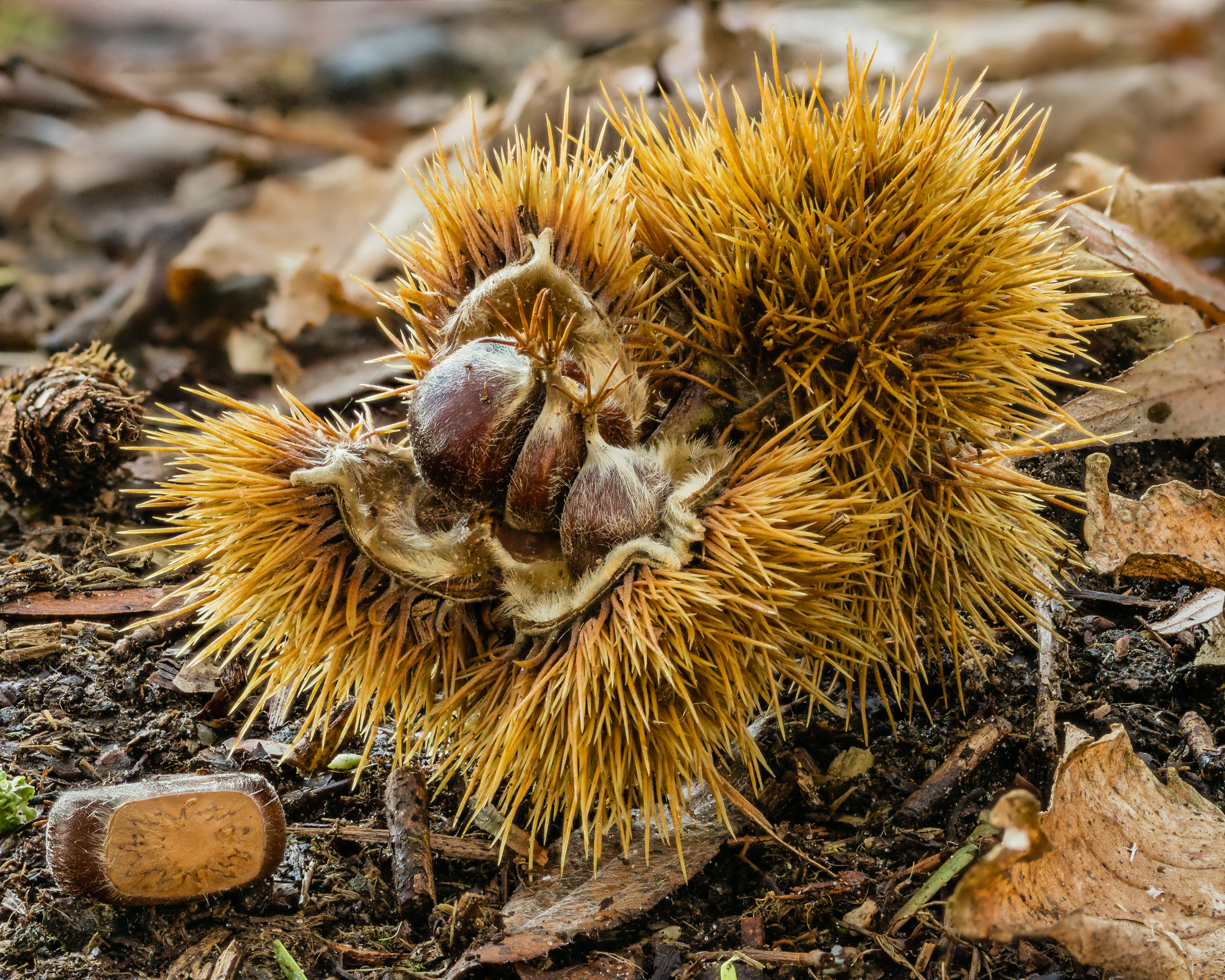
Fallen fruit

== Taxonomy ==
The tree is only distantly related to the horse chestnut Aesculus hippocastanum, which bears superficially similar but inedible seeds (conkers) in a dehiscent seed case (ie. it splits open). Other common names include "Spanish chestnut" or "marron" (French for "chestnut"). The generic name Castanea is the old Latin name for the plant species, while the specific epithet sativa means "cultivated by humans". Some selected varieties are smaller and more compact in growth yielding earlier in life with different ripening time: the Marigoule, the Marisol and the Maraval.

== Distribution and habitat ==
The species is native to Southern Europe and Anatolia. It is found across the Mediterranean region, from the Caspian Sea to the Atlantic Ocean. It is thought to have survived the last ice age in several refuges in Southern Europe, on the southern coast of the Black Sea with a main centre on the southern slope of the Caucasus and in the region of north-western Syria, possibly extending into Lebanon.

The species is widely distributed throughout Europe, where in 2004 it was grown on 2,250,000 hectares (5,600,000 acres) of forest, of which 1,780,000 ha (4,400,000 acres) were mainly cultivated for wood and 430,000 ha (1,100,000 acres) for fruit production. In some European countries, C. sativa has only been introduced recently, for example in Slovakia or the Netherlands.

The tree favours neutral to acidic and well draining soils. It is reasonably drought resistant.

== Ecology ==
The leaves provide food for animals including Lepidoptera such as the case-bearer moth Coleophora anatipennella and the North American rose chafer Macrodactylus subspinosus.

The two major fungal pathogens of the sweet chestnut are the chestnut blight (Cryphonectria parasitica) and the ink disease caused by Phytophthora cambivora and P. cinnamomi. In North America as well as in Southern Europe Cryphonectria parasitica destroyed most of the chestnut population in the 20th century. With biological control, the population of the sweet chestnut is not threatened anymore by the chestnut blight and is regenerating. Ink disease is infesting trees mostly in humid soils, with the mycelium invading the root and resulting in wilting of the leaf. Absence of fruit formation leads to die back of the petal. The ink disease is named after the black exudates at the base of the trunk. Nowadays there are cultivars that are resistant to the ink disease. Phytophthora cambivora caused serious damage in Asia and the US, and it still continues to destroy new plantations in Europe.

Another serious pest which is difficult to control is the gall wasp (Dryocosmus kuriphylus), introduced in Southern Europe from Asia.

== Cultivation ==
=== History ===
Pollen data indicates that the first spreading of Castanea sativa due to human activity started around 2100–2050 B.C. in Anatolia, northeastern Greece and southeastern Bulgaria. Compared to other crops, the sweet chestnut was probably of relatively minor importance and distributed very heterogeneously throughout these regions. The first charcoal remains of sweet chestnut only date from around 850–950 B.C., making it very difficult to infer a precise origin history. A newer but more reliable source are the literary works of Ancient Greece, with the richest being Theophrastus's Historia plantarum, written in the third century B.C. Theophrastus focuses mainly on the use of sweet chestnut wood as timber and charcoal, only mentioning the use of the fruit once when commenting on the digestive difficulties it causes, but praising its nourishing quality. Several Greek authors wrote about medicinal properties of the sweet chestnut, specifically as a remedy against lacerations of the lips and of the oesophagus.

As with the introduction of grape vine and olive cultivation to the Latin world, the sweet chestnut is thought to have been introduced during the colonisation of the Italian peninsula by the Greeks; Pliny the Elder mentions only Greek colonies in connection with sweet chestnut cultivation. Today's phylogenetic map of the sweet chestnut shows greater genetic similarity between Italian and western Anatolian trees compared to eastern Anatolian specimens, reinforcing these findings. Nonetheless, until the end of the pre-Christian era, the spread and use of the chestnut in Italy remained limited. Carbonised sweet chestnuts were found in a Roman villa at Torre Annunziata near Naples, destroyed by the eruption of Mount Vesuvius in A.D. 79.

Clues in art and literature indicate a dislike of the sweet chestnut by the Roman aristocracy. Like Theophrastus, Latin authors are sceptical of the sweet chestnut as a fruit, and Pliny the Elder admires how well nature has hidden this fruit of such little value. Early in the Christian era, people probably started to realise the value and versatility of sweet chestnut wood, leading to a slow spread of the tree's cultivation, a theory that is supported by pollen data and literary sources, as well as the increased use of sweet chestnut wood as poles and in supporting structures, wood works and pier building between A.D. 100 and 600.

Increasing sweet chestnut pollen appearances in Switzerland, France, Germany and the Iberian Peninsula in the first century A.D. suggests that the Romans spread the tree's cultivation. However, other scientists found no indication of such spread before the fifth century. While the husks of sweet chestnuts, dated to the third or early fourth century, have been identified from a Roman well at Great Holts Farm, in Boreham in Essex, England, the find provides no evidence that the fruits originated locally. No other evidence of sweet chestnut in Roman Britain has been confirmed. Indeed, no centre of sweet chestnut cultivation has been detected in Roman times outside the Italian peninsula.

Widespread use of chestnut in western Europe started in the early Middle Ages, and flourished in the late Middle Ages. In the mid-seventh-century Lombard laws, a composition fine of one solidi is set for felling someone else's chestnut tree (Edictum Rothari, No. 301, 643 AD). Since the beginning of the 20th century, due to depopulation of the countryside and the abandonment of the sweet chestnut as a staple food as well as the spread of chestnut blight and ink disease, C. sativa cultivation has dramatically decreased. Nowadays, sweet chestnut production has been seen at a turning point again, because the development of high-value sweet chestnut products combined with changing needs of an urban society is leading to a revival in its cultivation.

=== Cultivation systems ===
Three different cultivation systems for the sweet chestnut can be distinguished:

- Coppicing: Mainly for wood extraction. Standard conditions yield 15 m^{3} wood per ha per year.
- Selve: Fruit production from grafted trees. The trees have a short trunk and a large crown. The trees are planted at a high density, and the ground between the trees is often used as pasture.
- High forest: Wood and fruit production. This cultivation form is less intensive with a yield of 4–12 dt/ha and replacement of trees every 50–80 years. The trees grow from seeds and build a dense canopy.

The field management is dependent on the cultivation system. While cleaning the soil from the leaves and pruning is the norm, the use of fertiliser, irrigation and pesticides is less common and reserved for more intensive cultivation.

Cultivation systems

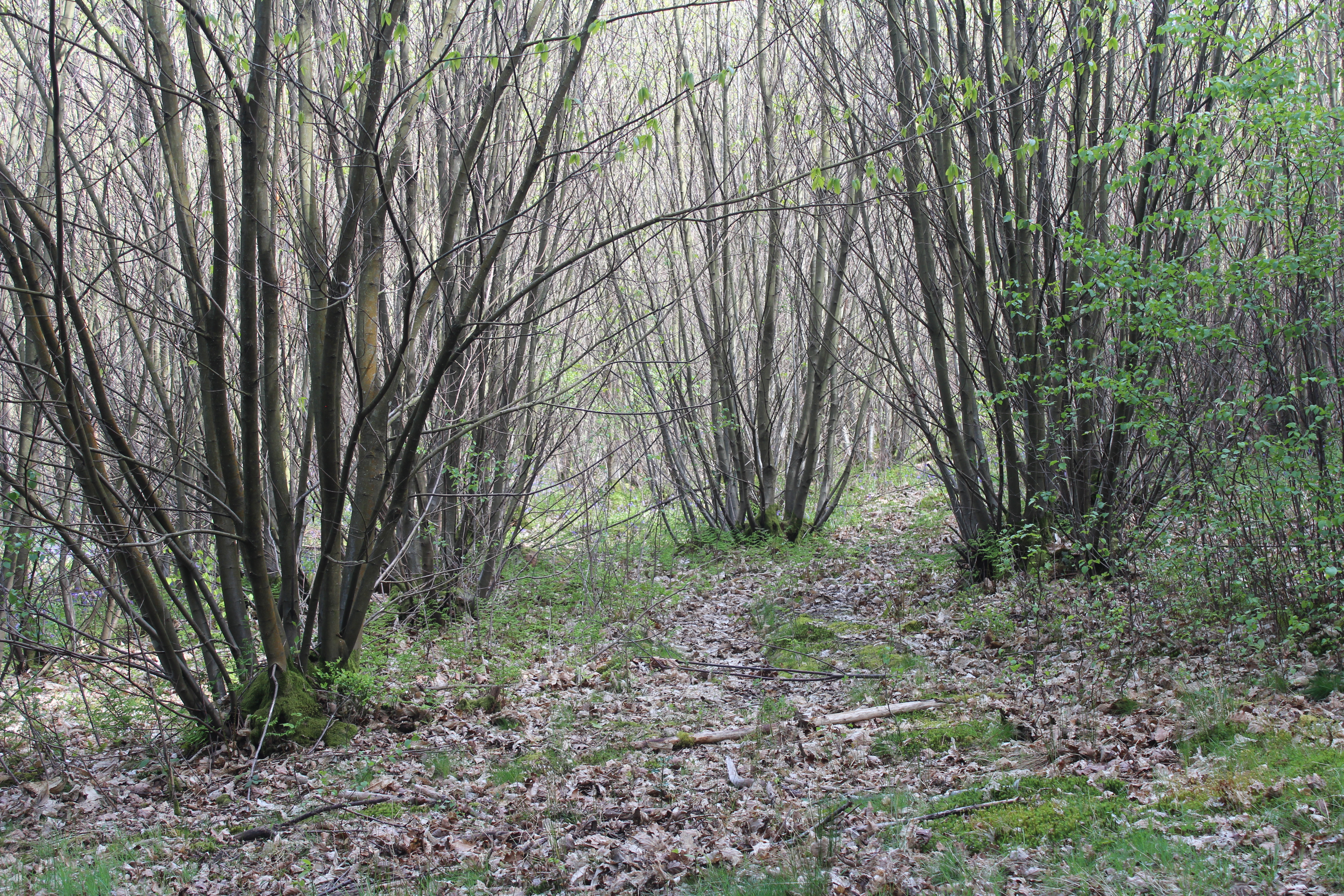
Coppice

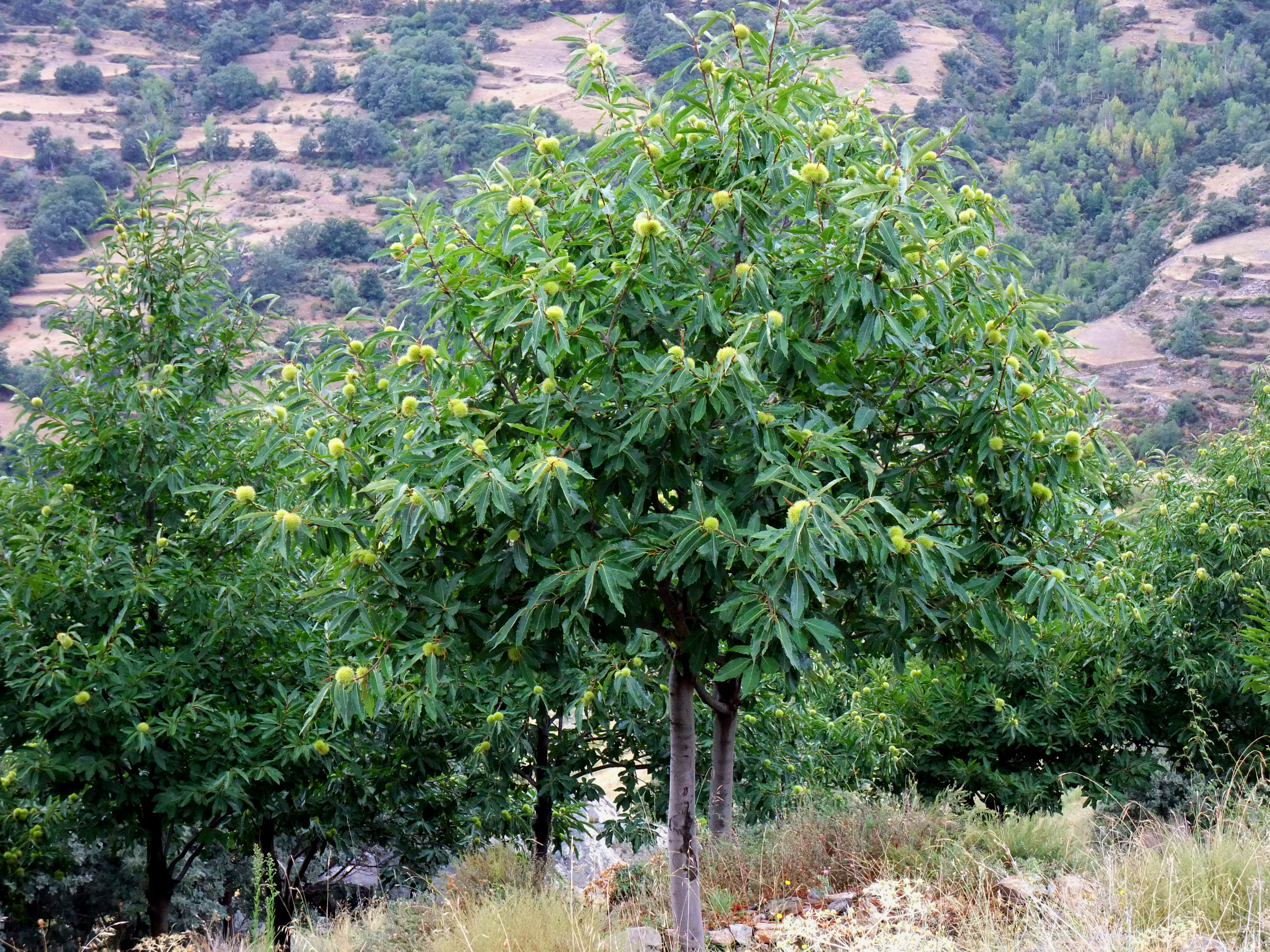
Orchard

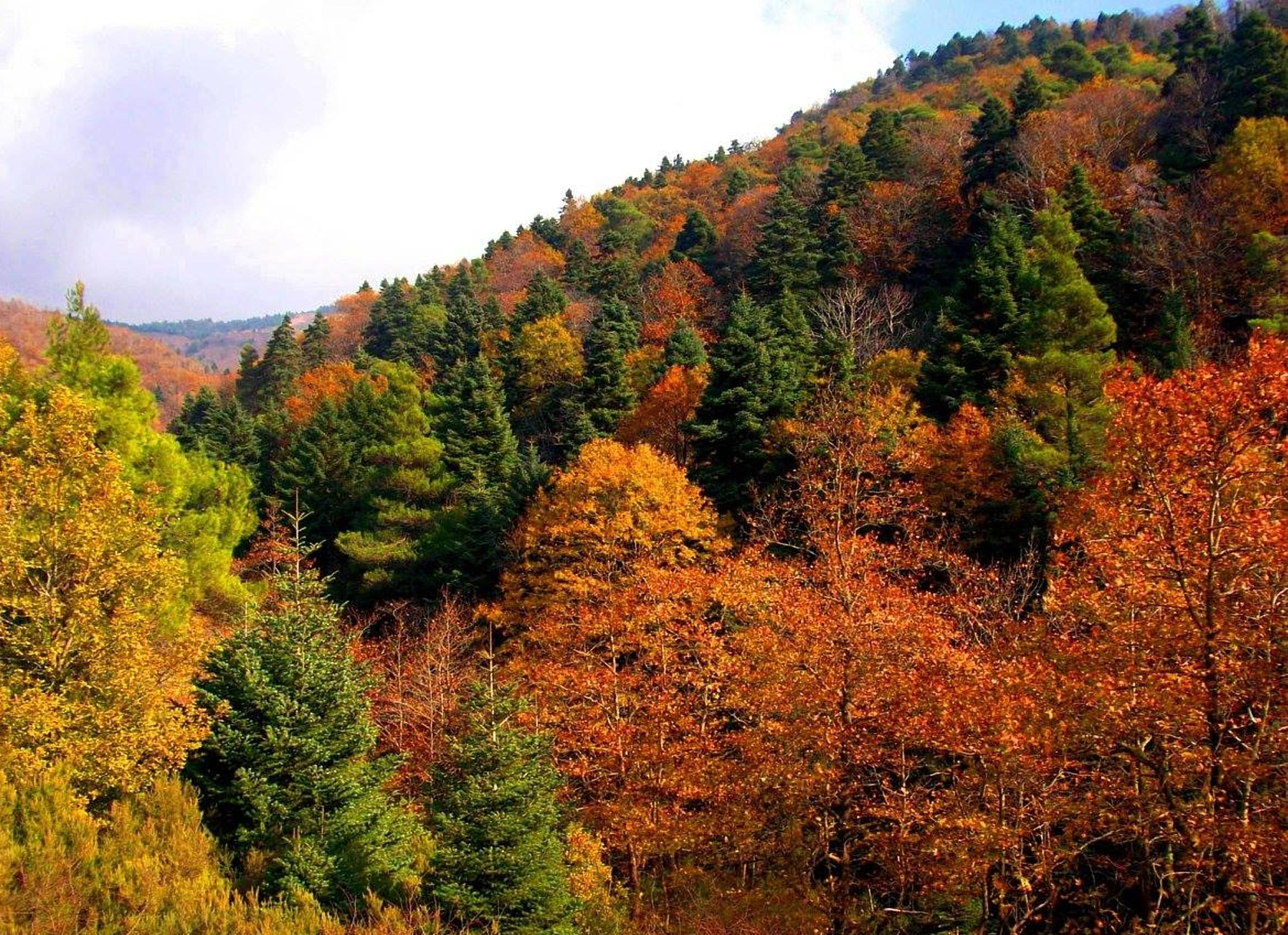
Chestnut-oak-pine forest

=== Requirements ===
The sweet chestnut tree grows well on limestone-free, deeply weathered soil. The optimal pH value of the soil is between 4.5 and 6, and the tree cannot tolerate soil compaction. The tolerance to wet ground and to clay-rich soils is very low. It is a heat-loving tree which needs a long vegetation period. The optimal average temperature is between 8 and 15 °C (46 and 59 °F) and in January the temperature should preferably not be below −1 °C (30 °F) but it may tolerate temperatures as low as −15 °C (5 °F). Low temperature in autumn can damage the fruit. The maximal altitude is strongly dependent on the climate. In general, the climate should be similar to viticulture. Optimal precipitation is between 400 and 1,600 millimetres (16 and 63 in). Before planting, seeds must be stratified at 2–3 °C (36–37 °F) so germination can start 30–40 days later. After a year, the young trees are transplanted.

=== Harvest ===
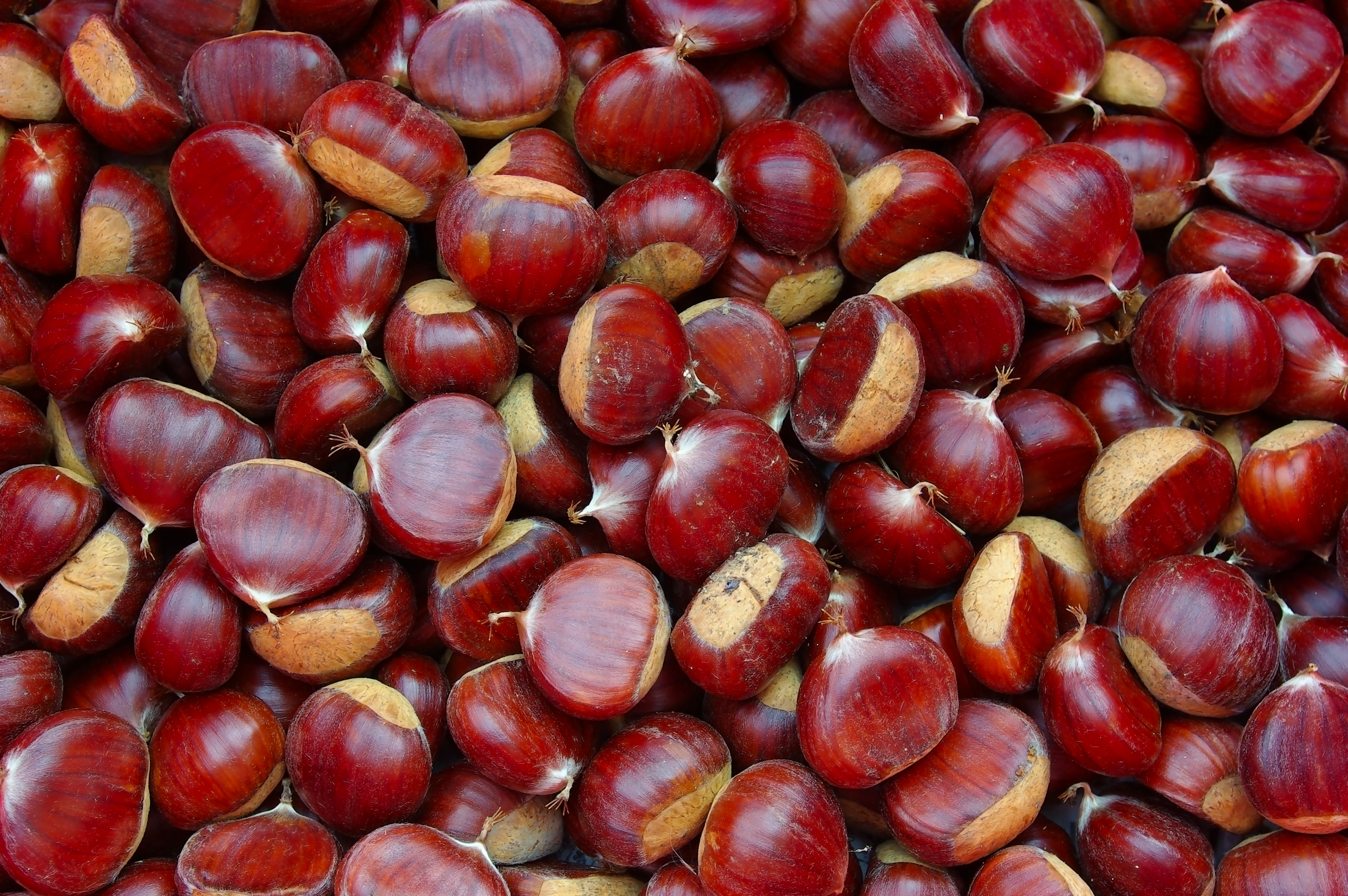
Harvested chestnuts (Castanea sativa) in France

A tree grown from seed may take 20 years or more before it bears fruit, but a grafted cultivar such as 'Marron de Lyon' or 'Paragon' may start production within five years of being planted. Both cultivars bear fruit with a single large nut, rather than the usual two to four smaller nuts.

The fruit yield per tree is usually between 30–100 kilograms (66–220 pounds), but can get as high as 300 kg (660 lb). Harvest time is between middle of September and middle of November. There are three harvesting techniques:

- By hand: The sweet chestnuts are harvested by rake or broom, with a harvest speed of 5 to 30 kg (11 to 66 lb) every hour depending on the soil relief. Also, the capsule makes the harvest more complicated and even painful for the worker.
- By hand with nets: This technique is less time-consuming and protects the nuts from damage. However, setting up the nets is labour intensive.
- Mechanical: The fruit are collected with a machine that works like a vacuum cleaner.

=== Post-harvest treatment ===
The most widespread treatment before storage is water curing, a process in which the sweet chestnuts are immersed in water for nine days. This is to limit the main storage problems threatening the sweet chestnut, fungi development and the presence of insect larvae. As an alternative to water curing, hot water treatment is also commercially used.

After water treatment, the chestnuts are stored in a controlled environment with high carbon dioxide concentrations. In contrast to a cold storage system, where the nuts are stored at low temperatures in untreated air, the controlled environment method avoids flesh hardening which negatively impacts the processability of the product.

=== Cultivars ===
The ornamental cultivar Castanea sativa 'Albomarginata' has gained the Royal Horticultural Society's Award of Garden Merit. Cultivars of French origin include Bouche de Betizac, Maraval, Marigoule, Marsol, and Precoce Migoule. Cultivars of American origin include Colossal and Labor Day.

== Uses ==
=== Food ===
==== Nutrition ====
Sweet chestnut (Castanea sativa), raw, unpeeled
Nutritional value per 100 g (3.5 oz)
- Energy: 891 kJ (213 kcal)
- Carbohydrates: 45.54 g
- Dietary fibre: 8.1 g
- Fat: 2.26 g
- Saturated: 0.425 g
- Monounsaturated: 0.780 g
- Polyunsaturated: 0.894 g
- Protein: 2.42 g
Amino acids
Tryptophan	0.027 g
Threonine	0.086 g
Isoleucine	0.095 g
Leucine	0.143 g
Lysine	0.143 g
Methionine	0.057 g
Cystine	0.077 g
Phenylalanine	0.102 g
Tyrosine	0.067 g
Valine	0.135 g
Arginine	0.173 g
Histidine	0.067 g
Alanine	0.161 g
Aspartic acid	0.417 g
Glutamic acid	0.312 g
Glycine	0.124 g
Proline	0.127 g
Serine	0.121 g
Vitamins and minerals
Vitamins	Quantity %DV^{†}
Vitamin A equiv.	0% 1 μg
Thiamine (B1)	20% 0.238 mg
Riboflavin (B2)	13% 0.168 mg
Niacin (B3)	7% 1.179 mg
Pantothenic acid (B5)	10% 0.509 mg
Vitamin B6	22% 0.376 mg
Folate (B9)	16% 62 μg
Vitamin B12	0% 0.00 μg
Vitamin C	48% 43.0 mg
Minerals	Quantity %DV^{†}
Calcium	2% 27 mg
Copper	50% 0.447 mg
Iron	6% 1.01 mg
Magnesium	8% 32 mg
Manganese	41% 0.952 mg
Phosphorus	7% 93 mg
Potassium	17% 518 mg
Sodium	0% 3 mg
Zinc	5% 0.52 mg
- Other constituents: Quantity
- Water: 48.65 g
- Link to USDA Database entry
- ^{†}Percentages estimated using US recommendations for adults, except for potassium, which is estimated based on expert recommendation from the National Academies.

The edible seeds (also called chestnuts) have a low fat content, dominated by unsaturated fatty acids. Sweet chestnut is a good source of starch. The energy value per 100 g (3.5 oz) of C. sativa amounts to 891 kJ (213 kcal) (table). C. sativa nuts are characterised by high moisture content, which ranges from 41% to 59%. The chestnut provides a good source of copper, phosphorus, manganese and potassium (table). Its sugar content ranges from 14% to 20% dry weight, depending on the cultivar. Fructose is mostly responsible for the sweet taste.

==== Culinary uses ====
The species' large genetic diversity and different cultivars are exploited for uses such as flour, boiling, roasting, drying, and sweets. The skin of raw peeled chestnuts can be removed by quickly blanching the nuts after scoring them by a cross slit at the tufted end. Once cooked, chestnuts acquire a sweet flavor and a floury texture similar to the sweet potato. The cooked nuts can be used for stuffing poultry, as a vegetable or in nut roasts. They can also be used in confections, puddings, desserts and cakes. They are used for flour, bread making, a cereal substitute, coffee substitute, a thickener in soups and other cookery uses, as well as for fattening stock. A sugar can be extracted from them. The Corsican variety of polenta (called pulenta) is made with sweet chestnut flour. A local variety of Corsican beer also uses chestnuts. The product is sold as a sweetened paste mixed with vanilla, crème de marrons, sweetened or unsweetened as chestnut purée or purée de marron, and candied chestnuts as marrons glacés. Roman soldiers were given chestnut porridge before going into battle.

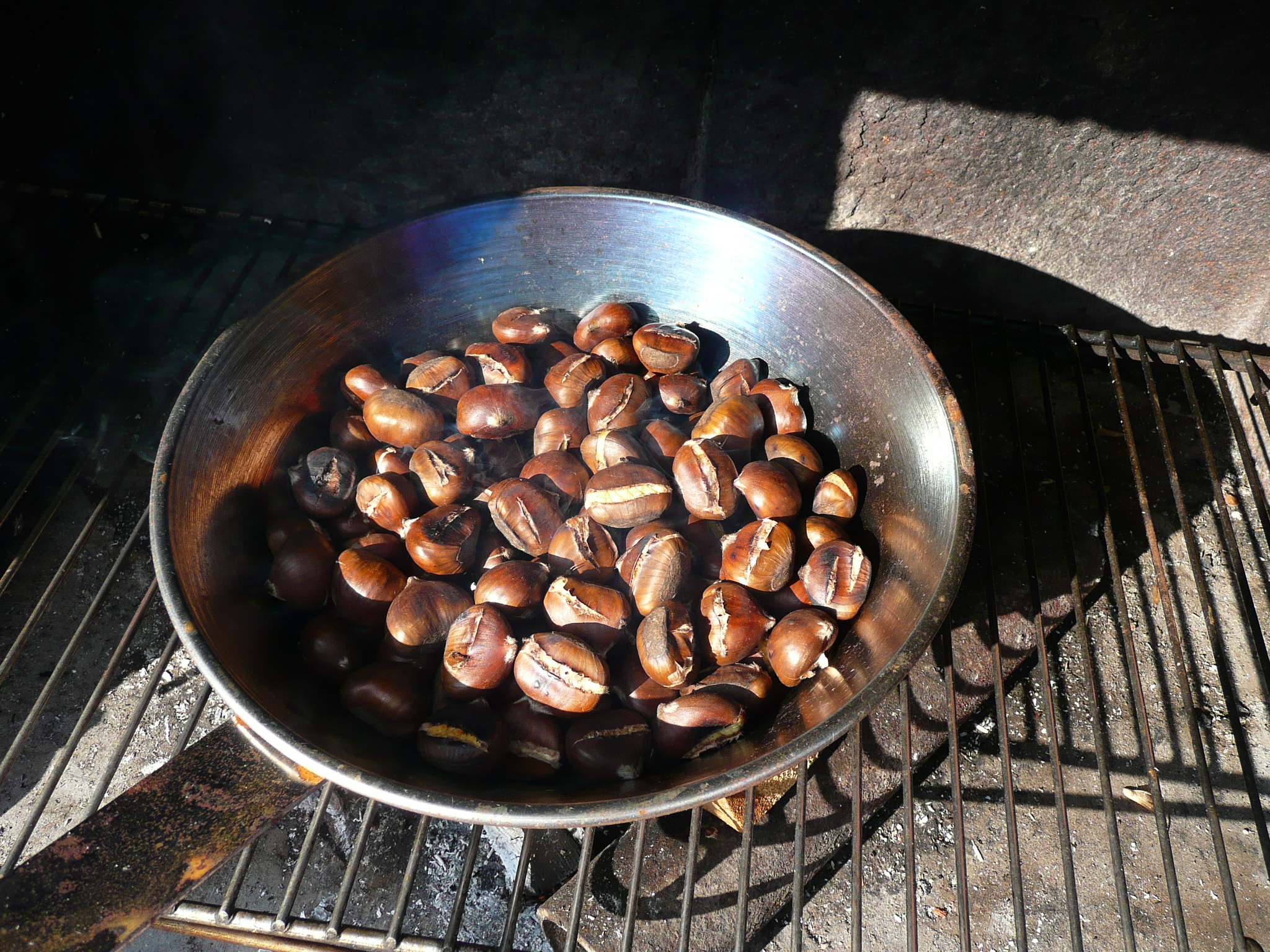
Roasted chestnuts

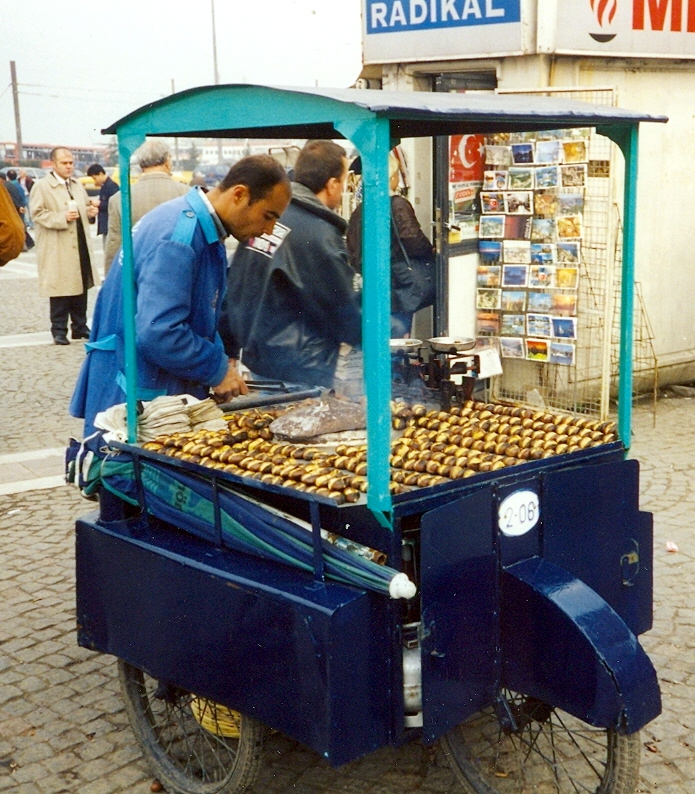
Street vendors in Istanbul

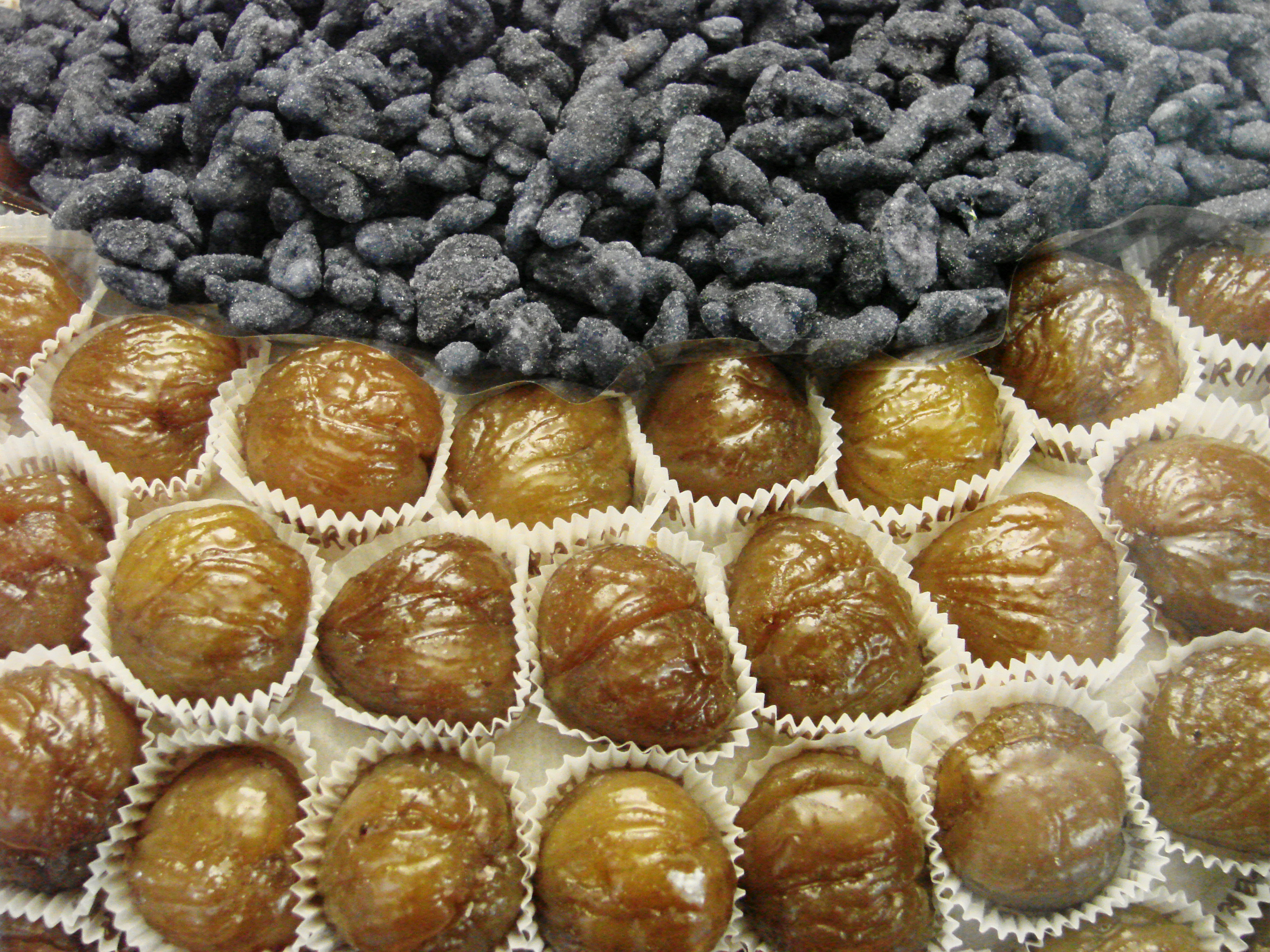
Marrons glacés

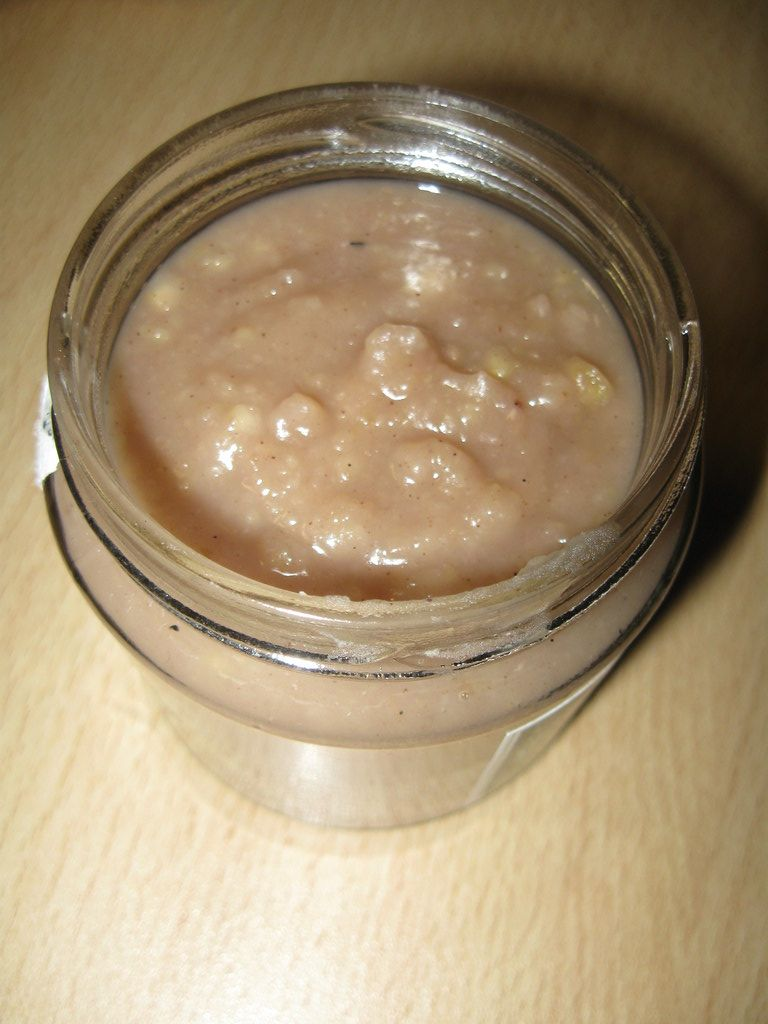
Crème de marrons

==== Effect of processing ====
Most sweet chestnut nuts are consumed in processed forms, which has an impact on the nutrient composition. Its naturally high concentration of organic acids is a key factor influencing the organoleptic characteristics of fruit and vegetables, namely flavour. Organic acids are thought to play an important role against diseases as an antioxidant. Heat appears to be the most influencing factor when it comes to decreasing the organic acid content. However, even after heating sweet chestnuts, antioxidant activity remains relatively high. On the other hand, the consumer must consider that roasting, boiling or frying has a big impact on the nutritional profile of chestnut. Vitamin C content falls by as much as 54% when boiled and by as much as 77% when roasted. Nevertheless, roasted or boiled chestnuts may still be a solid vitamin C source, since 100 grams still represents about 20% of the recommended daily dietary intake.

The sugar content is also affected by the high temperatures. Four processes are decisive for the degrading process of sugar while cooking; hydrolysis of starch to oligosaccharide and monosaccharide, decomposition of sucrose to glucose and fructose, caramelisation of sugars and degradation of sugars. Organic acids are also affected by high temperatures; their content decreases about 50% after frying, and 15% after boiling. Responsible for the aromatic characteristics of cooked chestnuts is the effect of degradation of saccharides, proteins and lipids, the caramelisation of saccharides and the maillard reaction that is reducing sugar and amino acids.

=== Wood ===
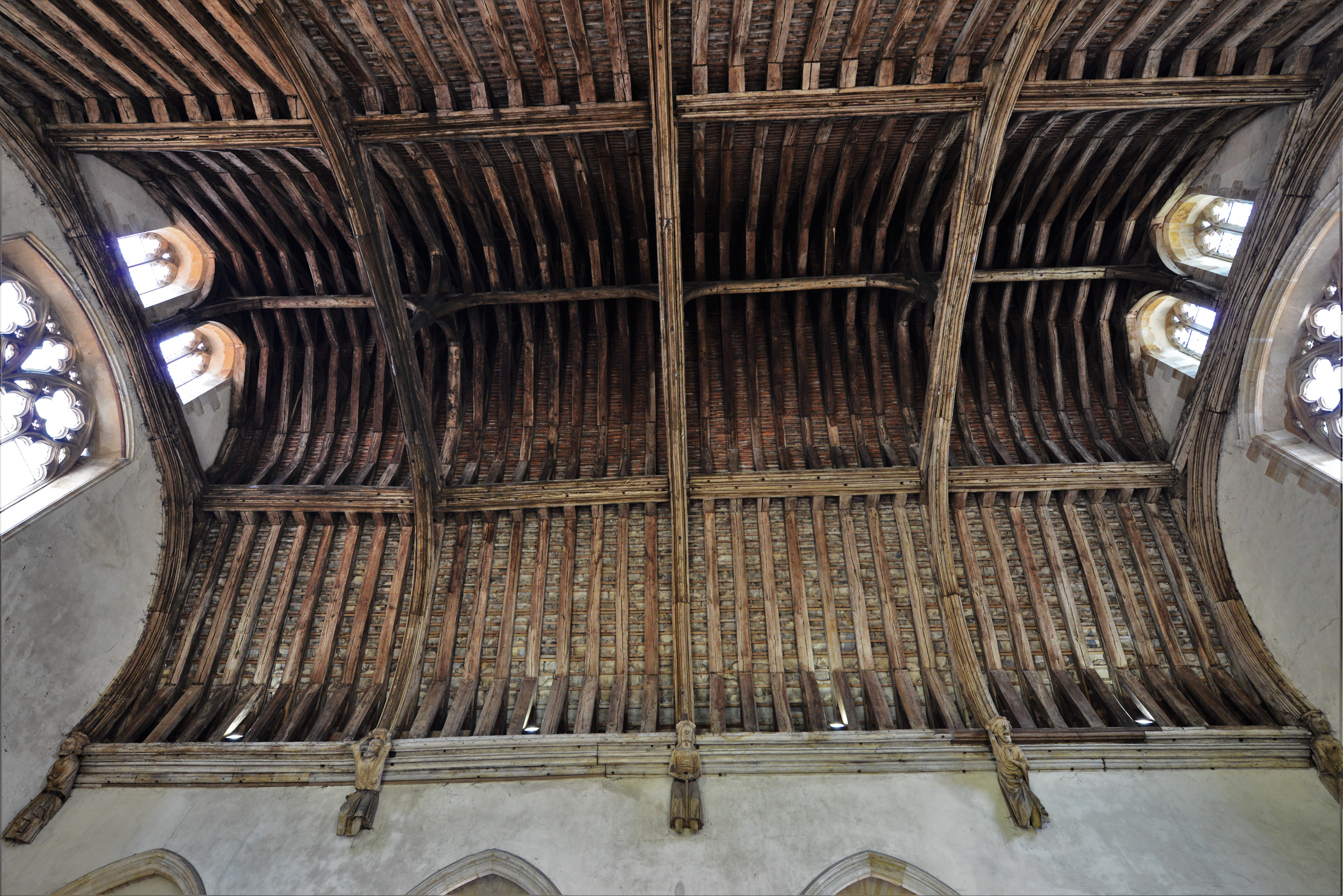
Medieval chestnut roof of Penshurst Place, Kent, England

Sweet chestnut trees respond very well to coppicing, which is still practised in Britain, and produces a good crop of tannin-rich wood every 12 to 30 years, depending on intended use and local growth rate. The tannin renders the young growing wood durable and weather resistant for outdoor use, thus suitable for posts, fencing or stakes. The wood is of light colour, hard and strong. It is used to make furniture, barrels (sometimes used to age balsamic vinegar), and roof beams notably in southern Europe (for example in houses of the Alpujarra, Spain, in southern France and elsewhere). The timber has a density of 560 kg (1,230 lb) per cubic metre, and due to its durability in ground contact is often used for external purposes such as fencing. It is a good fuel, though not favoured for open fires as it tends to spit.

Tannin is found in the following proportions on a 10% moisture basis: bark (6.8%), wood (13.4%), seed husks (10–13%). The leaves also contain tannin.

=== Herbalism ===
Sweet chestnut is one of the 38 substances used to prepare Bach flower remedies, a kind of alternative medicine promoted for its supposed effect on health. However, according to Cancer Research UK, "there is no scientific evidence to prove that flower remedies can control, cure or prevent any type of disease, including cancer".

== See also ==
- American chestnut
- Chinese chestnut
- Japanese chestnut
