= Marrone =

Marrone is an Italian surname meaning "brown". Notable people with the surname include:

- Anthony Marrone, American fire chief
- Calogero Marrone (1889–1945), Italian civil servant
- Doug Marrone (born 1964), American football coach
- Emma Marrone (born 1984), Italian pop/rock singer
- José Marrone (1915–1990), Argentine actor and humorist
- Luca Marrone (born 1990), Italian footballer
- Michael Marrone (boxer) (born 1986), American boxer
- Michael Marrone (footballer) (born 1987), Australian footballer
- Mike Marrone (born 1985), American boxer

== See also ==
- Bruno & Marrone, a Brazilian sertanejo duo
