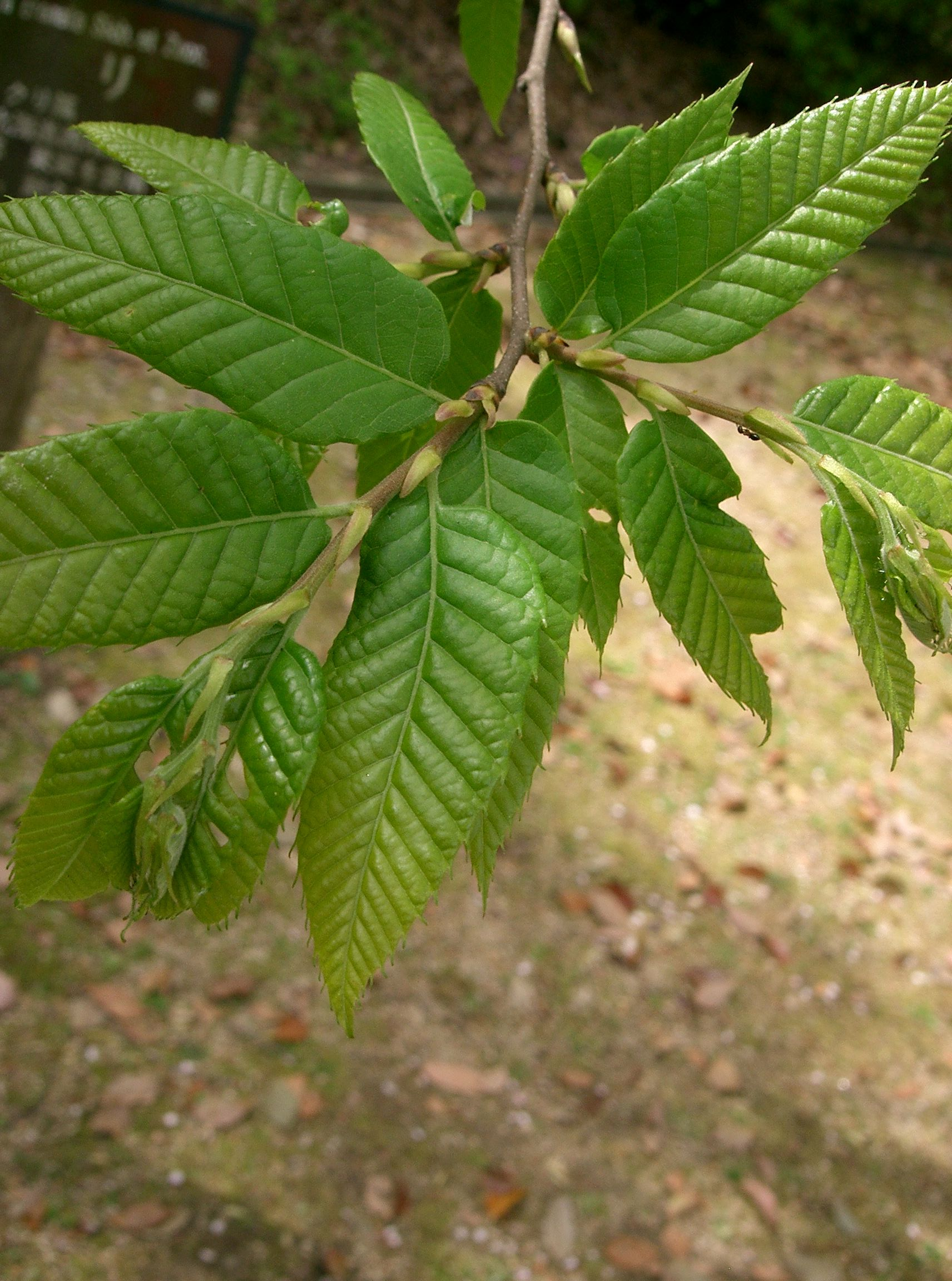

Conservation status
- Least Concern (IUCN 3.1)

Scientific classification
- Kingdom: Plantae
- Clade: Embryophytes
- Clade: Tracheophytes
- Clade: Spermatophytes
- Clade: Angiosperms
- Clade: Eudicots
- Clade: Rosids
- Order: Fagales
- Family: Fagaceae
- Genus: Castanea
- Species: C. crenata

Binomial name
- Castanea crenata Siebold & Zucc.

= Castanea crenata =

Species of flowering plant

Castanea crenata, the Japanese chestnut or Korean chestnut, is a species of chestnut native to Japan and Korea. Castanea crenata exhibits resistance to Phytophthora cinnamomi, the fungal pathogen that causes ink disease in several Castanea species. The mechanism of resistance of Castanea crenata to Phytophthora cinnamomi may derive from its expression of the Cast_Gnk2-like gene.

== Description ==
Castanea crenata is a small to medium-sized deciduous tree growing to 10–15 m (30–50 ft) tall. The leaves are similar to those of the sweet chestnut, though usually a little smaller, 8–19 cm (3 1/4–7 1/2 in) long and 3–5 cm (1 1/4–2 in) broad. The flowers of both sexes are borne in 7–20 cm (2 3/4–7 3/4 in) long, upright catkins, the male flowers in the upper part and female flowers in the lower part. They appear in summer, and by autumn, the female flowers develop into spiny cupules containing 3–7 brownish nuts that are shed during October.

== Cultivation and uses ==
Castanea crenata is an important tree in Japan and Korea for its heavy production of sweet, edible nuts. A number of cultivars have been selected for large nut size. It is also widely cultivated in eastern China and Taiwan.

It is resistant to chestnut blight and to ink disease, and for these reasons is of importance in North America in the development of disease-resistant hybrids and genetic engineering of the American chestnut, which is susceptible to both fungal pathogens.

Examples of Japanese chestnut cultivars are:

- 'Tsukuba'
- 'Tanzawa'
- 'Ginyose'
- 'Arima'
- 'Ishizuchi'
- 'Okkwanng'
- 'Porotan'
- 'Sandae'

Examples of European × Japanese hybrid cultivars are:

- 'Colossal'
- 'Bouche de Betizac'
- 'Precoce Migoule'
- 'Labor Day'

C. crenata produces more biomass in its stems when the nuts are smaller and planted deeper.

== Gallery ==
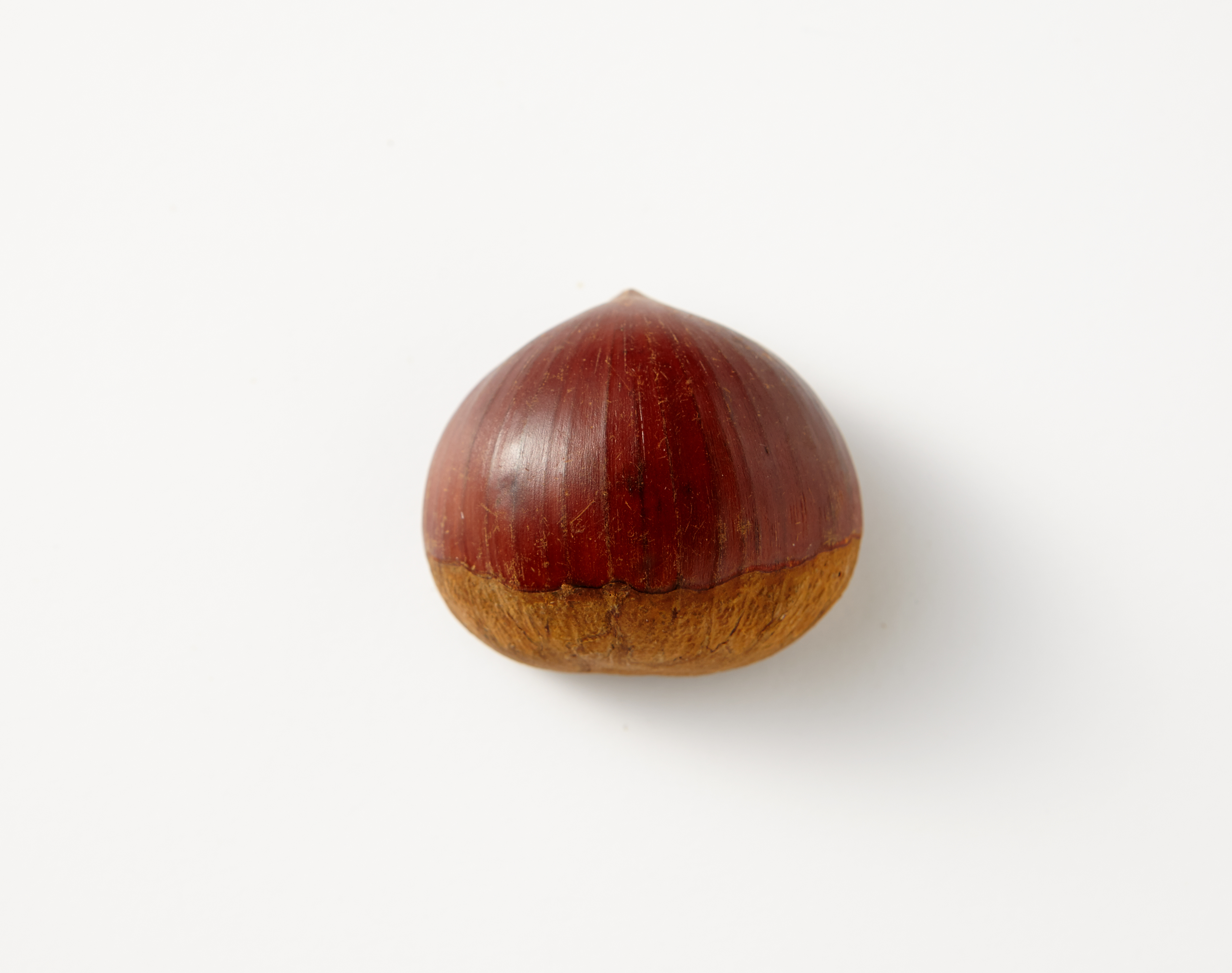
Chestnut fruit

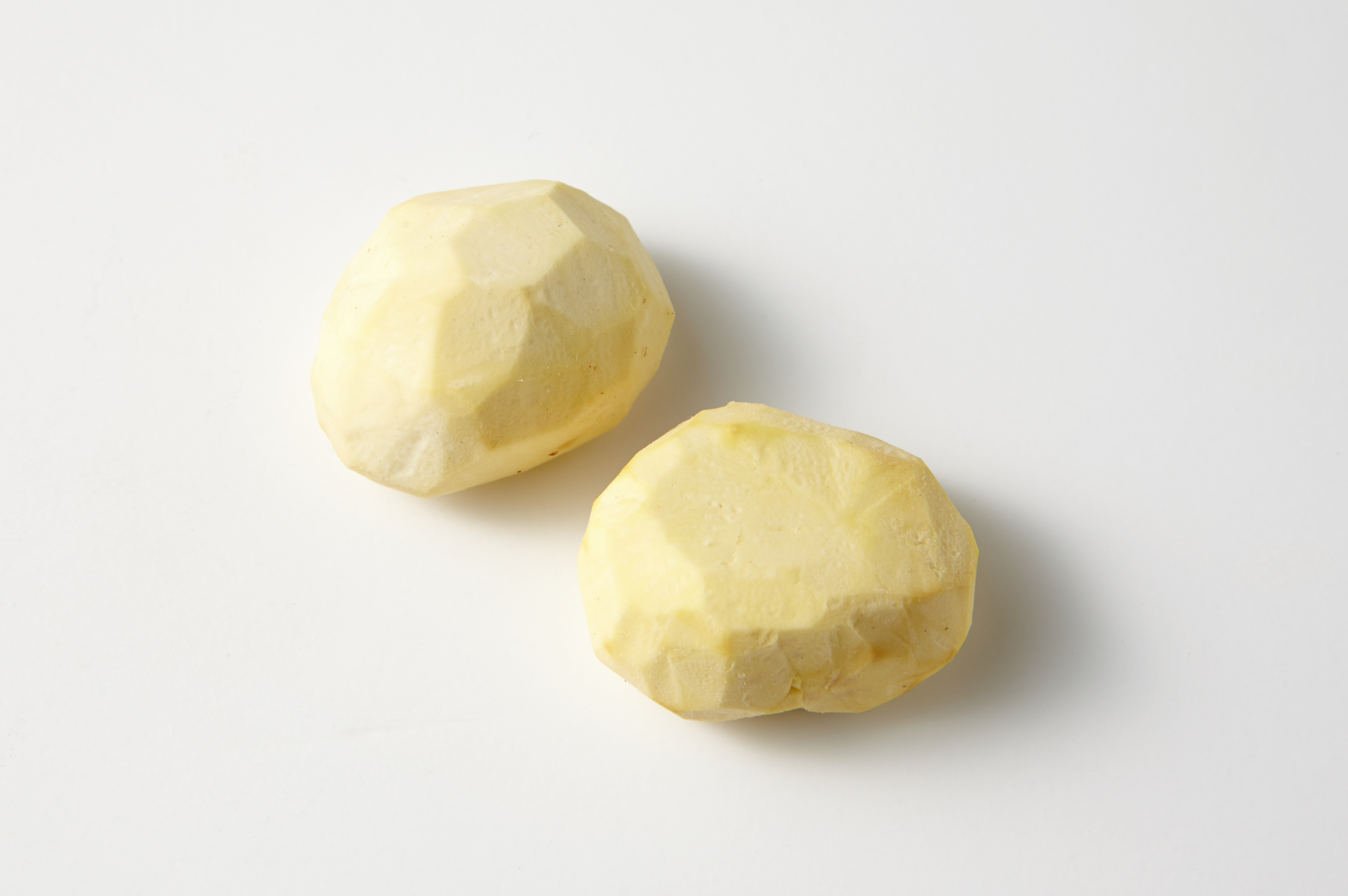
Peeled chestnuts

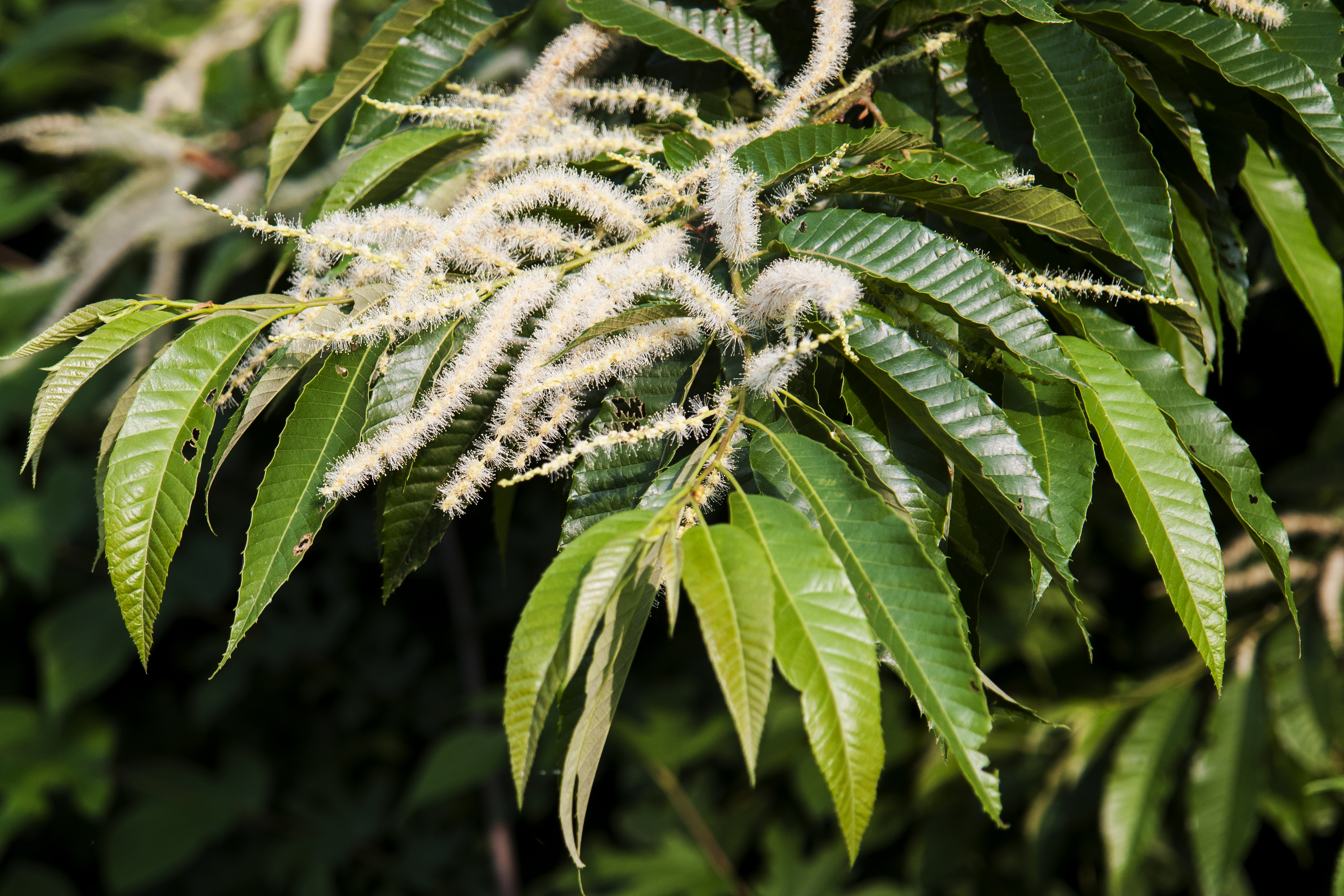
Male flower

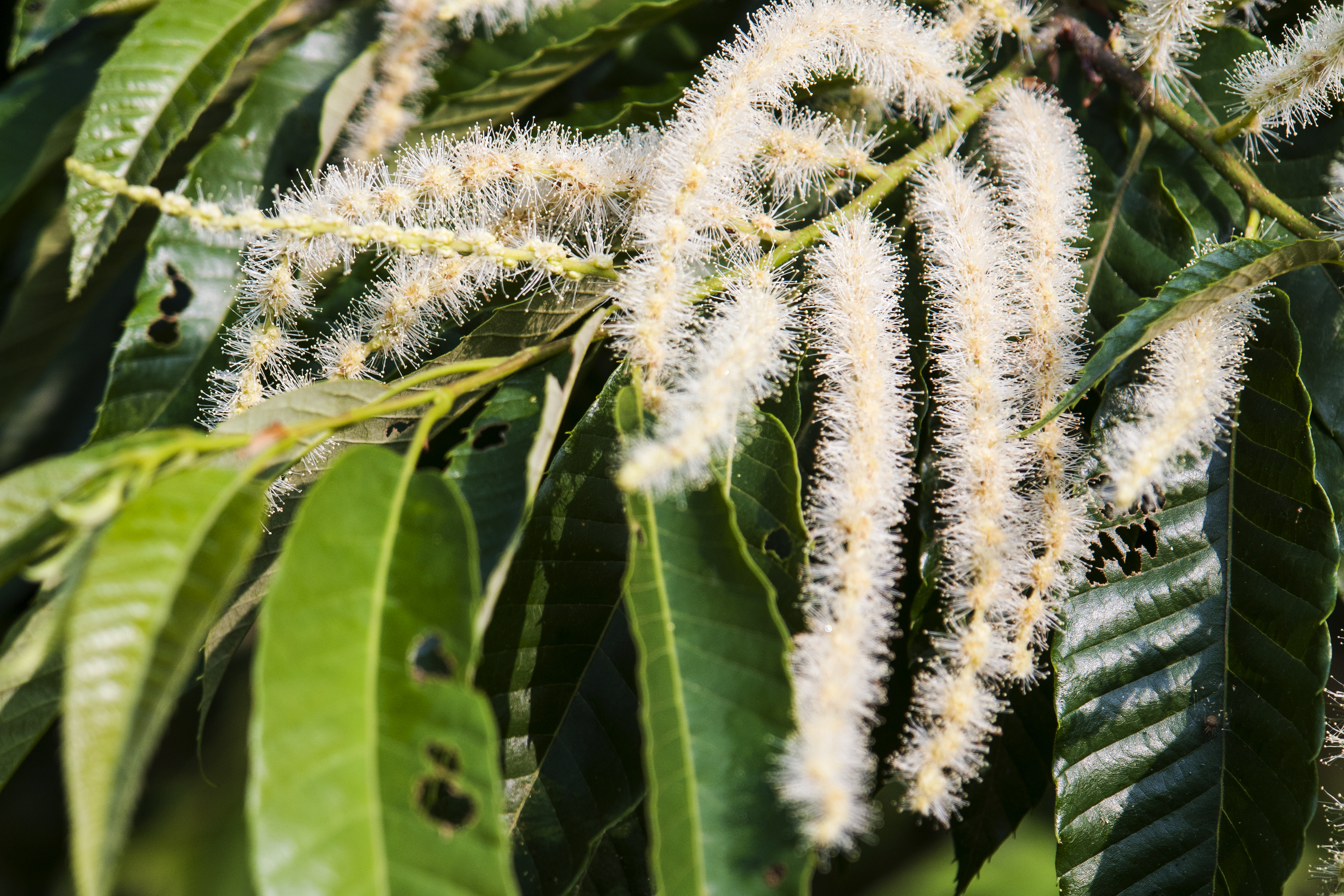

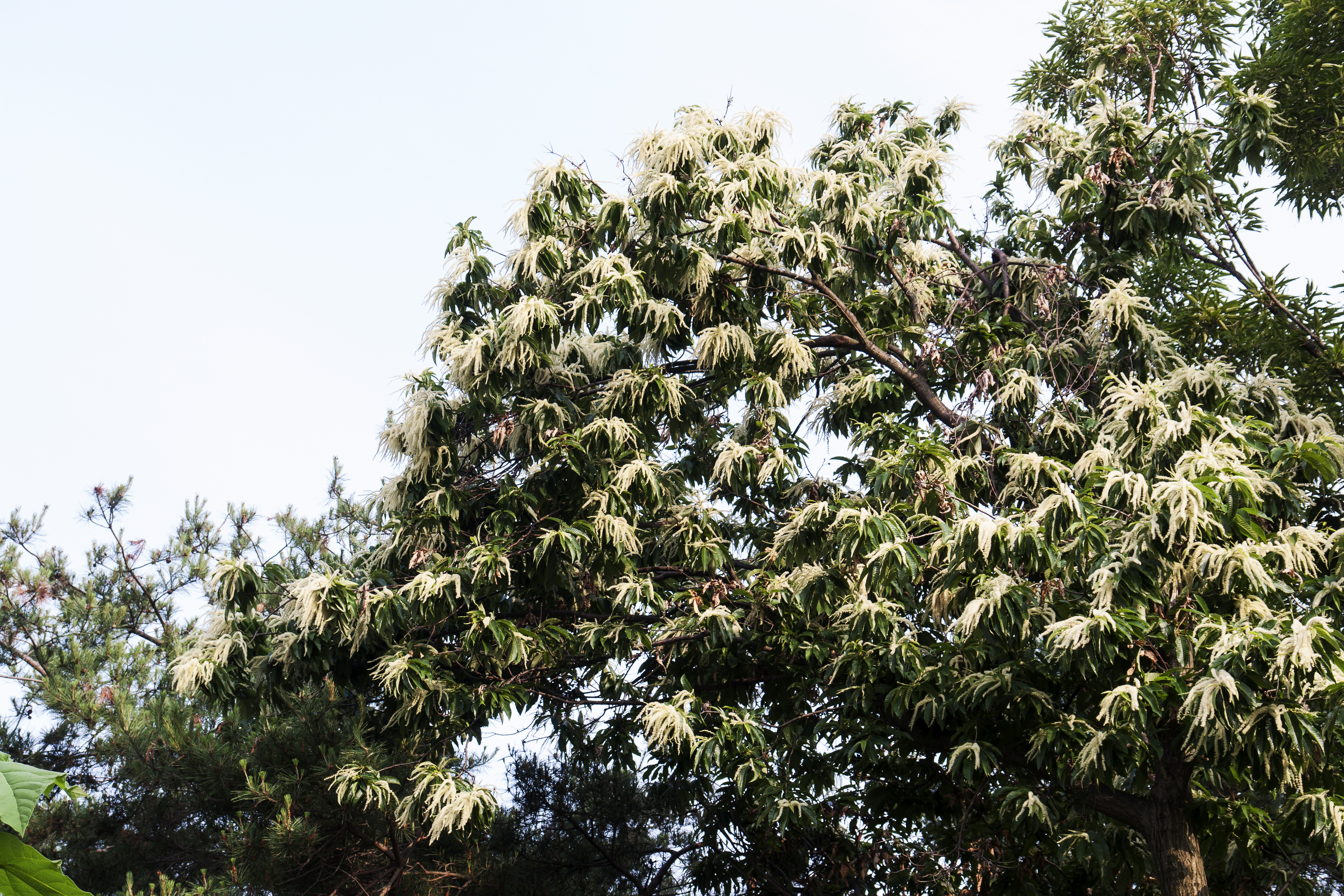

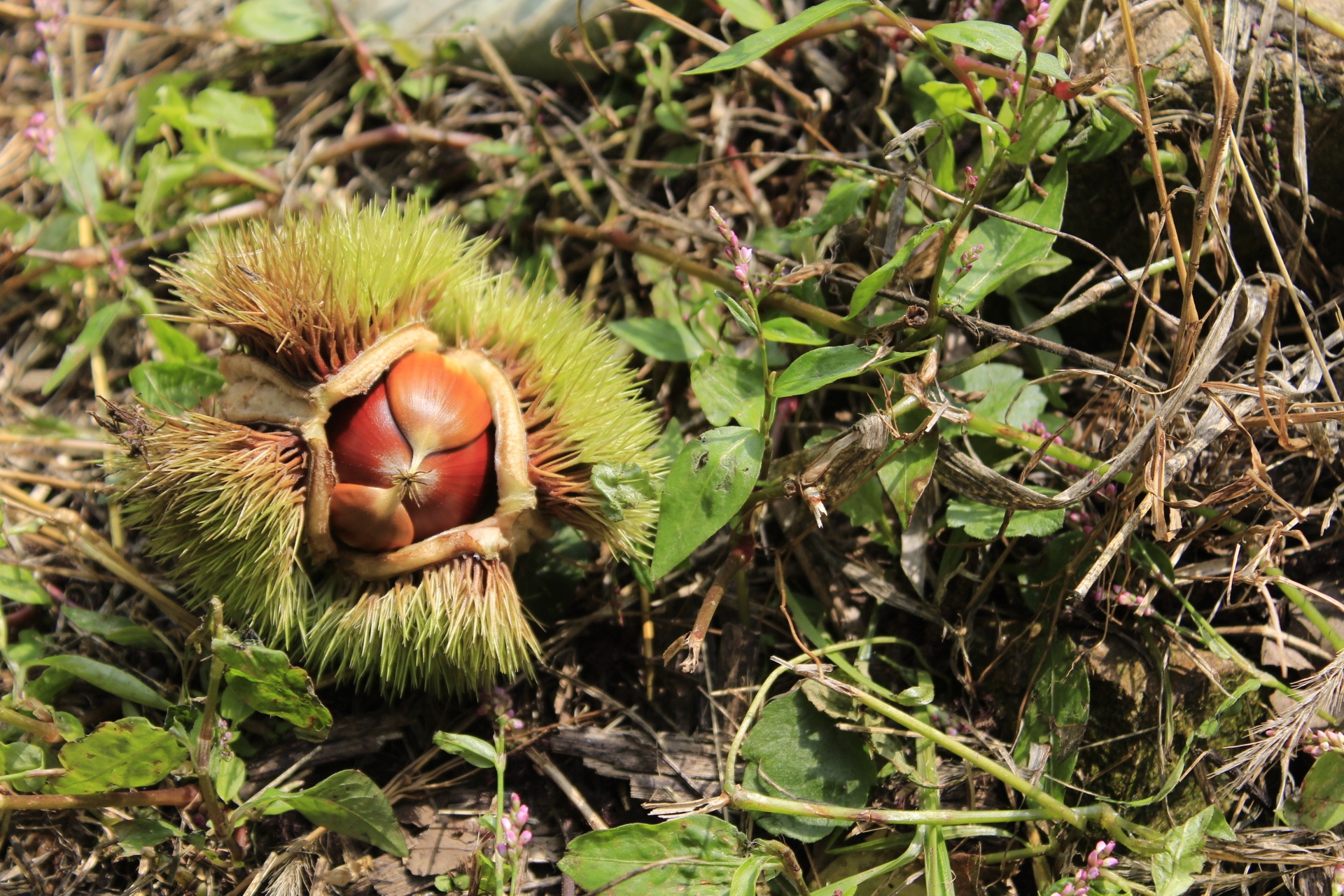
Shell opened naturally on the ground

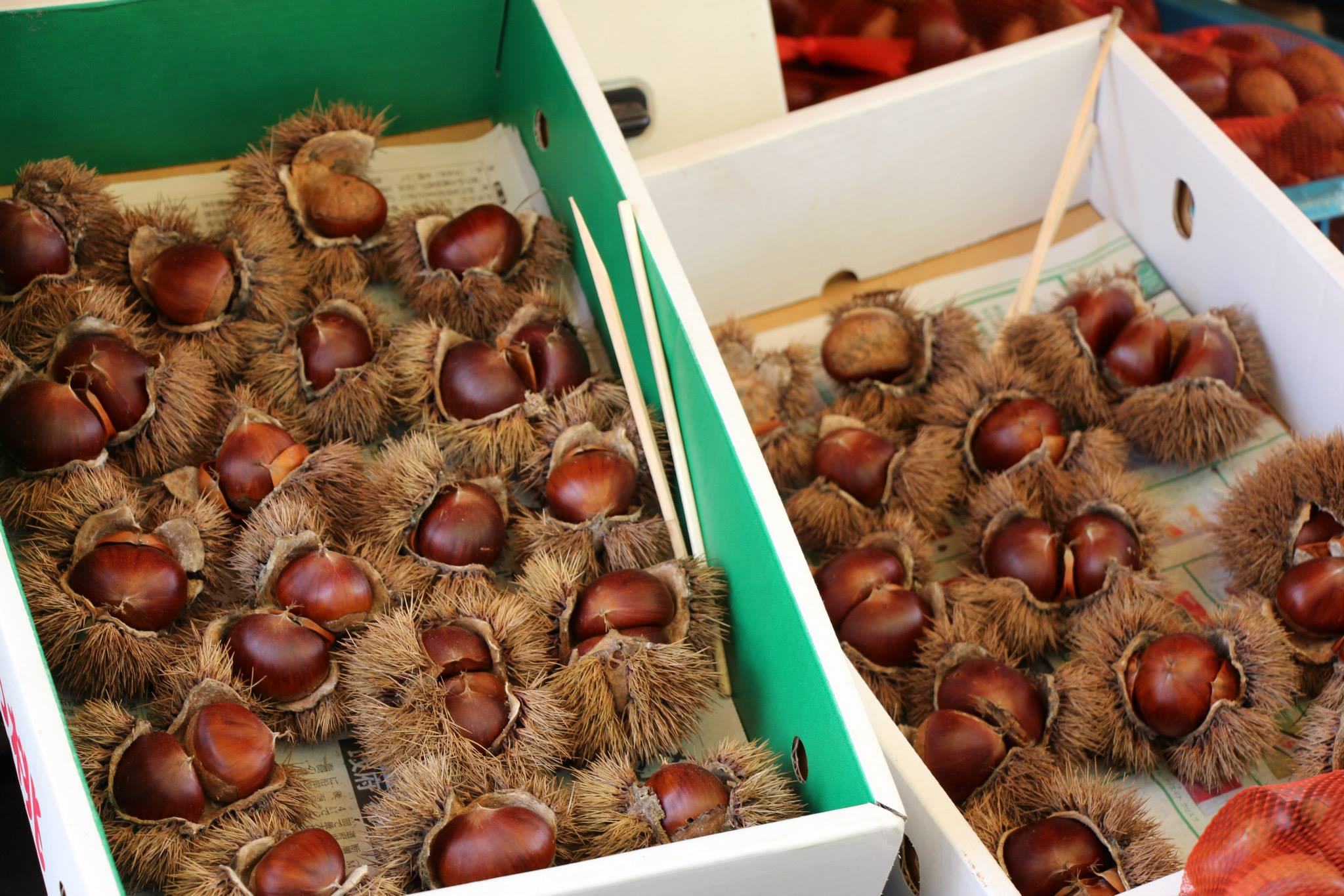

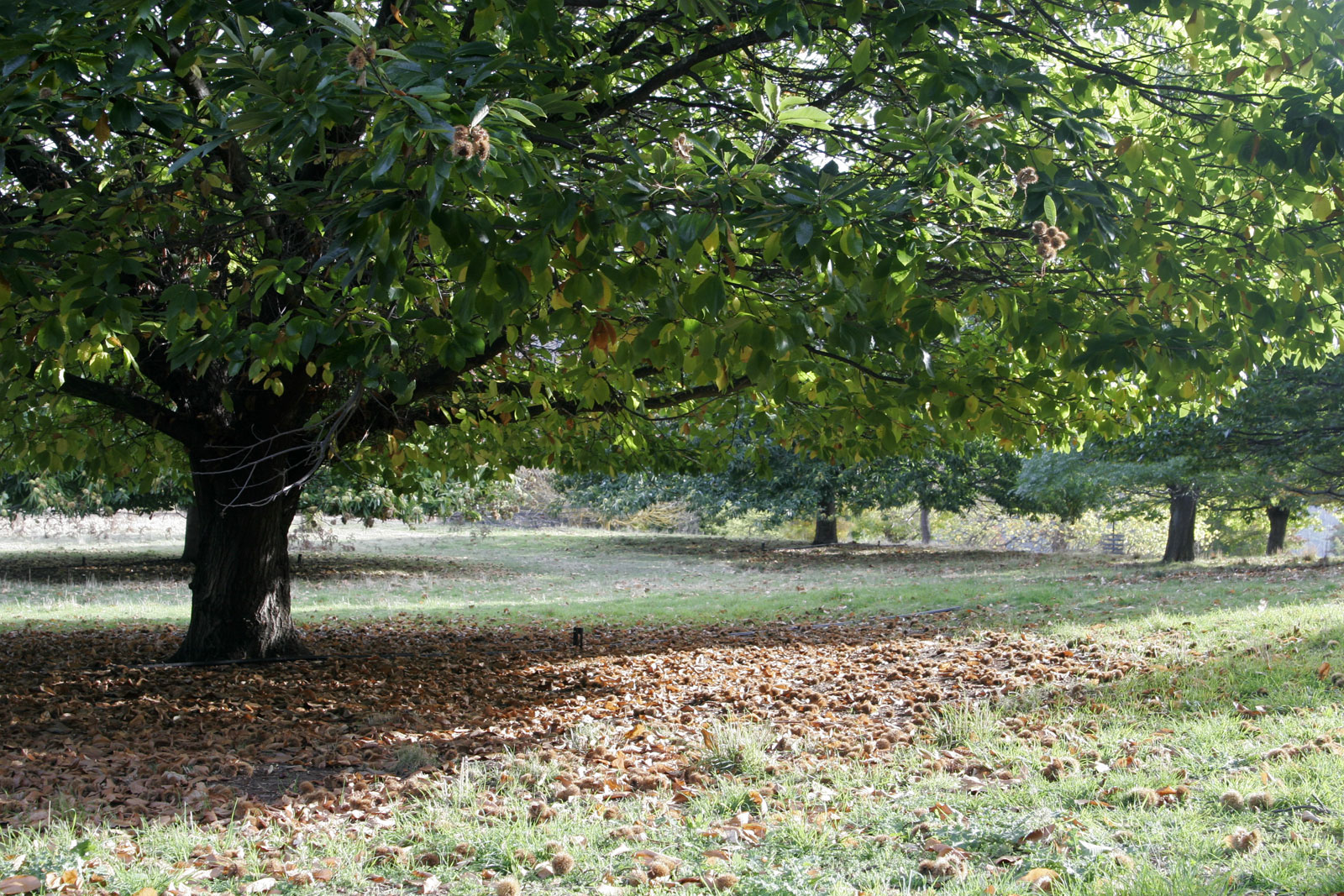
Trees
