= Civitanova =

Civitanova may refer to:

- Civitanova Marche, comune in the Province of Macerata in the Italian region Marche
- Civitanova del Sannio, comune in the Province of Isernia in the Italian region Molise
- Civitanova Marche Lighthouse, an active lighthouse located in front of the Port of Civitanova Marche, Marche on the Adriatic Sea
