= San Paolo Apostolo, Civitanova Marche =

Roman Catholic church in Marche, Italy

Coordinates: 43°18′57″N 13°40′51″E

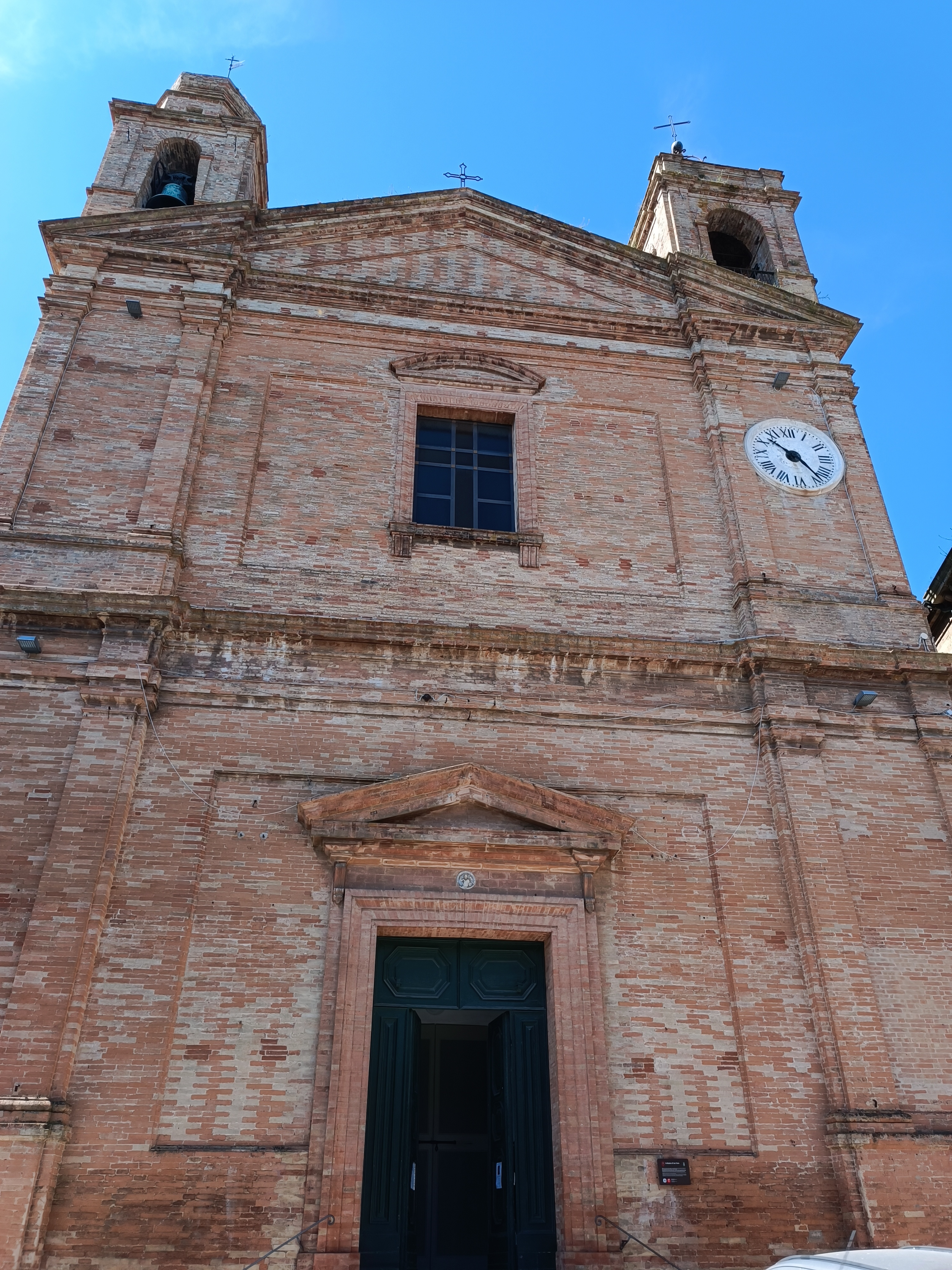

San Paolo Apostolo is a Roman Catholic church located facing the Piazza della Libertà in the upper town of Civitanova Marche (Civitanova Alta), in the province of Macerata, region of Marche, Italy.

== History ==
The church was first erected in 1212, and made a collegiate church in 1592 by pope Clement VIII. In 1734–1753, the church was entirely rebuilt under designs of Pietro Loni; the former layout had the church transverse to the piazza. The sober brick facade has two bell towers.

The reconstruction razed the town clock and watch tower. The interior conserves a painting depicting the Nativity of the Virgin (15th century) by Andrea Briotti and a depiction of the Crucifixionby Durante Nobili. The organ is attributed to Antonio Callido. The baptismal font from the 15th century has part of a Roman capital linked to the martyrdom of St Marone.
