= Church of Saint Chrysogonus =

Church of Saint Chrysogonus may refer to:

- Church of Saint Chrysogonus, Zadar
- San Crisogono, Rome
- Church of Santi Crisogono e Benedetto, adjacent to the Monastery of San Giuseppe, Mogliano
