= San Marone, Civitanova Marche =

Roman Catholic church in the Italian comune of Civitanova Marche

Coordinates: 43°18′20″N 13°43′22″E

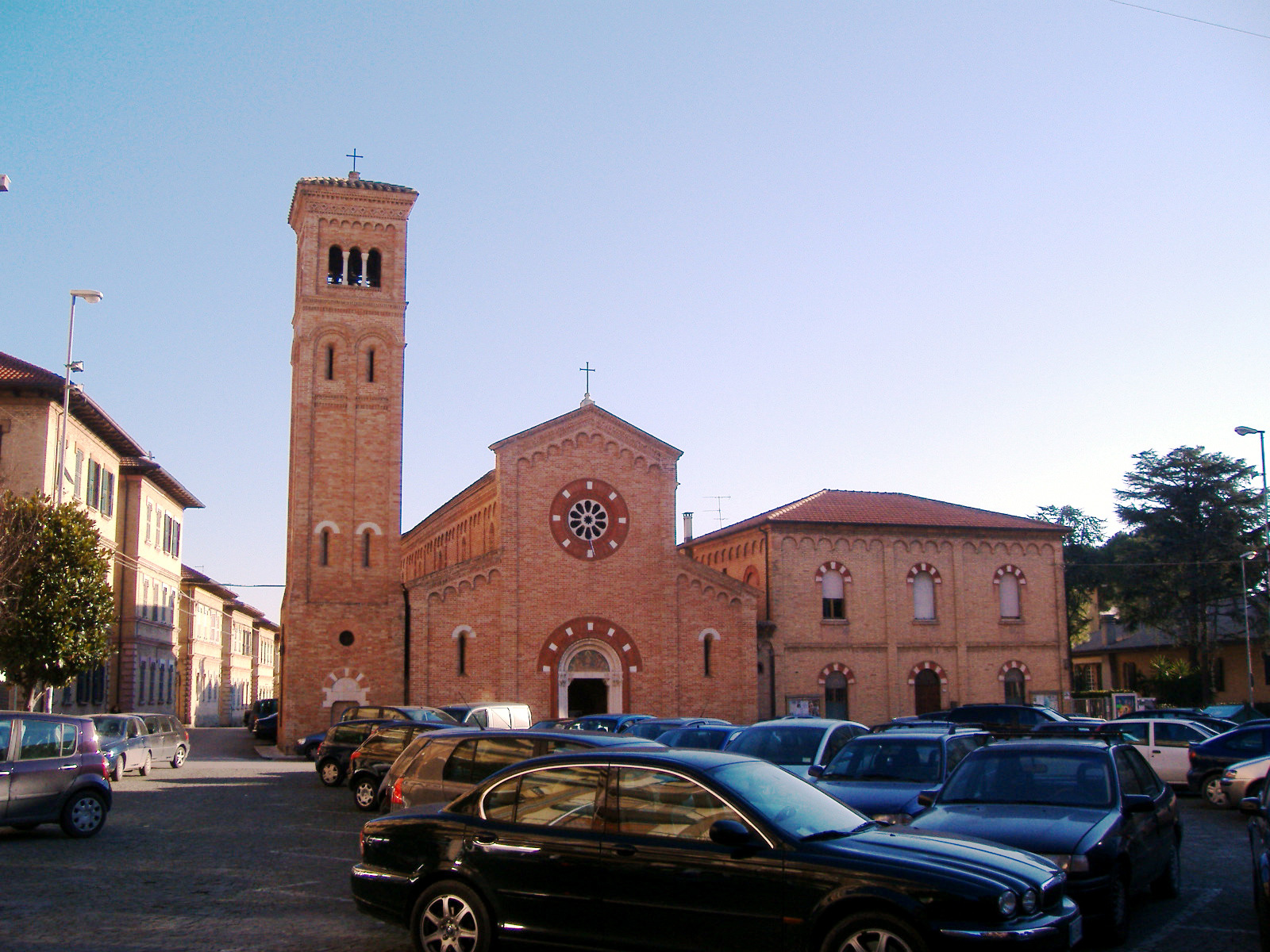
Saint Maron's church, in Civitanova Marche, Italy

San Marone is a Roman Catholic church located in the Italian comune of Civitanova Marche. It is currently administered by the Salesian order.

== History ==
The church is currently located on the site where the patron saint of the town, San Marone, was believed to be martyred in the 2nd century AD. The church was established in the 9th century to store his relics. The ancient church and the surrounding hamlet were nearly destroyed in the medieval period by the townsmen of Fermo. The church was rebuilt in the 19th century with a Gothic Revival-style under the designs of Giuseppe Sacconi. The brick facade is decorated with a central rosette, and the windows are narrow, except for a mullioned series in the belfry of the bell tower. Following the restorations that took place in the aftermath of World War II, some of the earlier foundations were uncovered. The main portal of the facade has a late 19th century fresco painted by Sigismondo Nardi.
