= Upper Town of San Benedetto del Tronto =

Historic sector in San Benedetto del Tronto, Italy

Upper Town of San Benedetto del Tronto: Castrum Sancti Benedicti (Latin); Paese Alto di San Benedetto (Italian)
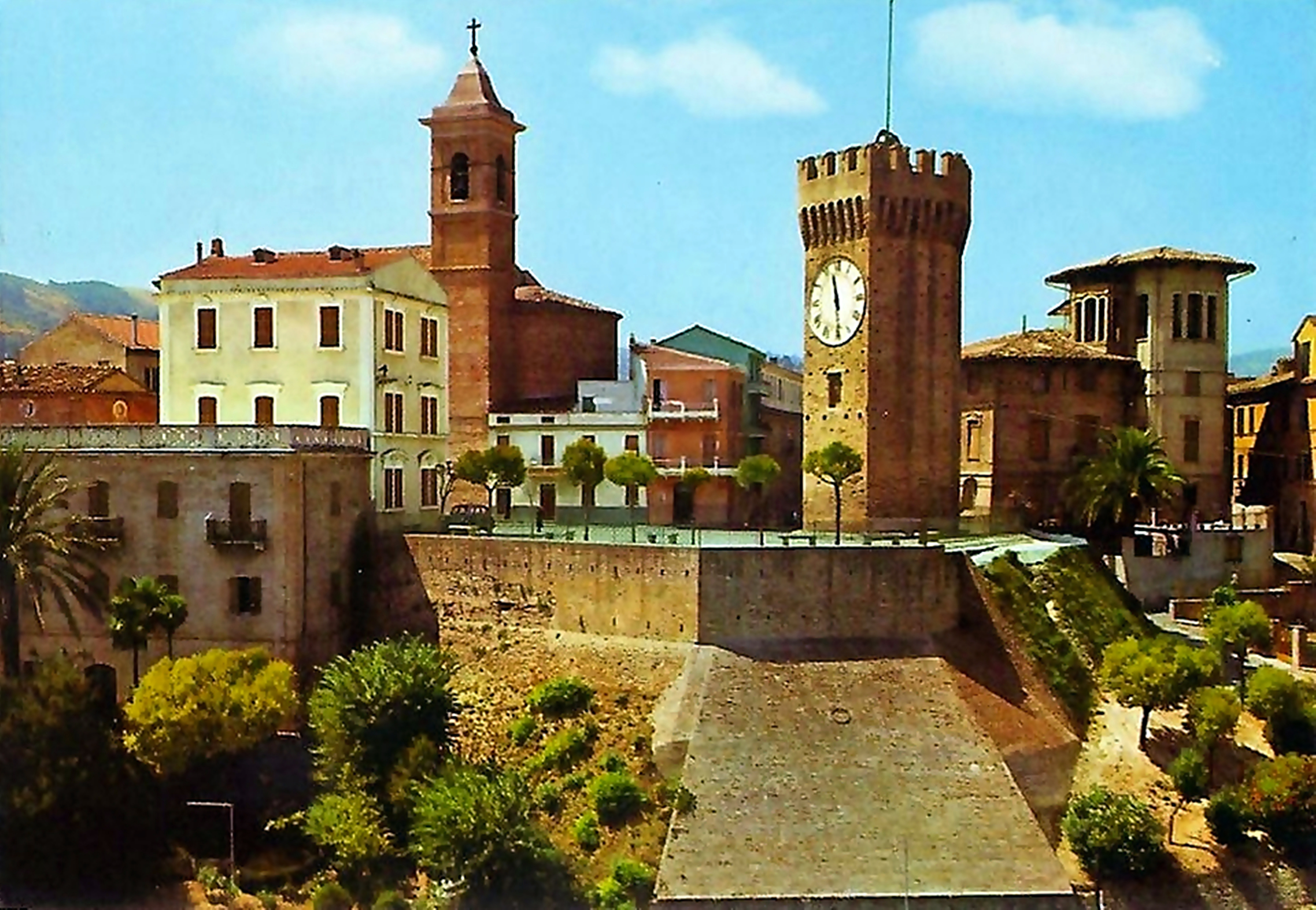
- Country: Italy
- Region: Marche

The Upper Town of San Benedetto del Tronto is the core of the old town, is the first urban settlement of the city of San Benedetto del Tronto. Previously called Castrum Sancti Benedicti and Castello, It stands on a low hill 500 meters from the Adriatic Sea.The historic center is enclosed within the ancient castle walls, of which only a few sections remain today, enclosing what was once the ancient Castrum Sancti Benedicti. Archaeological finds document the existence of the settlement in the old hamlet since Ancient Rome, from the 1st century BC. The "Villa Marittima" is the definitive confirmation of the ancient frequentation of the San Benedetto coast. The original nucleus of the current abbey church dates back to the 4th century, when a small chapel was built over the tomb of Benedict the First Martyr, a Roman soldier beheaded in 304 during the Diocletianic persecution. Between the 4th century and 5th centuries, the area consolidated as a parish church, and the first fortified residential nucleus spontaneously arose around this devotional center called Plebs Sancti Benedicti in Albula. From 1280 to 1827, it remained under the jurisdiction of Fermo; it was an important 12th century border stronghold that defended the territories of the March of Fermo.

== History and features ==
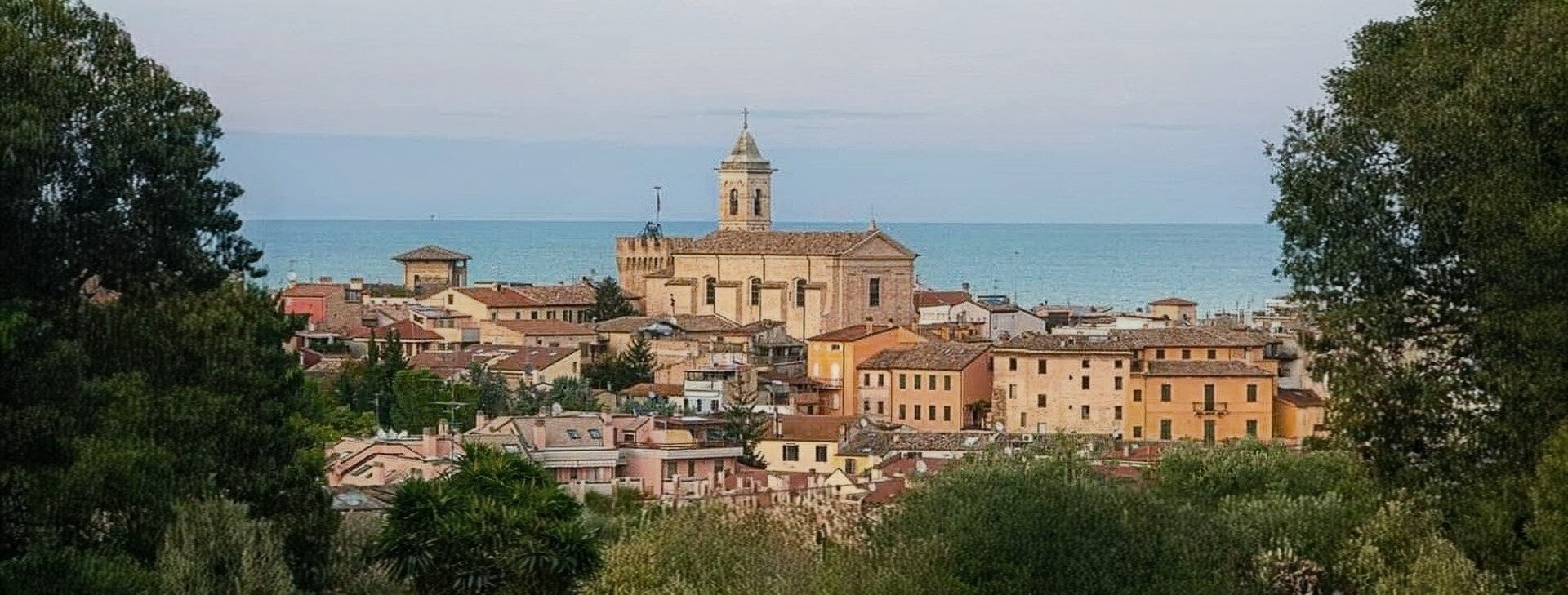
Panorama view of the Upper Town of San Benedetto del Tronto on the Adriatic Sea from the surrounding hills

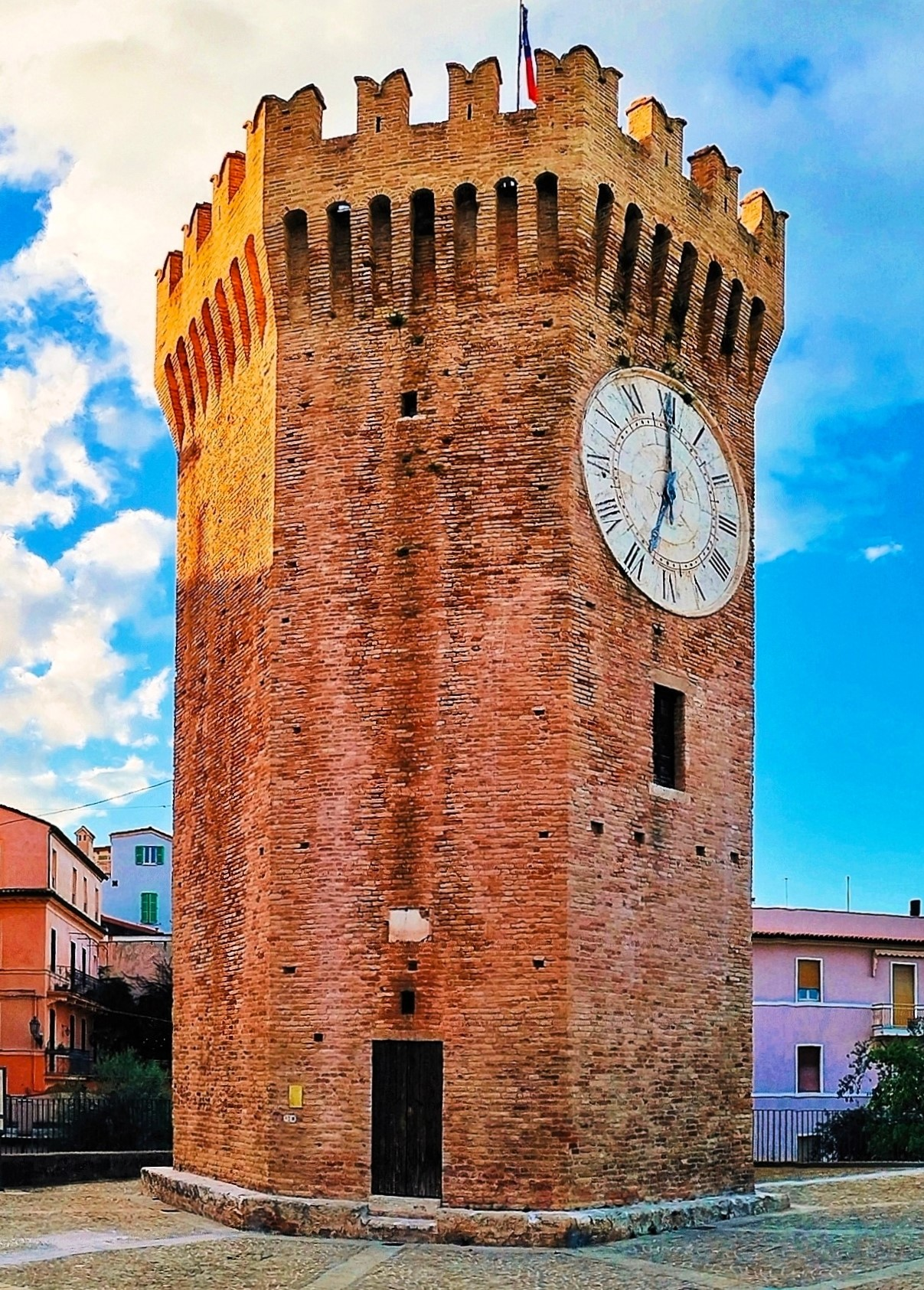
the Gualtieri Tower

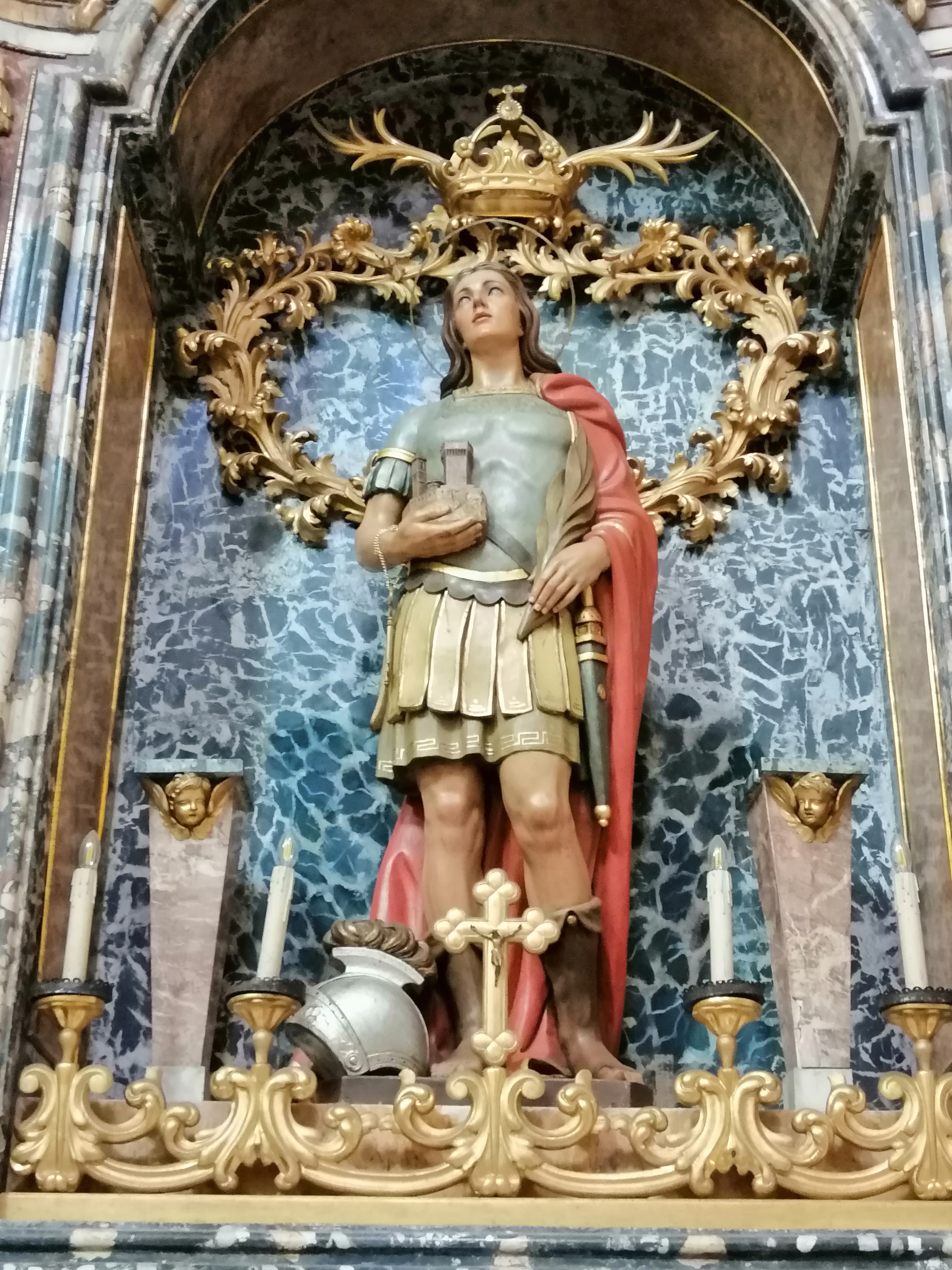
Statue of the martyr Saint Benedict

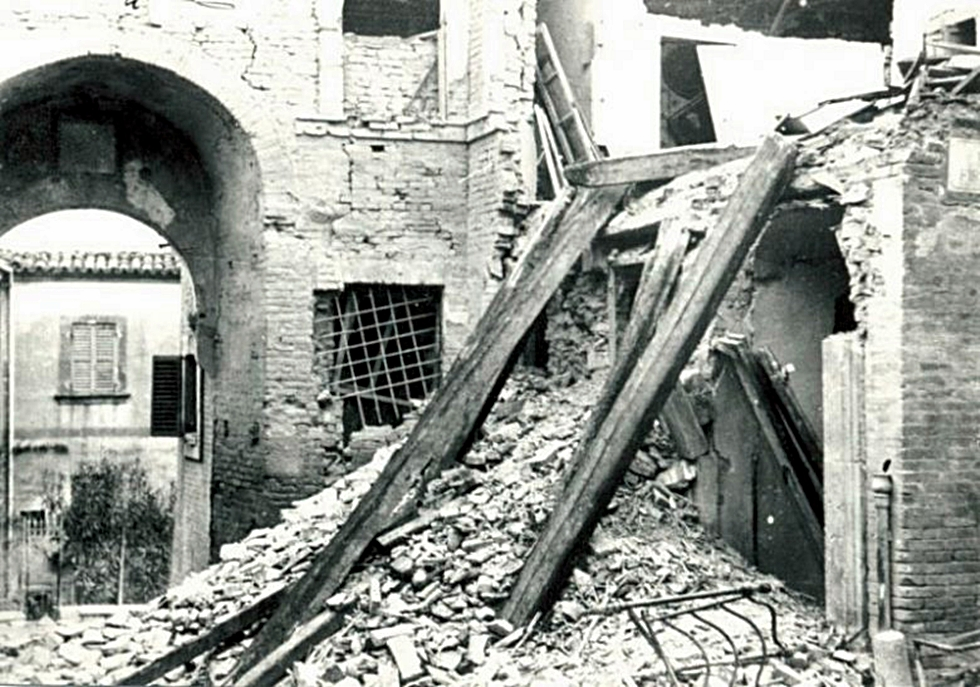
November 27, 1943, bombing and destruction of buildings in the upper part of the city by Allied forces

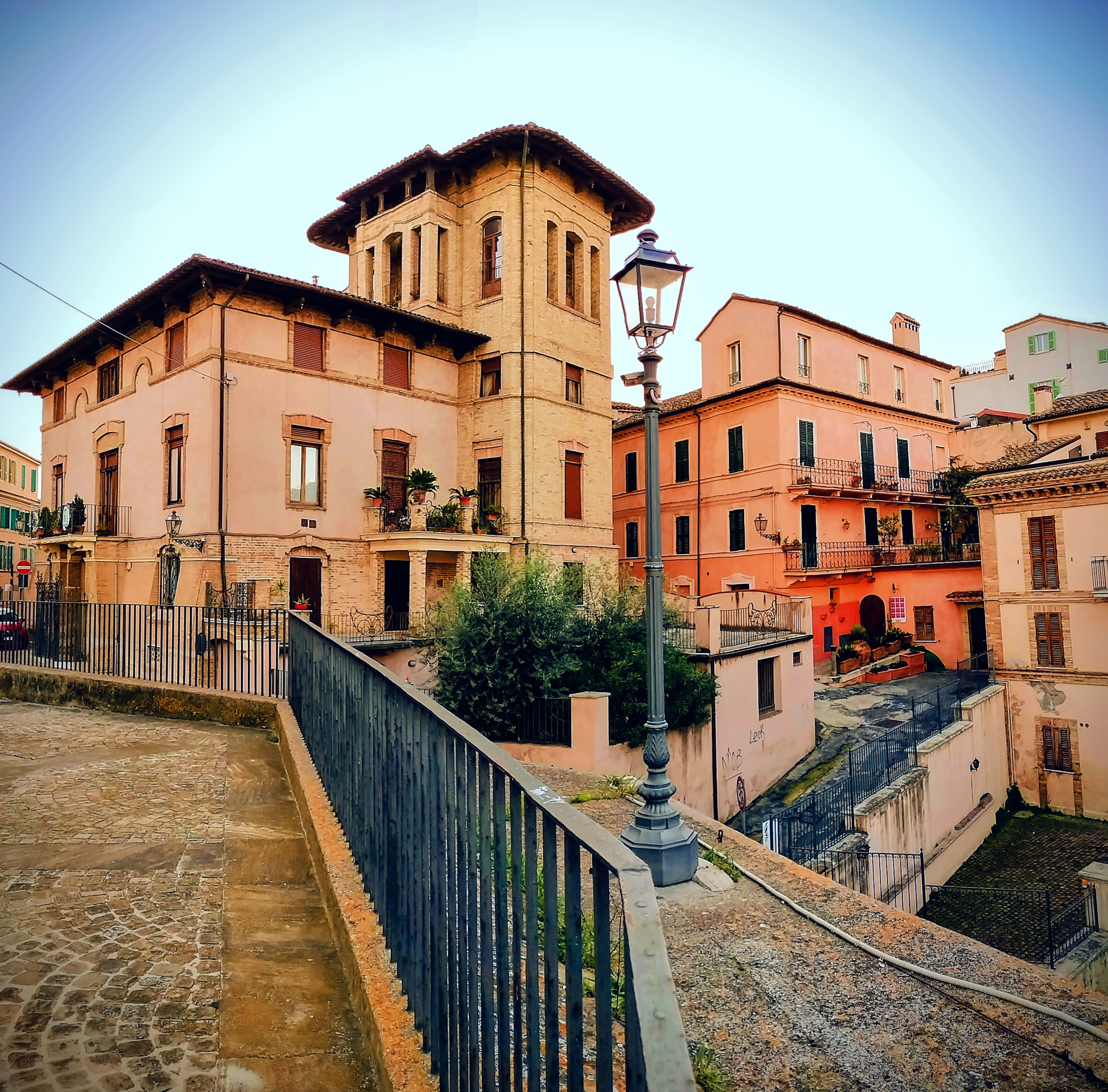
Glimpse of the ancient house in the Upper Town

Archaeological excavations have confirmed that the first settlements date back to the 1st century BC. The discovery of the remains of a Roman villa, called Villa Marittima, marks a period when the San Benedetto coastline was active and populated by ancient Roman colonies. The villa stands a few meters from the Church of San Benedetto Martire, the church built on the ancient tomb of the Martyr. A first place of worship was built on the shrine, where the relics of Saint Benedict were preserved in the 4th century. The building was then rebuilt in the 12th century, when the ancient medieval village, Castrum Sancti Benedicti, was built around the church.

In 1145, the Gualtieri family, originally from the Kingdom of Naples, obtained a plot of land from Bishop Liberto of Fermo, necessary to build a castle on the hill where the parish church of San Benedetto Martire stands. Between the 12th and 13th centuries, the Gualtieri Tower was built, serving as a command and defense post for the then-castle.

In 1491, the people of Fermo approached Pope Innocent VIII for permission to destroy the castle of San Benedetto due to its unhealthy air, and rebuild it in a healthier location. There was a step back. The castle was left untouched; the pope authorized the people of San Benedetto to expand it. In 1571, Fermo granted permission to open the castle gates, and people began to populate and build along the beach. During that period, too, Turkish landings continued. Despite these years of fear, apprehension, and terror, the people of San Benedetto did not lose courage and continued their expansion along the beach.

On November 27, 1943, the village of Alto was severely hit by Allied bombing during World War II; many houses and buildings were destroyed by the violence of the bombs, and over 25 civilian victims and an unknown number of occupying German soldiers were recorded.

== Landmarks and places of interest ==
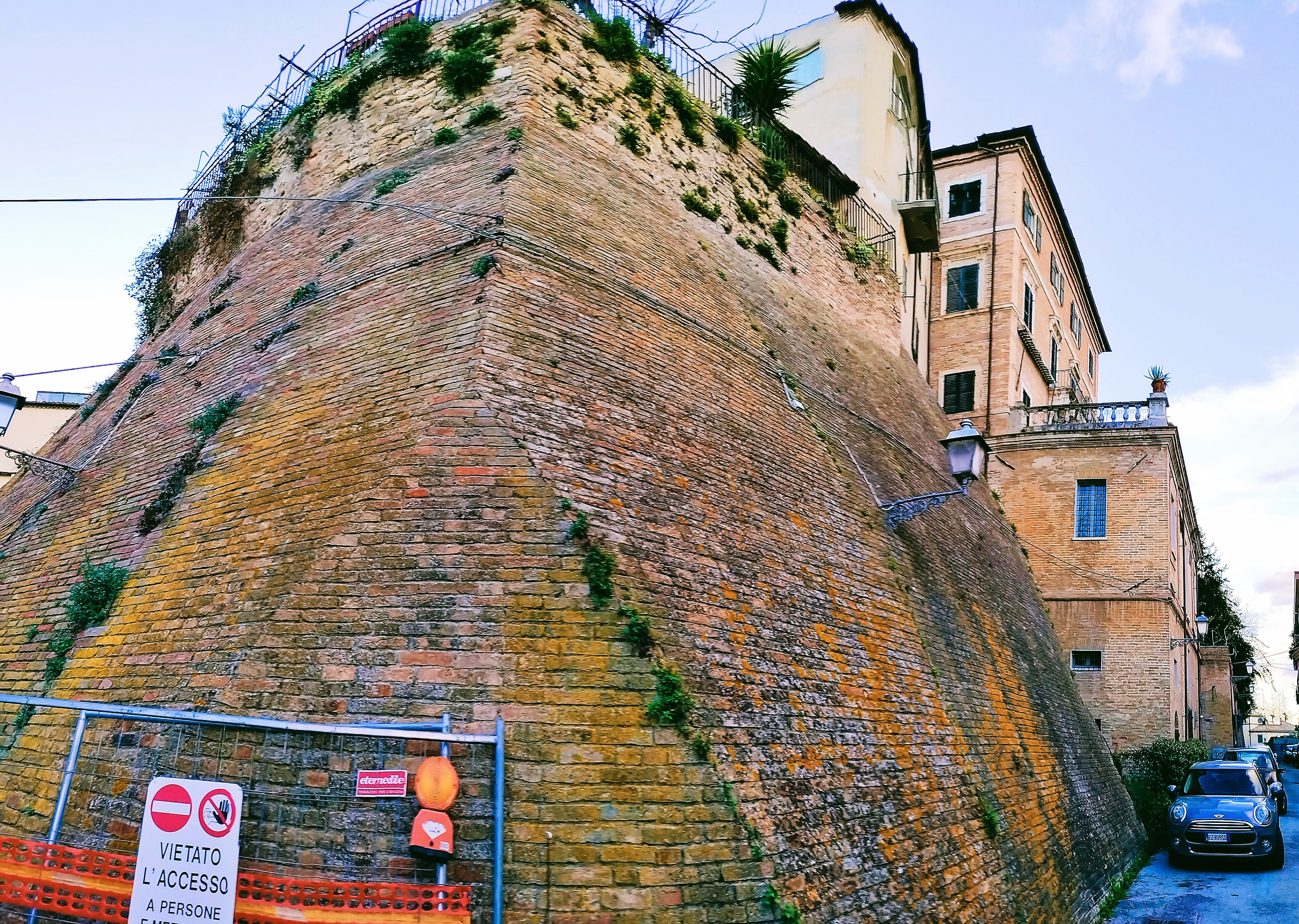
View of the remains of the castle walls

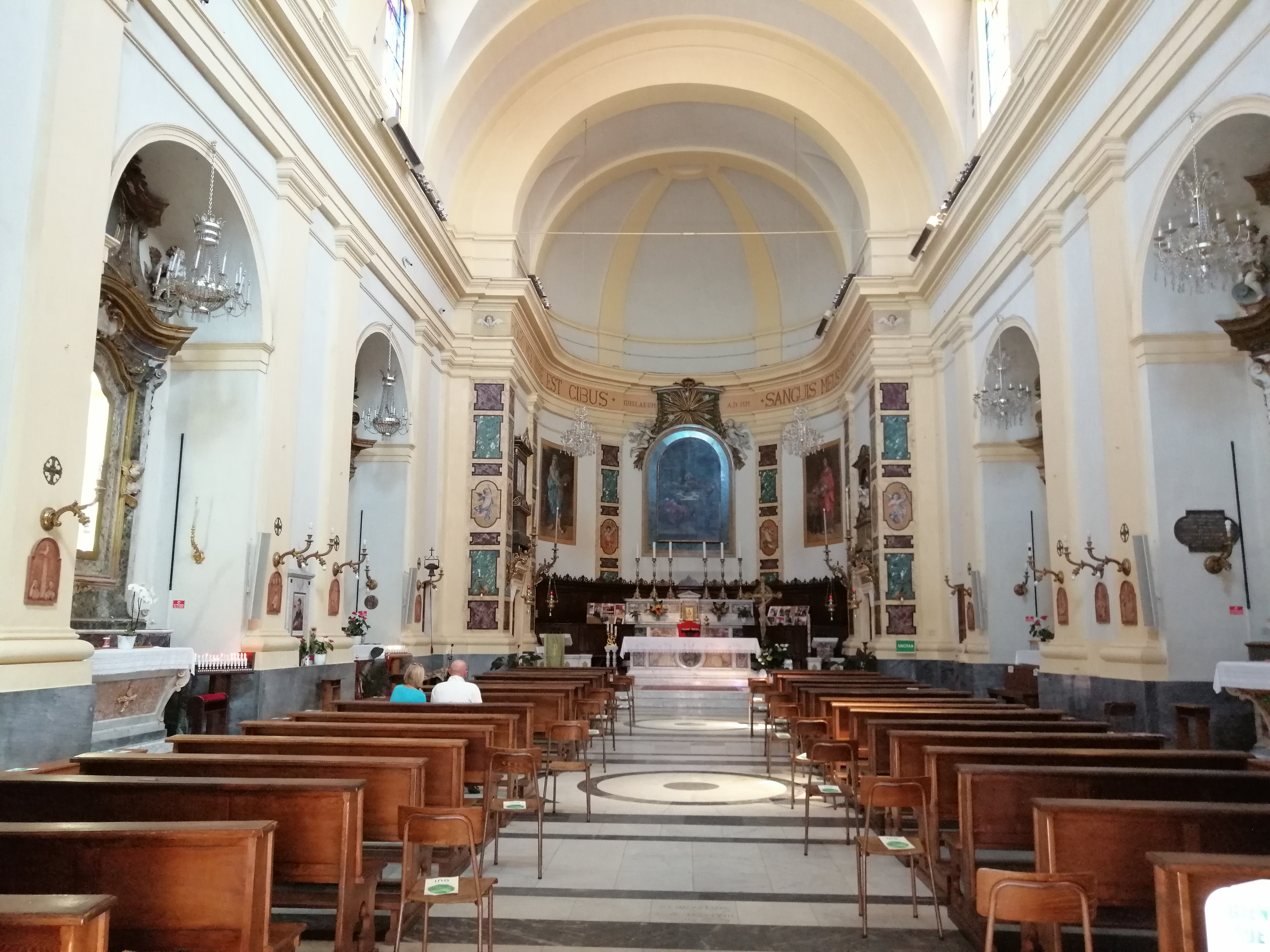
Church of San Benedetto Martire the interior of the church

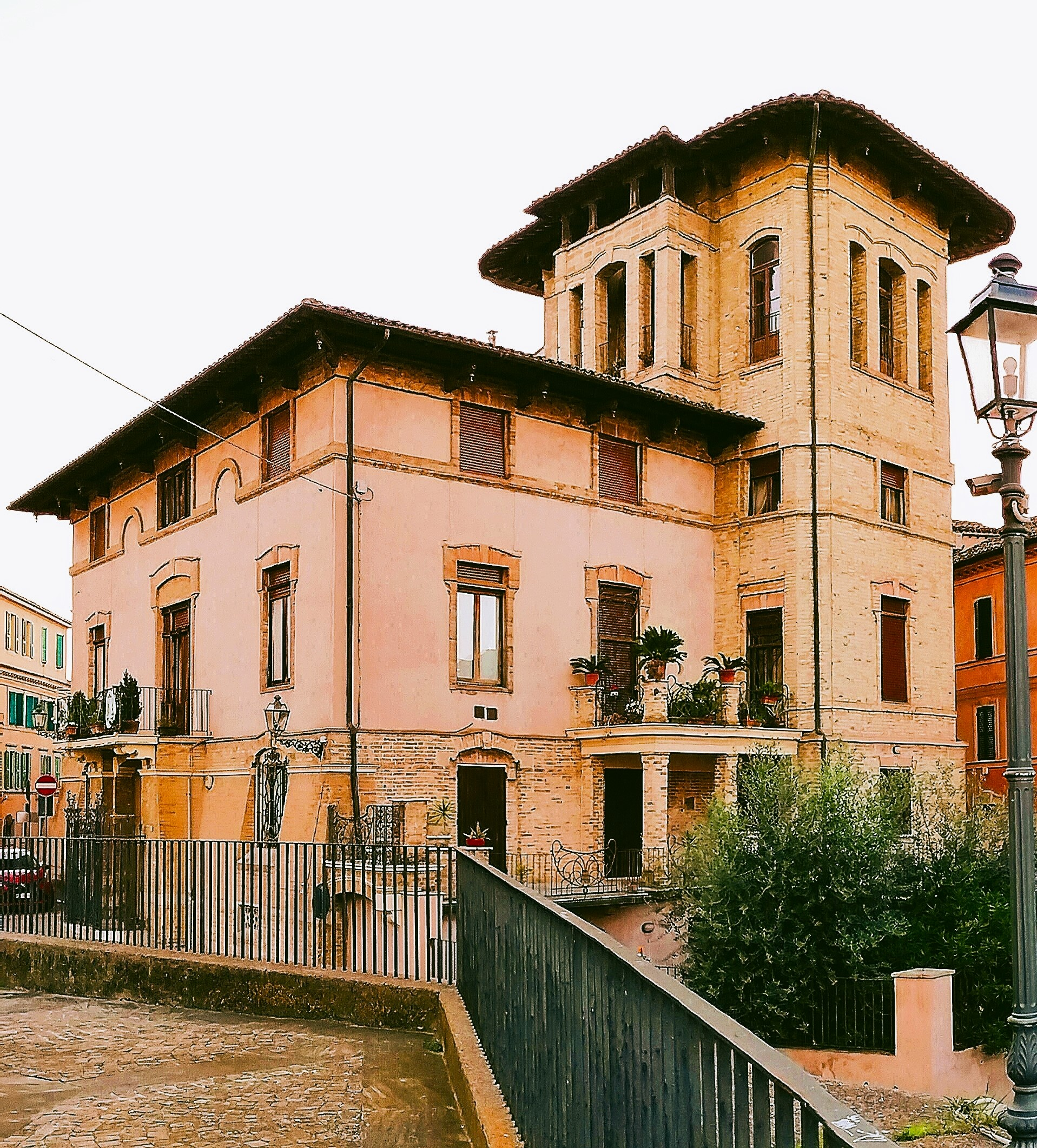
The Anelli building

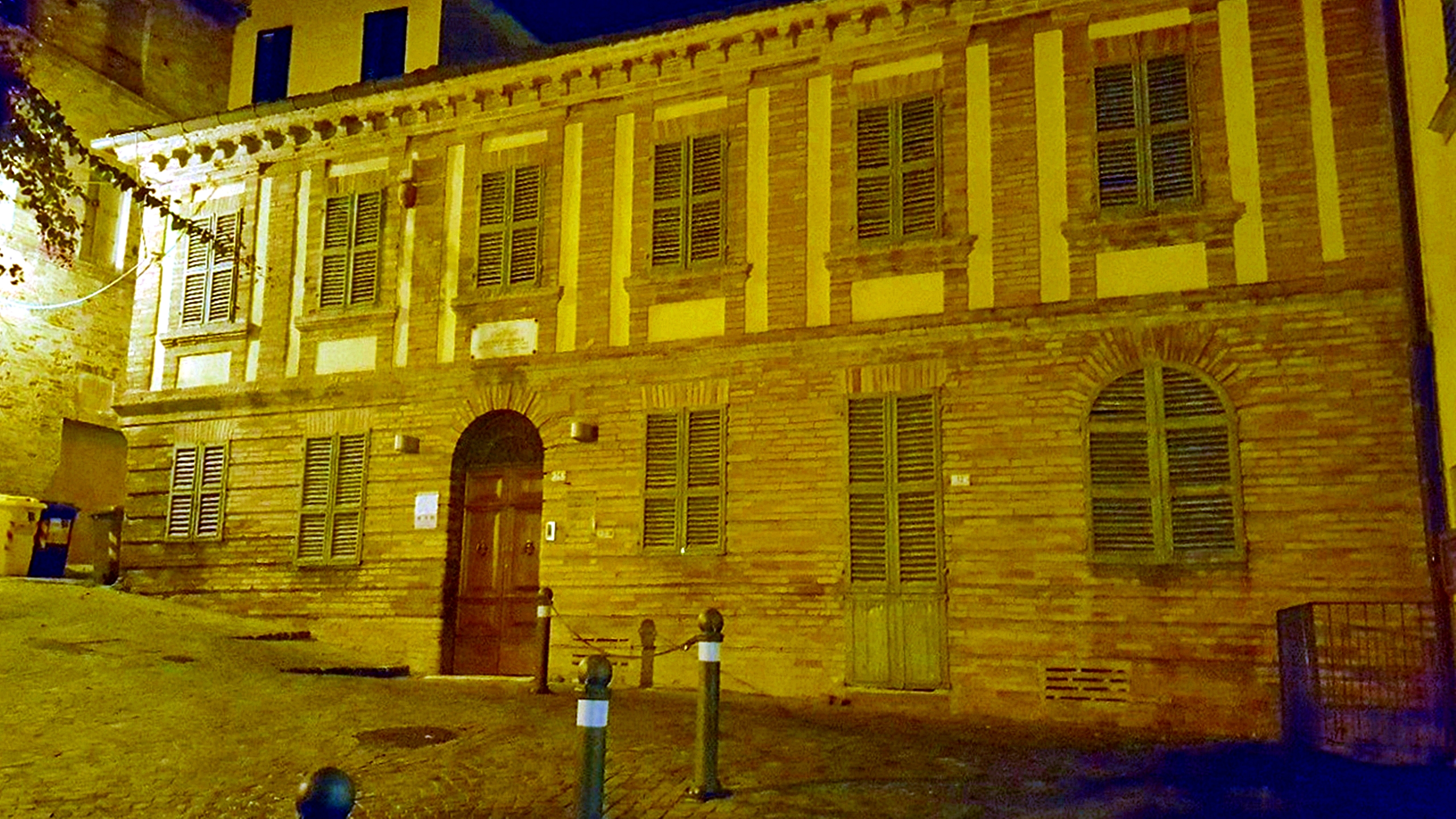
The Piacentini building

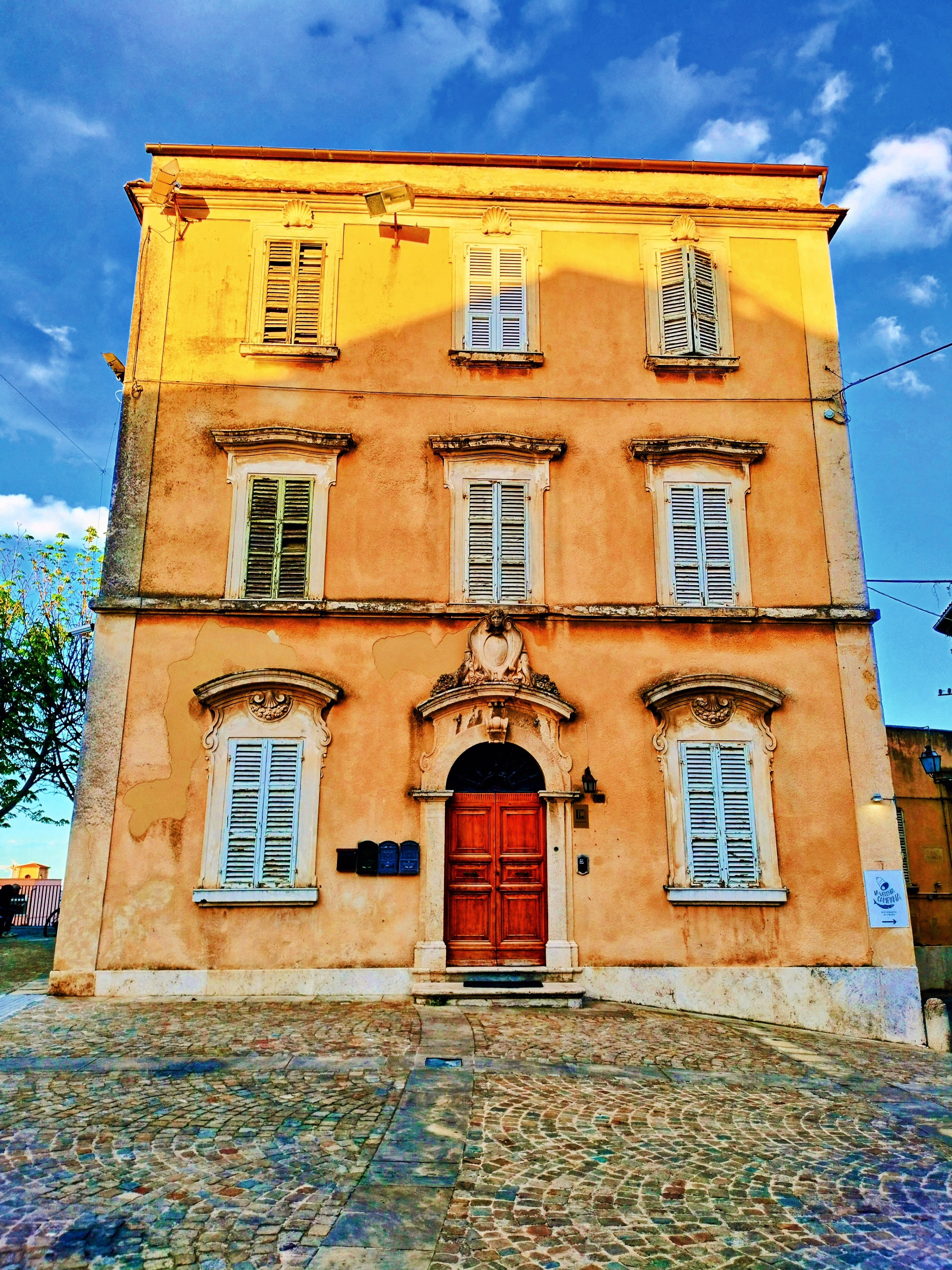
The Husson da Camera building

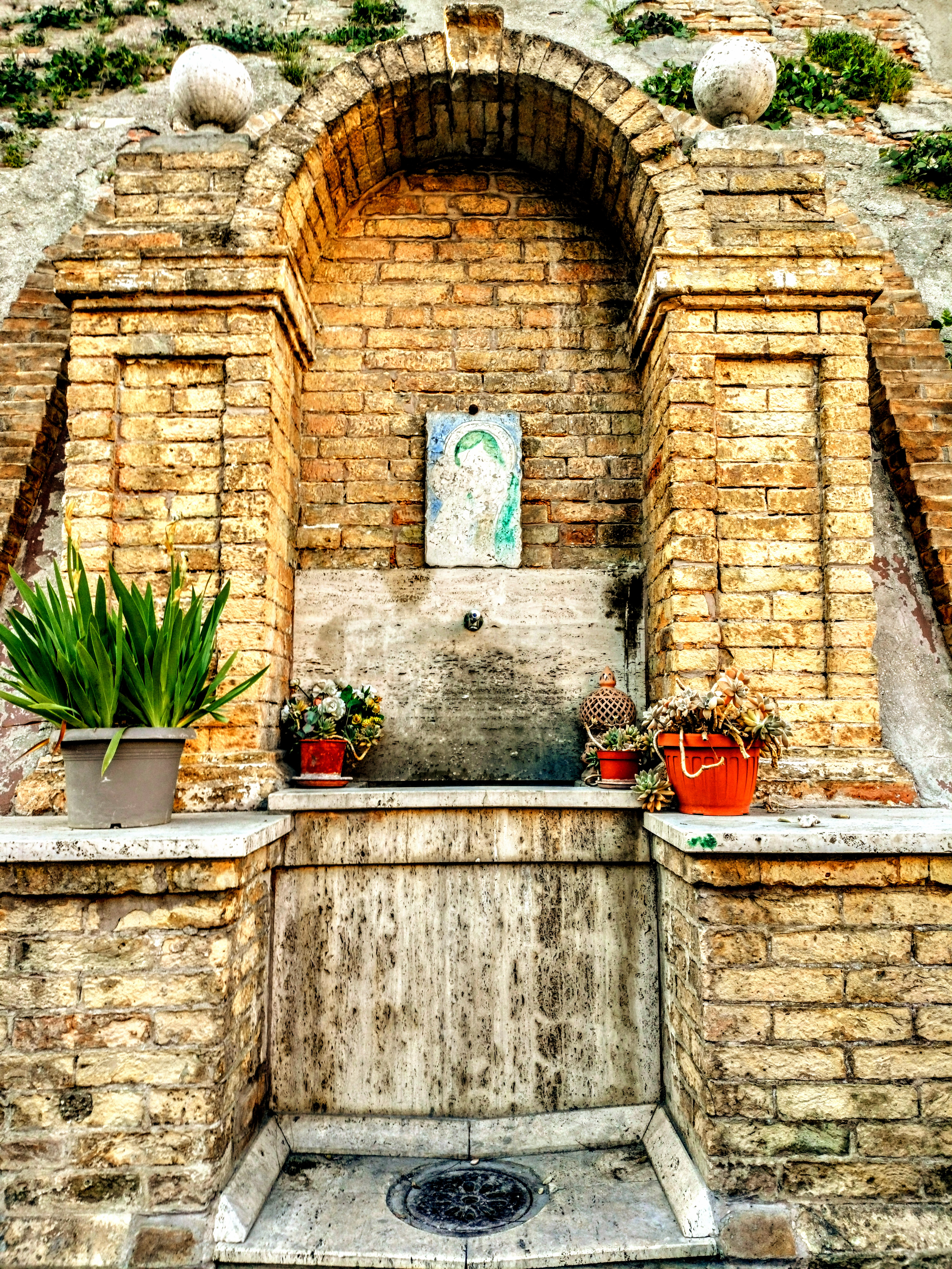
The Monumental fountain from the 18th century

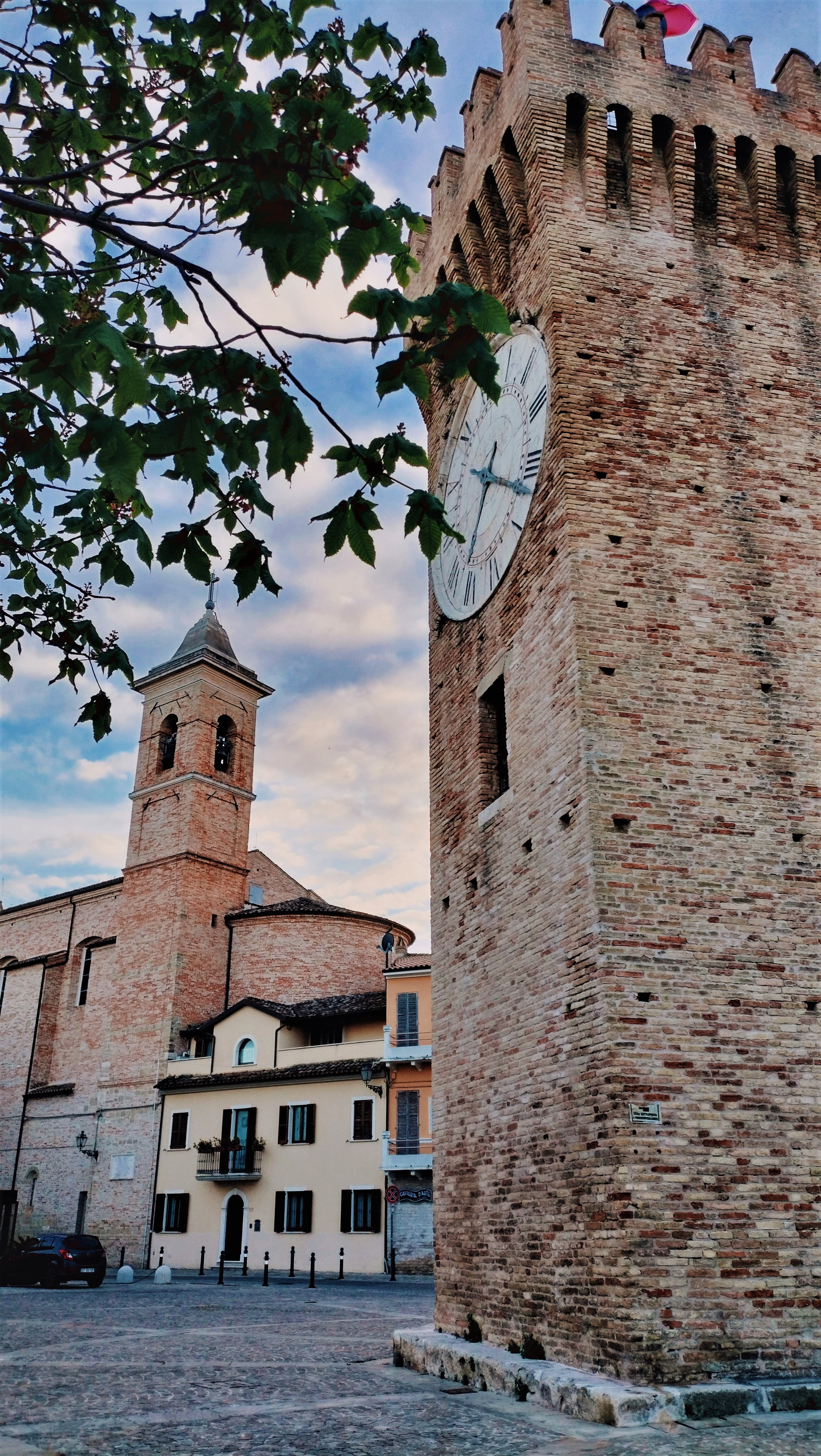
View of the Torre dei Gualtieri with the abbey church of San Benedetto Martire in the background

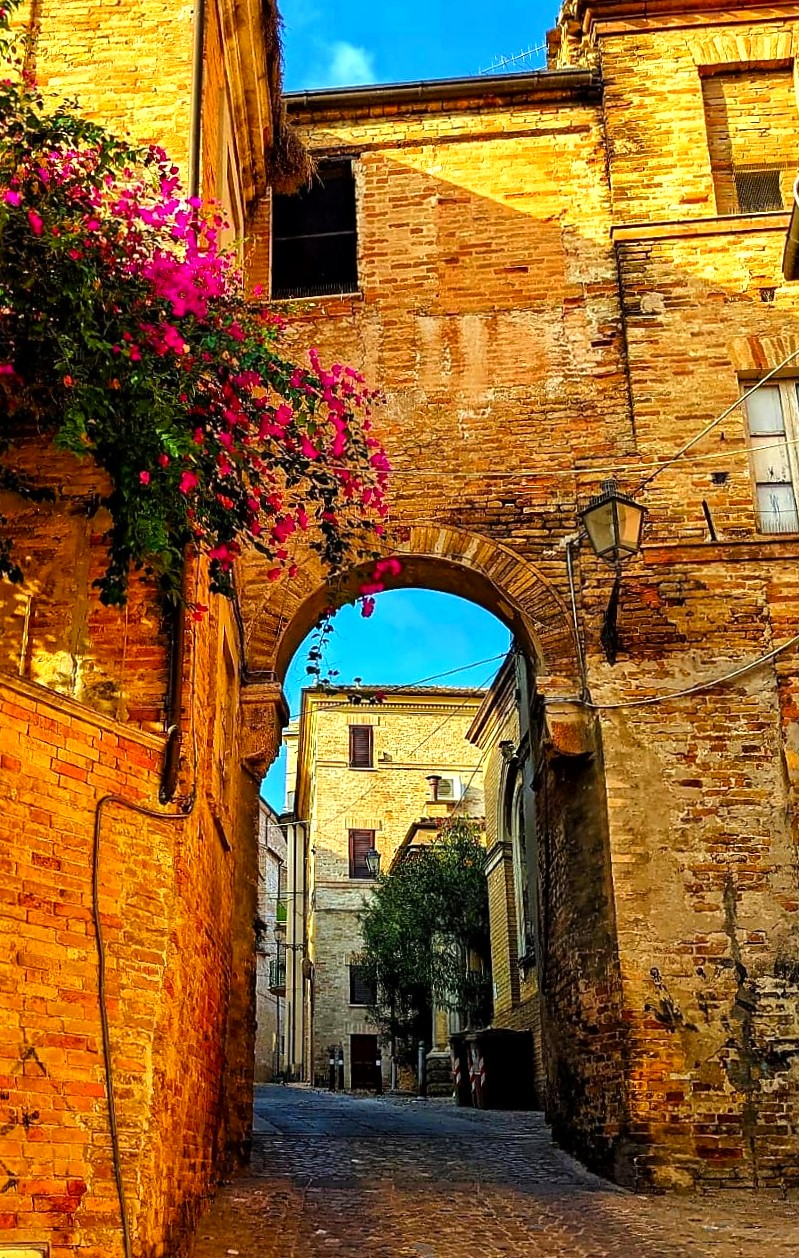
The Sea Gate

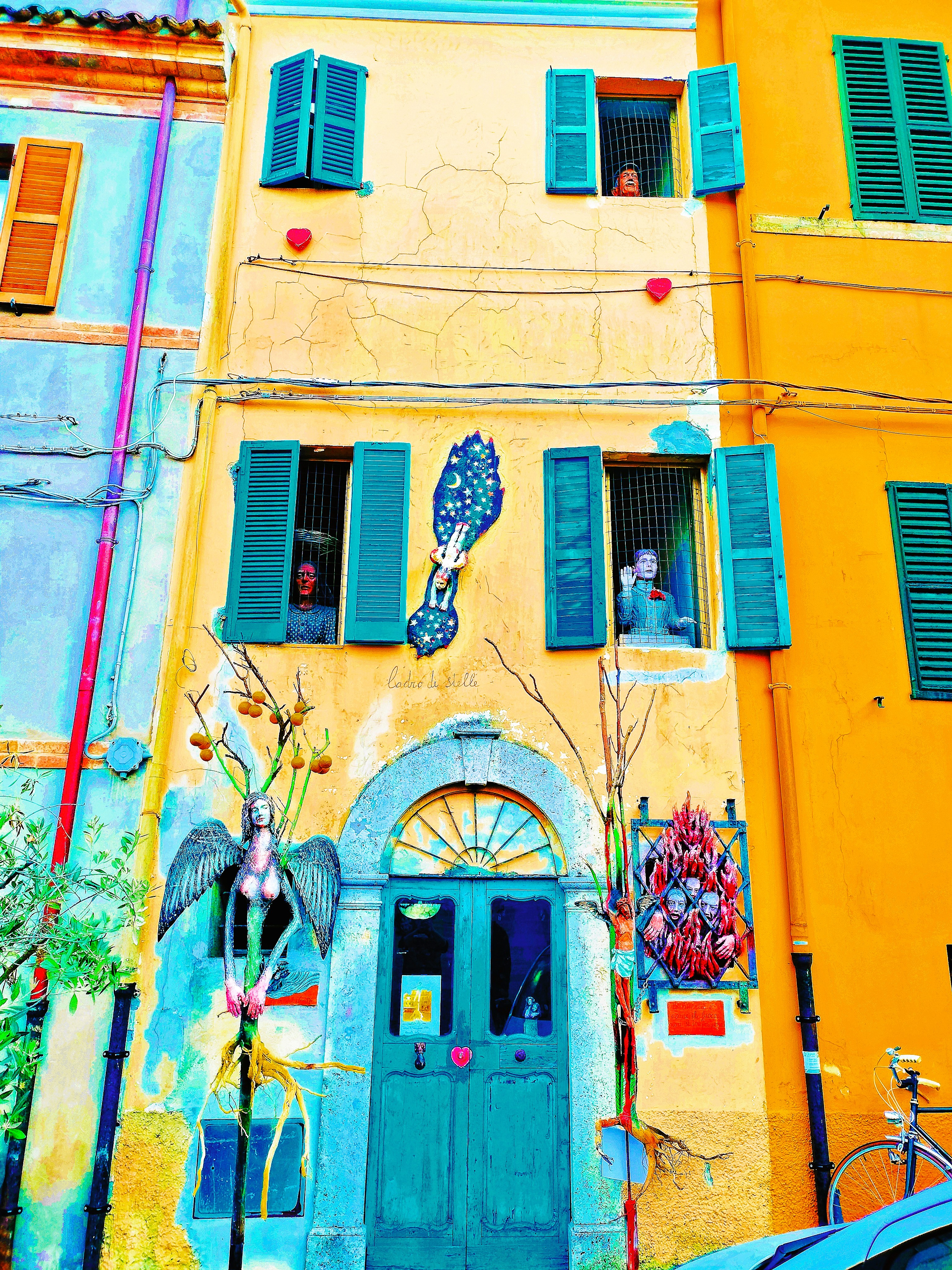
The houses of the wind

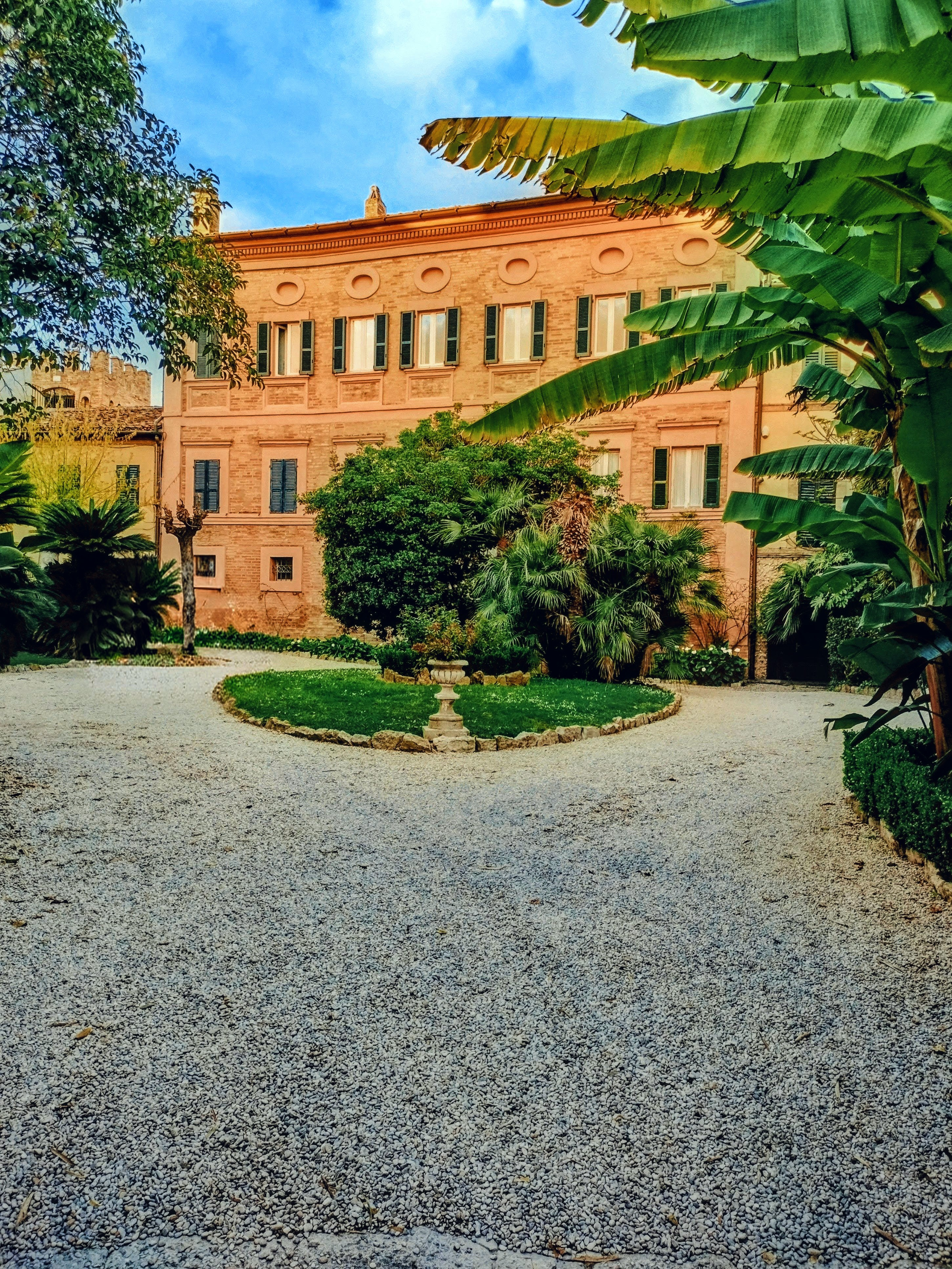
Villa Guidi

- Castle Walls - In addition to the fortress tower, there remain remains of the castle walls of the fortification that extended around the old town, as well as two gates, which have undergone renovations and transformations over the centuries. The main gate retains masonry features that indicate a pre-existing drawbridge. The old gate was remodeled in the 17th century. During excavation work for its construction, a brick bearing the date 1691 was found. It was part of an arch of the endless tunnels that branch out beneath the castle and into the old town of the Upper Town. It encloses the medieval core of the city, with a perimeter of approximately 500 meters.
- Church of San Benedetto Martire - The church of the city's patron saint, located in the center of the medieval village, was small and is the city's oldest religious building, dating back to the 4th century.
- the Gualtieri Tower - The tower stands in Piazza Giuseppe Sacconi, a few meters from the Abbey of San Benedetto Martire, Palazzo Anelli, the episcopal seat of the diocese of San Benedetto del Tronto-Ripatransone-Montalto, and Villa Marittima. It is the symbol and historical and cultural reference point for the community and hosts exhibitions and cultural initiatives. From the terrace at the top, you can enjoy a 360° view of the surrounding area, which includes, among other things, the entire city of San Benedetto del Tronto, the Adriatic Sea, and the hills. The tower is open to tourists.
- Palazzo Anelli - The construction of the building dates back to February 1730, owned by the Anelli family. Located near the Torre dei Gualtieri, the structure features Art Nouveau elements, in 1920 the Art Nouveau turret was built, in 1930 a sloping wall was built around the building to a height of about one metre. During the bombing of 27 November 1943 it was badly damaged and a large part of it was demolished. Since 1992 the building has been restored and refurbished to make it functional to host the episcopal seat.
- Palazzo Piacentini - formerly Casa Fiorani of 1812, was built by Giuseppe Fiorani, a master carpenter from Ripatransone. It was the home of poet Bice Piacentini and is now a place dedicated to culture: it houses the Municipal Historical Archives, the Pinacoteca del Mare, Bice's Studio, and an art gallery.
- Palazzo Husson - located in Piazza Giuseppe Sacconi is a stately building from 1873, it was owned by the commander Husson Giorgio Augusto.
- Palazzo Neroni Cancelli - is a stately home and owes its name to Giuseppe Neroni Cancelli. On January 24, 1849, Giuseppe Garibaldi.
- Villa Guidi - built in the second half of the 18th century; the garden of the Marquis Guidi's villa is of particular interest. The Guidi family, after purchasing several surrounding farmhouses, had them demolished to restore and beautify the lateral areas of the palace and create an elegant garden. They also closed Via Firenze, near Porta da Mare, which passed directly in front of their villa.
- Villa Mancini Guidi - located north of the ancient residence. The most notable architectural detail is the monumental 19th-century entrance, today known as "the climb of the lions" due to the presence of two sculptures depicting lions at the entrance.
- The Sea Gate - formerly "Porta Marina" or "Porta Vecchia," owes its name to the passage that connected the ancient village with the maritime area. Located where the ancient Via del Castello joins Via del Consolato, it features a 16th-century round arch, built into the section of wall in which it was originally located. Next to the arch, on the right, is Palazzo Piacentini, home of the dialect poet Bice Piacentini.
- Ancient Gate of the Castle - This small ancient gate, located not far from Piazza Dante, was once an important access point between the ancient village of Paese Alto to the north.
- The 18th-century fountain - nestled among the remains of the castle walls, features a structure dating back to the 18th century. It is entirely made of brick and features two molded pillars, surmounted by a small barrel vault. It is located between Via del Consolato and Via Elio Fileni, in the medieval village of Paese Alto.
- Giuseppe Sacconi square - formerly Piazza del Belvedere, dedicated to the architect Giuseppe Sacconi, who dedicated himself to the restoration of the Torre dei Gualtieri in the early years of the 20th century, it is one of the most important squares in the old town centre of San Benedetto del Tronto; nicknamed by the people of San Benedetto "La rocca".
- Bice Piacentini square - Dedicated to the poet Bice Piacentini, it now hosts concerts and cultural events.

=== Museums ===
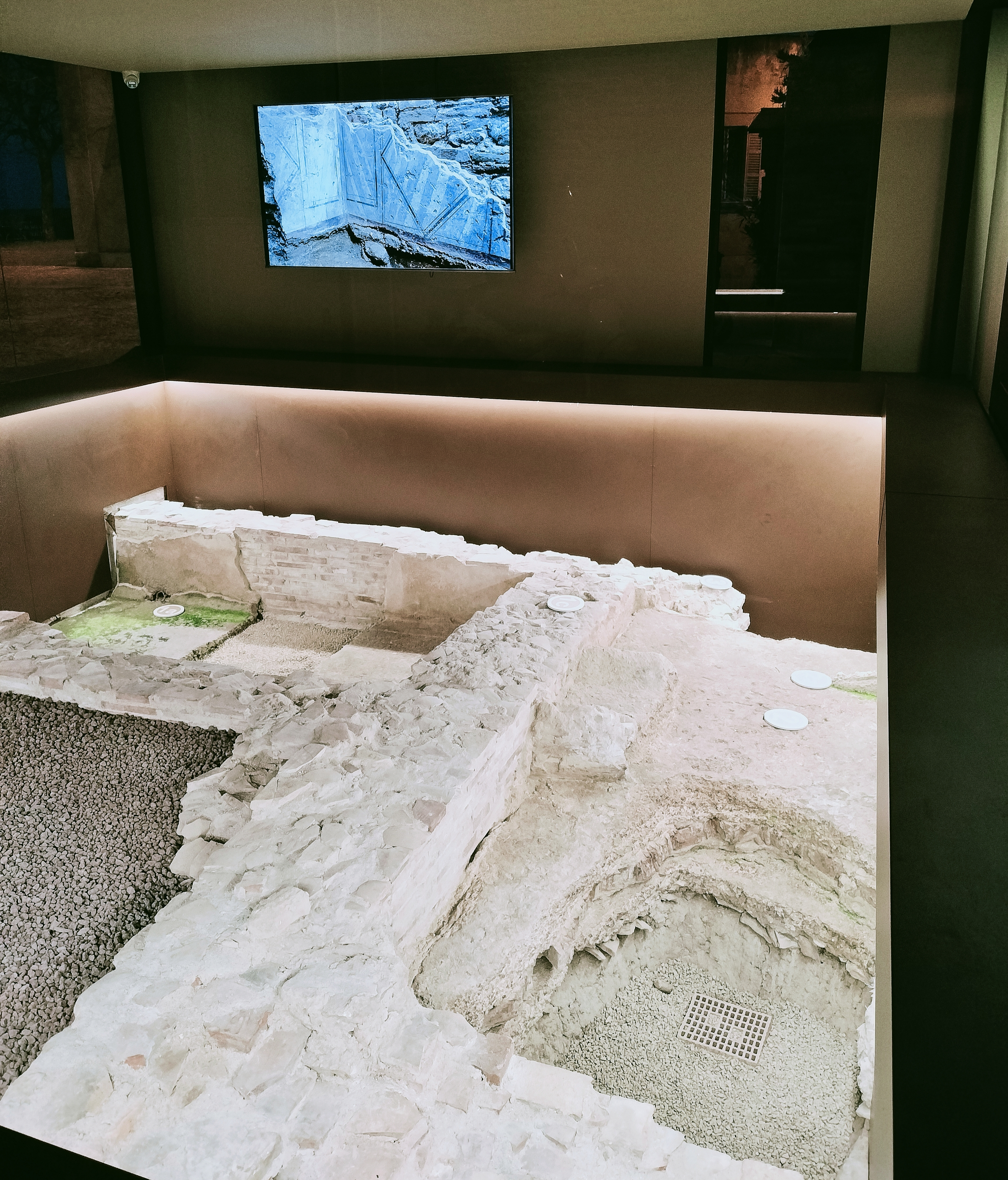
View of the remains of Villa Marittima

- Maritime Villa - located in Giuseppe Sacconi square, the remains of a Roman villa from the 1st century BC are located. Excavations have uncovered portions of mosaic floors and some colorfully plastered walls, as well as rustic floors and vats for processing Garum, and red wall frescoes typical of the Roman decorative phase dating back to the Neronian or Flavian era.
- The Museum of Maritime Civilization of the Marche - is part of the "Museo del Mare" museum complex, thanks to the exhibition itineraries that make up the Polo Museale del Mare, this museum has the privilege of representing, in addition to the local one, the maritime civilization of the entire region Marche.
- The Pinacoteca del Mare - inaugurated in 2009 in Palazzo Bice Piacentini, is an integral part of the thematic museum complex dedicated to the sea. It houses works (paintings and photographs) by various artists, including Adolfo de Carolis.
- House of the Wind - a 17th century building owned by the sculptor Marcello Sgattoni, has two facades: one on Via del Consolato and the other on Piazza Bice Piacentini. It is a small art studio that houses the sculptor's works.

=== Squares ===
- Giuseppe Sacconi Square;
- Bice Piacentini Square;
- Dante Alighieri Square.
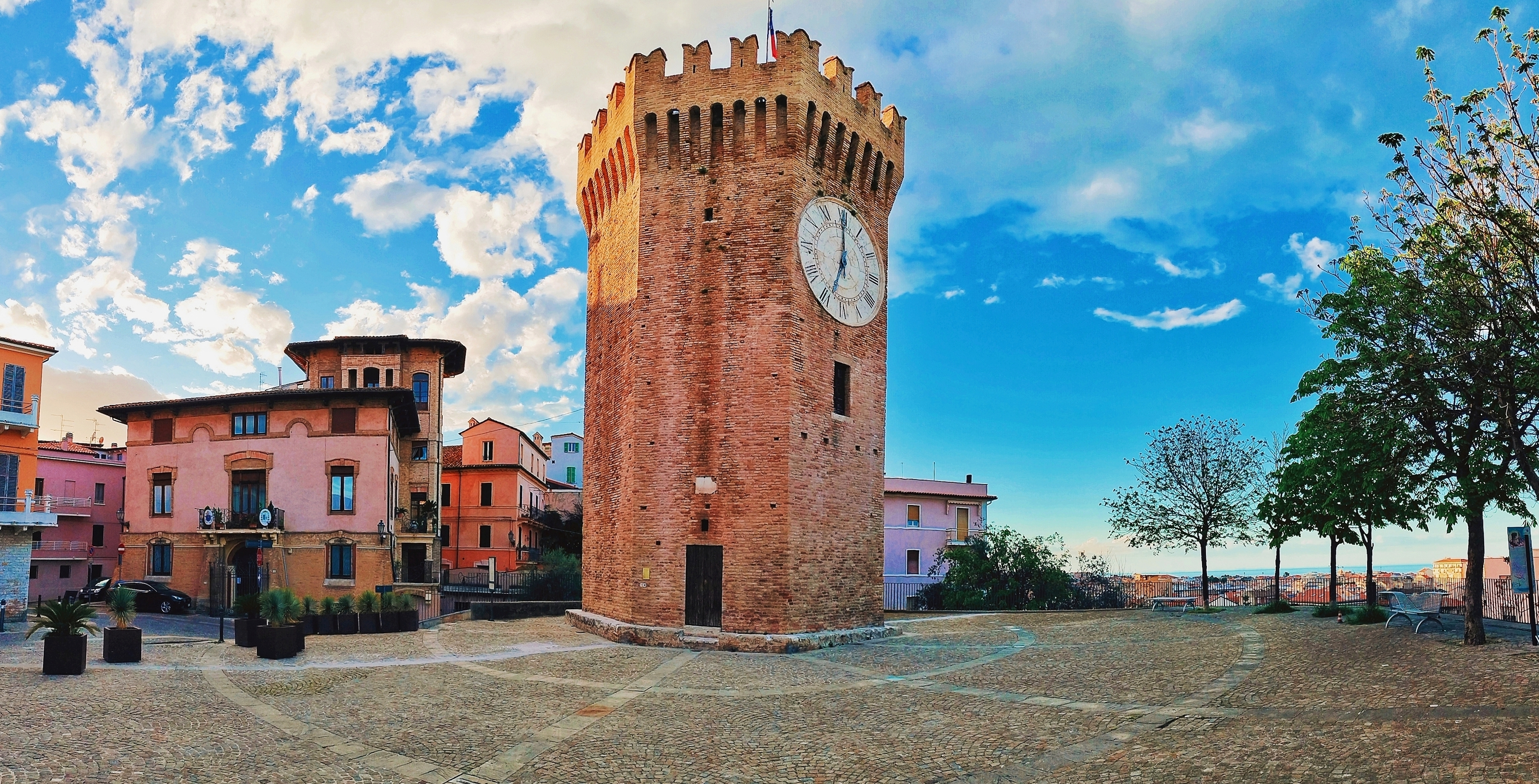
The Giuseppe Sacconi square

== See also ==
- San Benedetto del Tronto

== Bibliography ==
- Enrico Liburdi, Per una storia San Benedetto del Tronto, Maroni Editore , 1988, ISBN 202-10-3025-314-1
