= Mogliano =

- Comune
- Comune di Mogliano
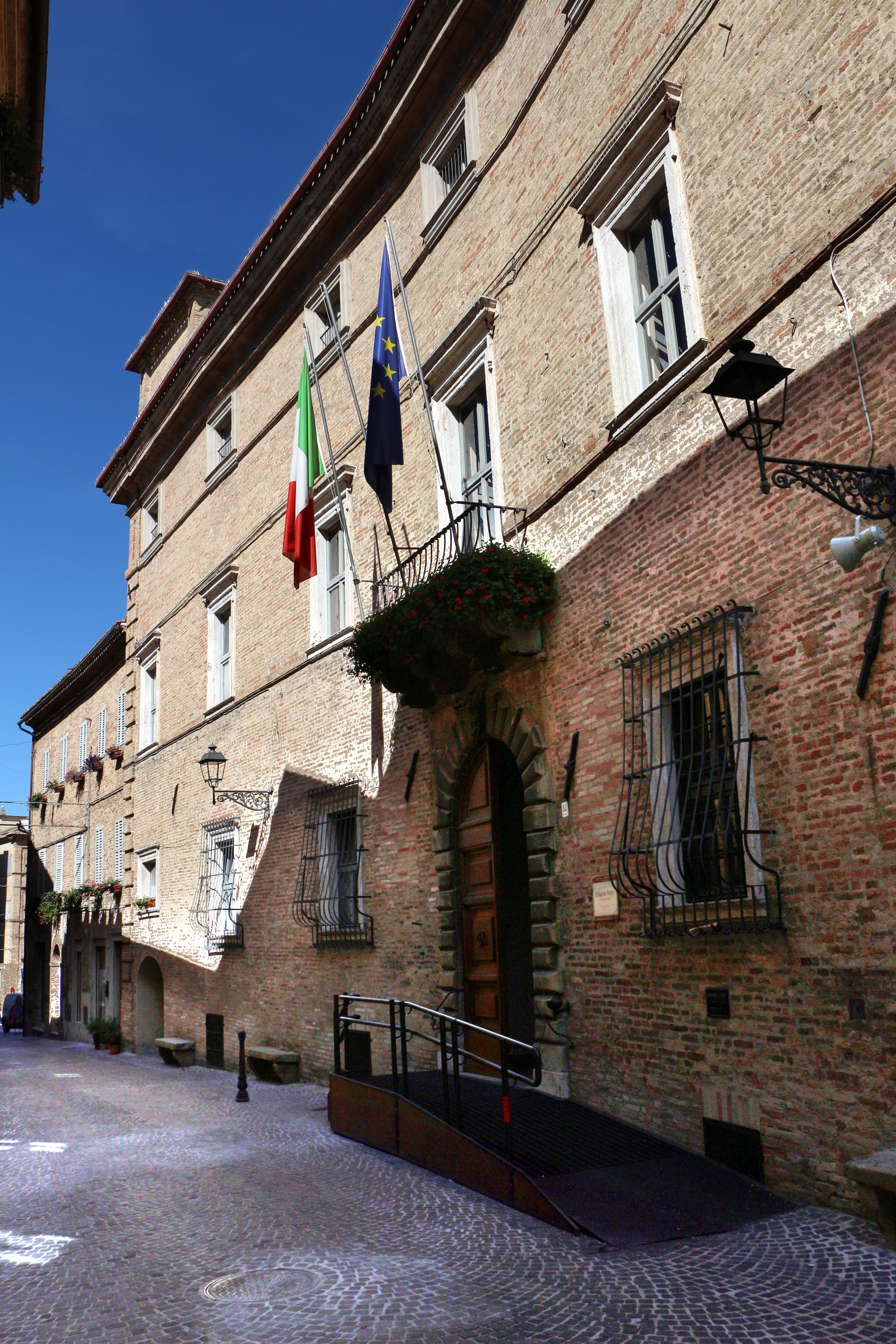

- Coat of arms

- Location within Italy Location within Marche
- Coordinates: 43°11′N 13°29′E
- Country: Italy
- Region: Marche
- Province: Macerata (MC)

Government
  - Mayor: Cecilia Cesetti

Area
  - Total: 29.3 km^{2} (11.3 sq mi)
- Elevation: 313 m (1,027 ft)

Population (31 December 2017)
  - Total: 4,576
  - Density: 156/km^{2} (404/sq mi)
- Demonym: Moglianesi
- Time zone: UTC+1 (CET)
  - Summer (DST): UTC+2 (CEST)
- Postal code: 62010
- Dialing code: 0733
- Patron saint: St. John the Baptist
- Saint day: June 24
- Website: Official website

Mogliano is a comune (municipality) in the Province of Macerata in the Italian region Marche, located about 50 kilometres (31 mi) south of Ancona and about 13 kilometres (8 mi) south of Macerata.

Mogliano rises on a hill at 313 m. on the sea level and halfway between the Sibillini mountains and the Adriatic coast. The village is known for the craftsmanship of wicker used for the production of: baskets and furniture.

== History ==
The current territory of Mogliano was inhabited in 7th and 6th centuries BC by the Piceni, as testified by the discovery of a sandstone stele with an inscription kept in the National Museum in Ancona. These people lived in villages scattered along the line of local hills; their civilization was later absorbed by the Romans, when they submitted the Piceno in the first decades of the 3rd century BC.

Since the end of the 12th century to the mid-14th century, the castle was dominated by the da Mogliano family; in 1345 Gentile da Mogliano became lord of Fermo and ruled the city until 1355, when he was defeated by Cardinal Albornoz. The latter included Mogliano in the district of Fermo within the Papal States, of which it was one of the most important castles; in 1569 Mogliano became autonomous under Pope Pius V, but in 1578 it was returned under the district of Fermo.

After Italy was conquered by the French during the French Revolutionary Wars, Mogliano was included in the Department of Tronto; in 1815, with the restoration of the Papal rule, it was returned under the Delegation of Fermo, and finally, in 1828, it joined the Delegation of Macerata.

After the annexation of the Marche to the Kingdom of Italy and the division of the Marche into four provinces, Mogliano was included in the province of Macerata.

== Main sights ==
- Santa Maria in Piazza. Church-oratory houses an altarpiece by Lorenzo Lotto, The Madonna in Glory with Saints John the Baptist, Anthony of Padua, Mary Magdalene and Joseph.
- San Gregorio Magno church
- SS. Crocifisso d´Ete. The church is located at the crossroads for Montegiorgio and Francavilla d’Ete, lapped by the river Ete Morto. Building started on 11 November 1579, and the first stone was placed from the Bishop of Fermo Msgr. Pinelli, who chose the location.
- Sanctuary of the SS. Crocifisso. Here is venerated an image depicting Crucified Christ Rising from the Grave fresco from the late 15th century. Following a miraculous event that happened in the year 1809, the church was rebuilt in neoclassical style by G. Lucatelli.
- Monastery of San Giuseppe and church of Santi Crisogono e Benedetto
- Rocca Medioevale, a medieval fortress of which only the bastions remains. It is home to the Church of St. Mary of Suffrage, now deconsecrated.
- Palazzo Forti. Designed in the end of the 16th century as the home of the rich and noble family Forti; today is the seat of the Town Hall.
- Apollo Theater, opened in 1844. It has a horseshoe shape with thirty eight stages on three floors.
