= San Gregorio Magno, Mogliano =

Church in Mogliano, Italy

Coordinates: 43°11′07.6″N 13°28′46.2″E

San Gregorio Magno is a Roman Catholic church located in the town limits of Mogliano, province of Macerata, in the region of Marche, Italy.

== History ==
Founded in the 10th century, it originally was a church that was extra moenia, thus outside of the castle walls. Ultimately enclosed within the walls, the church was assigned to the Frati Minori Conventuali in the 13th century through the 15th century. The church has undergone numerous reconstructions: in 1399-1400, the church was rebuilt in Gothic style. But the major change started circa 1714 by Gianfilippo Carnili, when the orientation of the church was inverted from the Romanesque dogma of western façade and eastern apse, in order to accommodate a scenographic entrance from the street. This construction was completed in 1748 and resulted in the present brick façade with pilasters and a rounded tympanum, an elegant white stone portal, and preceded by an elaborate two flight, staircase with white balustrades.

The interior still retains three naves with six small chapels each with small cupolas. The stucco decoration was completed by Antonio Falconi in 1755. The church houses an altarpieces by Durante Nobili of Caldarola, a pupil of Lorenzo Lotto; and a work by Giovanni Battista Fagiani that includes an 18th-century view of Mogliano.
