= Murder of Alika Ogorchukwu =

2022 murder case in Italy

On 29 July 2022, Alika Ogorchukwu, a Nigerian street vendor in Italy, was murdered.

== Background ==
Ogorchukwu was a 39-year worker living in Civitanova Marche, in northern Italy. Originally from Nigeria, he had lived in Italy for over a decade and began working as a street vendor after a bicycle accident left him disabled and he was unable to find other work. He was married and a father.

== Incident and investigations ==
On 29 July, Ogorchukwu was assaulted in broad daylight as he was working. Over the course of the following minutes, the attacker beat Ogorchukwu to death using Ogorchukwu's crutch.

On 30 July, Filippo Claudio Giuseppe Ferlazzo, a 32-year old Italian man, was arrested on charges of having murdered Ogorchukwu and having stolen Ogorchukwu's phone. Police stated that they believe Ferlazzo attacked Ogorchukwu after he had asked Ferlazzo's girlfriend to buy a handkerchief and said that they would not be investigating racial hatred as a motivator for the attack. Ferlazzo's girlfriend later told the media that she had not felt bothered by Ogorchukwu.

== Reactions ==
The murder provoked a number of protests against racism in Italy. The Italian Anti-Racist Coordination published an open letter denouncing the use of racist imagery in media coverage of the murder and raised concerns about systemic ableism in Italy. Human Rights Watch stated that Italian police have "historically failed to respond adequately to hate crimes" and that the country "needs to reckon with the institutional racism in its laws and policies."

The murder also had an impact on the campaign for the 2022 Italian general election, due to be held in September 2022. Several commentators raised concerns about the impact that rhetoric used by far-right parties such as Lega and Brothers of Italy had on creating a climate of racism in the country. Trade unionist Aboubakar Soumahoro stated that "some political parties are legitimising fear and hatred towards those who are different. This is a serious danger that we must fight every day."

The municipal council voted in favour of a motion to assist Ogorchukwu's family in the aftermath, including covering part of the funds for the funeral.

== See also ==
- 2018 Florence shooting
- Macerata shooting
- Murder of George Floyd
