= Santa Maria in Piazza, Mogliano =

Church complex in Mogliano, Italy

Coordinates: 43°11′11″N 13°28′51″E

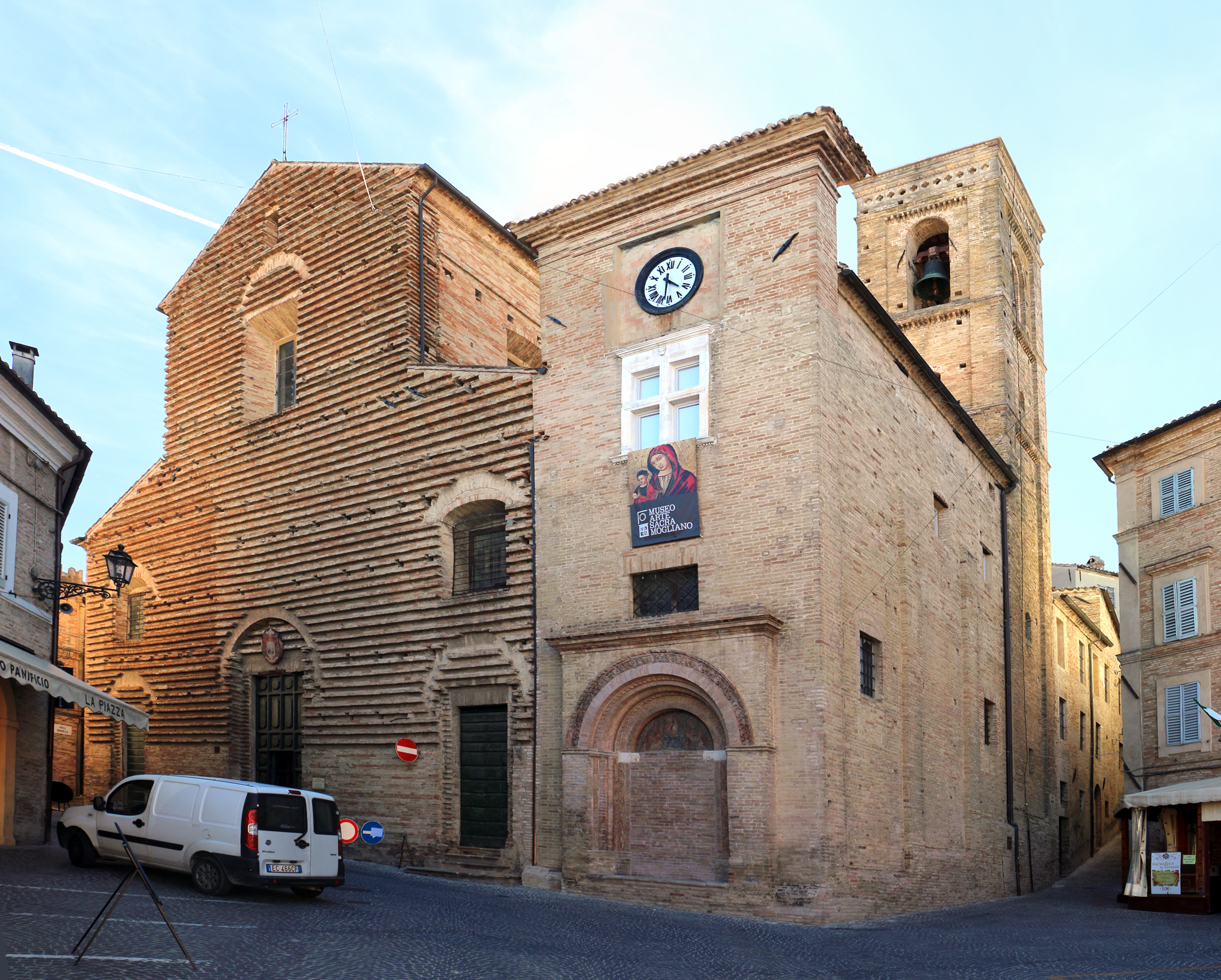

Santa Maria in Piazza, and the adjacent Oratory of the Madonna della Misericordia form a Roman Catholic church complex located on Via Roma 62, flanking Piazza Garibaldi, in the center of the town of Mogliano, province of Macerata, in the region of Marche, Italy.

== History ==
The small church was erected as an ex voto in 1420 after the ebbing of a plague epidemic. The original façade of this narrow oratory has an elegant Romanesque portal with a sculpted round arch, now sealed in brick, with a painted lunette above. The interior has a vault with crossing. This portion of the building, to the right of the larger church, is now used as the sacristy and chapel.

In 1532 -1542, the community erected a larger church with a single nave and a ceiling with wooden cassettoni. The façade is unfinished striations of brick. The present church with three naves and interior stucco decoration was completed by 1774 using designs by Giovanni Battista Rusca of Lugano. The church is best known for housing an altarpiece of the Madonna of the Assumption by Lorenzo Lotto.

The flanking altars of the church have a Pietà (1789) by Alessandro Ricci from Fermo; a Blessed Pietro di Mogliano attends to the plague-ridden fellow citizens (1786) by Giovanni Battista Fabiani from Mogliano. There is also a Madonna of the Rosary by a follower of Lotto and a Madonna of Loreto (1711) by Francesco Mariani.

The Lotto painting of the Madonna (1548) depicts Mary assumed into glory (heaven), in the upper register, while gazing upward from below are Saints Joseph, John the Baptist, Mary Magdalen, and Anthony of Padua. The saints are thought to represent four of the sacraments of the church respectively: marriage, baptism, extreme unction, and confirmation.

The oratory has now been converted into a civic museum, displaying artifacts preserved by the confraternity associated with the oratory, including an 18th-century predella, a 1785 processional baldacchino, and other processional crosses and artifacts. Among the paintings are a Holy Family attributed to Innocenzo Francucci and a Madonna della Misericordia (circa 1420) in a Byzantine style. Various religious statuary and decoration are present. There is a 19th-century statue of St John the Baptist by Giambattista Latini.
