= Civitanova Marche Lighthouse =

Lighthouse in Italy

Civitanova Marche lighthouse
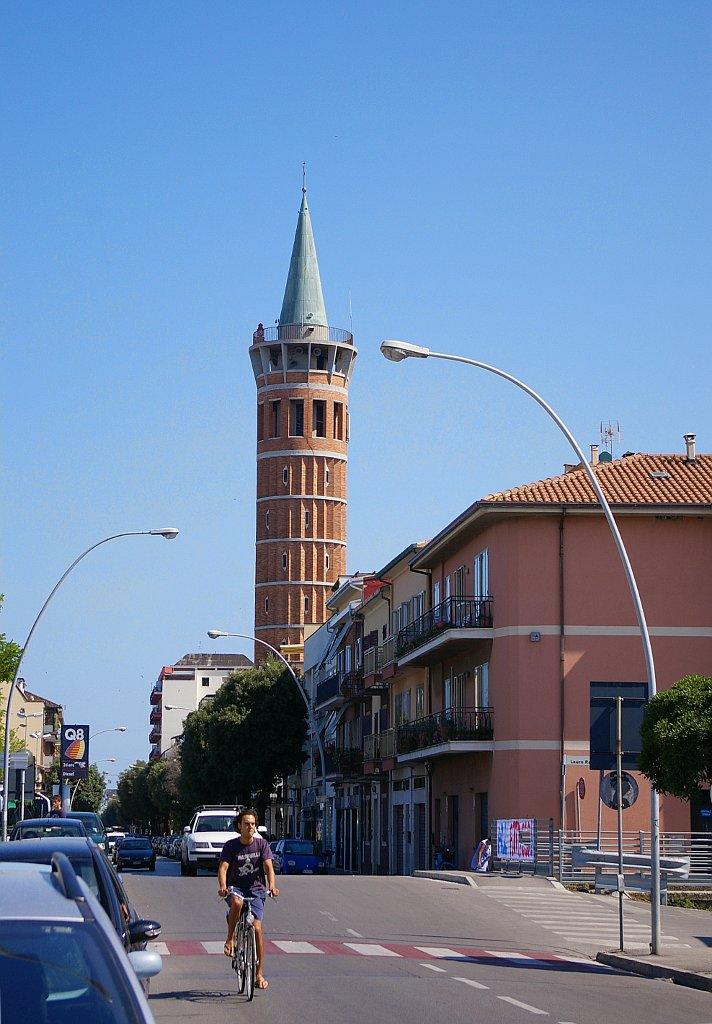
- Location: Civitanova Marche; Marche; Italy
- Coordinates: 43°18′38″N 13°43′41″E

Tower
- Constructed: 1967
- Foundation: concrete base
- Construction: masonry church bell tower
- Automated: yes
- Height: 46 metres (151 ft)
- Shape: cylindrical bell tower with gallery and tented roof
- Markings: red brick bell tower, green tented roof
- Power source: mains electricity
- Operator: Marina Militare

Light
- Focal height: 42 metres (138 ft)
- Lens: Type TD
- Intensity: MaxiHalo-60 II EFF
- Range: 11 nautical miles (20 km; 13 mi)
- Characteristic: Fl (4) W 20s.
- Italy no.: 3912 E.F.

Civitanova Marche Lighthouse (Italian: Faro di Civitanova Marche) is an active lighthouse located in front of the Port of Civitanova Marche, Marche on the Adriatic Sea.

== History ==
The lighthouse is settled on the bell tower of the Church of Cristo Re; the construction of the church begun in 1933 on plan of Gustavo Stainer but was completed only in the 1980s. The bell tower was built on project of Dante Tassotti and the lighthouse was activated in 1967.

== Description ==
The structure consists of a red bricks cylindrical tower, 46 feet (14 m) high, with the lantern placed on the balcony accessible climbing 285 steps or with a lift. The lantern is positioned at 43 metres (141 ft) above sea level and emits four white flashes in a 20 seconds period, visible up to a distance of 11 nautical miles (20 km; 13 mi). The lighthouse is completely automated and operated by the Marina Militare with the identification code number 3912 E.F.

== See also ==
- List of lighthouses in Italy
- Civitanova Marche
