= Santissimo Crocifisso d'Ete, Mogliano =

Roman Catholic church in Marche, Italy

The church of the Santissimo Crocifisso d´Ete is a Roman Catholic church located at the intersection of the roads to Montegiorgio and Francavilla d'Ete, in the town limits of Mogliano, province of Macerata, in the region of Marche, Italy.

== History ==
The site of the church had a miraculous aedicule with a fresco of the Crucifixion. Construction of the church of the SS. Crucifix of Ete was patronized in 1579 by the bishop of Fermo. The pope Gregory XIII granted the local confraternity of the Santissimo Sacramento permission to build the church. Later the shrine gained a fragment of the True Cross brought to this town in the first half of the 18th century.

The brick façade is sober. The church has a Latin cross layout with chapels at the transept. In the apse is a Renaissance-style tempietto with doric columns supporting an octagonal dome, much like a ciborium.

In the arches, except for the facade, are a series of frescoes (1594) by Pier Francesco Renolfi from Novara.
