= Civitanova Marche =

Municipality in Marche, Italy

- Comune
- Comune di Civitanova Marche
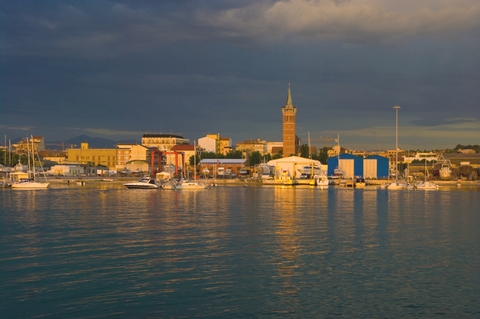
- View of the port of Civitanova Marche

- Civitanova within the Province of Macerata

- Location within Marche Location within Italy
- Coordinates: 43°18′N 13°44′E
- Country: Italy
- Region: Marche
- Province: Macerata (MC)
- Frazioni: Civitanova Alta, Fontespina, Maranello, Risorgimento, San Marone, Santa Maria Apparente

Government
  - Mayor: Fabrizio Ciarapica (Vince Civitanova)

Area
  - Total: 45.8 km^{2} (17.7 sq mi)
- Elevation: 3 m (9.8 ft)

Population (1 January 2018)
  - Total: 42,353
  - Density: 925/km^{2} (2,400/sq mi)
- Demonym: Civitanovesi
- Time zone: UTC+1 (CET)
  - Summer (DST): UTC+2 (CEST)
- Postal code: 62012
- Dialing code: 0733
- Patron saint: San Marone
- Saint day: August 18
- Website: Official website

Civitanova Marche (Italian pronunciation: [ˌtʃivitaˈnɔːva ˈmarke]) is a comune (municipality) in the Province of Macerata in the Italian region Marche, located about 40 kilometres (25 miles) southeast of Ancona and about 25 km (16 mi) east of Macerata.

== Geography ==
Civitanova Marche borders the municipalities: Montecosaro, Porto Sant'Elpidio, Potenza Picena and Sant'Elpidio a Mare. It counts the hamlets (frazioni) of Civitanova Alta, Fontespina, Maranello, Risorgimento, San Marone and Santa Maria Apparente.

=== Geography ===
The territory is heterogeneous. In the southern Risorgimento, Centro and Santa Maria Apparente districts, the city lies on the Chienti river floodplain, formed in the Holocene. Along the coast, the Centro, Fontespina and San Gabriele districts lie partially on coastal plain sediments.

The area is 46.07 km^{2}. The altitude ranges from 3 to 223 meters above sea level. The typical "a pettine" shape that distinguishes Marche hills is recognizable.

=== Climate ===
According to the climatic averages between 1971 and 2000, the average temperatures of the coldest month, January, is 5.3 °C, while in the hottest month, August, it is 22.6 °C.

The annual average precipitation is about 740 mm, with a relative minimum in spring and a maximum in fall.

Annual average relative humidity is 76%, with a minimum of 71% in July and a maximum of 82% in November.

== History ==
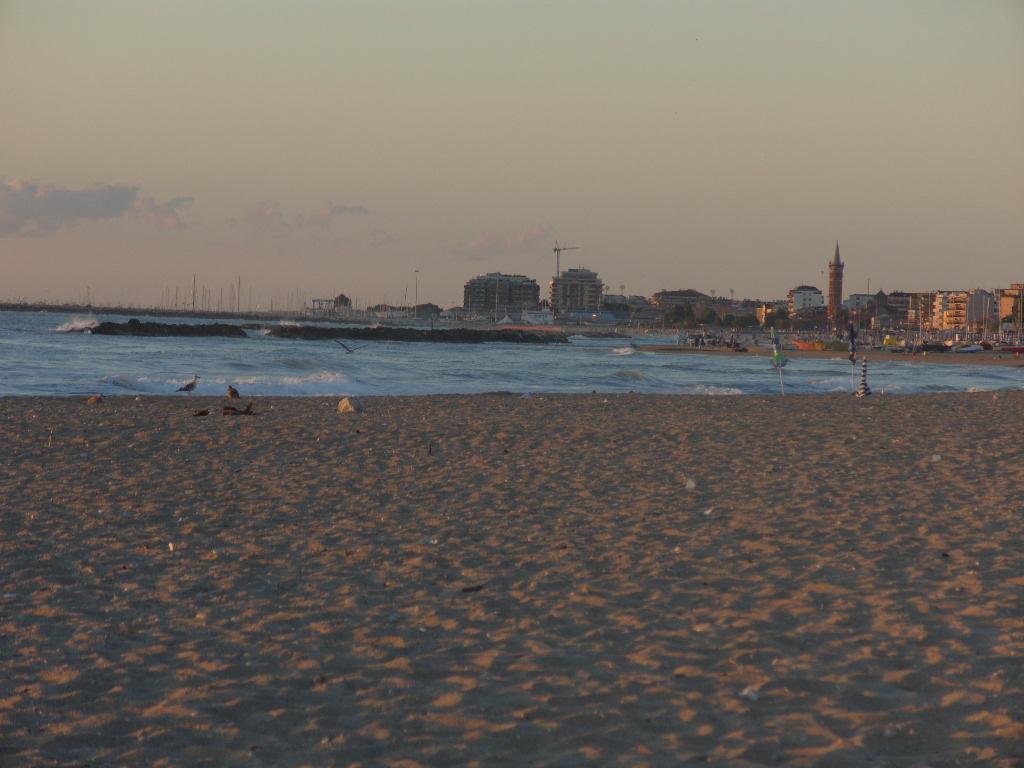
View of the bayside of Civitanova Marche

=== Ancient Age ===
Prehistorical settlements discovered by archaeologists show us that people used to live in Civitanova since Palaeolithic. Civitanova was founded probably around the 8th century BC as Cluana by the Piceni Italic tribe, at the mouth of the Chienti river. The Romans captured it in 268 BC, and, in 50 AD, founded a new settlement, Cluentis Vicus (the current frazione of Civitanova Alta) on a hill near the sea. During the Migration Period, old Cluana was destroyed by the Visigoths and much of the population took refuge in the Vicus.

=== Middle Ages ===
Cluentis Vicus is mentioned in 1009 as Civitate Nova, Civitas Nova, Civitatem Novam e Nova Civitas. People go live near the coast, on the San Marone hill, where there is a memorial dedicated to the martyr San Marone protector of Civitanova.

With the arrival of the Franks, Cluentis Vicus became a feudal town. In 1075, the Aldonesi family (or Aldonensi), together with the bishop of Fermo Pietro I, guaranteed the defense of the city. Then it was under the da Varano, Malatesta, Sforza and Visconti.

=== Modern Age ===
In 1440, under Francesco Sforza, a new line of walls was built (called "Scarpata", or "Escarpment"), while a fortress was built to protect the port (the current communal palace "Cesarini-Sforza" was built on its remains). The city, attacked by Turk pirates, riven by internal feuds and by the plague, started to decay from the 16th century.

In 1551 Pope Julius III (born in Grottammare, not far from Civitanova) named Cesarini a Duke. In 1674 the family took the name Cesarini–Sforza, following the marriage between Livia Cesarini and Federico Sforza of Santa Fiora. This event began a period of renewal: a new wall for the "Città Alta" was built, as well as new roads and palaces.

In 1569, the Jews of Civitanova were expelled. Prior to the expulsion, Jews were subject to other persecutory efforts by the Catholic authorities with one member of the community chronicling the rise of Pope Paul IV (dubbed in the chronicle as the "Evil Pope") and his involvement with the Italian Inquisition.

During the 17th and the 18th centuries, the "Città Alta" was renovated, the main square was expanded and the church of San Paolo was built, while the civic tower was substituted by the clock tower.

The port was expanded, giving rise to another small town. In 1782 Civitanova had 6057 inhabitants, of whom 5717 lived in Città Alta, 65 in San Marone and 275 at the port.

=== Contemporary Age ===
On 12 December 1828, pope Leo XII conceded the title of City to the two towns, Civitanova Alta and Civitanova Porto. In 1833 the city had 8,400 inhabitants.

In 1841 construction began on the port's first church, Saint Paul, which was completed in 1853.

In 1913 the Civitanova Porto district was established as an independent municipality and in 1938 Civitanova Porto e Civitanova Alta were united under the name of Civitanova Marche.

Following nearby industrial development, Civitanova Porto became a popular location for summer resorts lived by the noble families of the hinterland. Count Pieralberto Conti (1923) built a racecourse and, in 1910, a house in Liberty style. The city developed into a popular vacation centre.

== Main sights ==
=== Ducal Palace (Palazzo Cesarini-Sforza) ===
The Ducal Palace Cesarini Sforza was built circa 1550 atop the base of a pre-existing building. Construction started about a year prior to the cession of Civitanova by Pope Julius III to the Roman noble Giuliano Cesarini in payment for a debt contracted by the Papal treasury. The interior conserves some 16th-century frescoes by Pellegrino Tibaldi. In 1674, the palace acquired the Sforza label, when Livia Cesarini married Federico Sforza of Santa Fiora. The palace was refurbished in the 19th century; and restored recently. It is situated in Piazza della Libertà of Civitanova Alta.

=== Palazzo Cesarini-Sforza (Civitanova Porto) ===
Palazzo Cesarini-Sforza was built in 1862 upon the remains of a 15th-century fortress. The Palace overlooks "Piazza XX Settembre" gardens which conserve the fountain that once decorated the centre of the square.

=== Palazzo della Delegazione ===
Built in 1867 according to the project of engineer Guglielmo Prosperi and realized by the Basile brothers, it has three floors oriented towards the square of Civitanova Alta. The ground floor, characterized by a loggia with the ingress at the centre, hosts the Roman gravestone where ancient Civitanova name Cluentensis Vicus is carved. Wide stairs lead to the board room frescoed with Aeneid depictions dedicated to the poet Annibal Caro as well as portraits of noble citizens.

=== Lido Cluana ===
Over the gardens of Piazza XX Settembre there are liberty buildings of Lido Cluana, reworked during the fascist period with the add of fascist flagpoles that can be observed even today.

=== Villa Conti ===
Villa Conti is a liberty villa built in 1910, completely destroyed during World War II and consequently rebuilt. Located between Civitanova Alta and Civitanova Porto, characterized by a park with an Italian garden. Next to the villa there is a neo-gothic church which is the reproduction of Cappuccini Nuovi of Macerata. In the crypt of San Micheal Arch Angel Church there are the tombs of counts Conti as well as the tomb of the lyrical singer Francisca Solari, second wife of Pier Alberto Conti.

On the property, there is a 15th-century tower and the San Micheal luxury palace, rare example of art nouveau on the Macerata provence. The luxury palace is perfectly conserved and it's built according to architect Paolo Sironi project.

=== Villa Eugenia ===
Villa Eugenia is located on San Marone hamlet, commissioned by Napoleon I in 1797. The villa is not open to visitors. Previous inhabitants include Empress Eugenia De Montijo, wife of Napoleon III.

=== 15th century walls ===
Perfectly conserved, these walls are a good example of military Renaissance architecture. Commissioned in 1440 by the Sforza family along with the four S.Paolo, Girone, Mercato and S.Angelo doors.

=== Sanctuary of San Marone ===
The San Marone church is located on San Marone hamlet, in the lower part of the city. Originally in Romanesque style, erected on the location of the protector martyr. The sanctuary has a central naive as well as two lateral ones and conserves ancient architectural remains; the façade has a lunette in the main gate where there is the depiction of the Virgin with Child between San Marone and Santa Domitilla, work realized at the end of the 19th century by Sigismondo Nardi. The remains of the saint are conserved under the altar. In this sanctuary, 13 May 1823, Sante Possenti, governor of the Papal States and Agnese Frisciotti of Civitanova got married.

=== Saint Augustine Church ===
The original structure of the Saint Augustine church belongs to the XIII° century. During the 18th century the church has been reworked and entitled to Saint Augustine. The restructuration has allowed the construction of the dome at the centre of the transept and the new chapels with altars along the naive.

=== Saint Francis Church ===
The Saint Francis church, erected during the 14th century and reworked during the 18th century, the original structure conserves the gothic portal, remains of the romanesque-gothic decoration of the sides and the bell tower. Currently it is used as a multimedia space, for conferences and exhibitions.

=== Collegiate Church of Saint Paul Apostle ===
San Paolo Apostolo was built during the 17th century, and had been already a collegiate church. On the inside of the church there are: a font dated 1423 related according to the tradition to San Marone, a Nativity of Mary by Andrea Briotti (1561) and a Crucifixion by Durante Nobili da Caldarola (1508–1578). On 9 April 1801, Countess Nobildonna Agnese Frisciotti gets baptized.

=== Cristo Re Church ===
Main church of the city. Modern building whose construction began in 1933 according to the project of Gustavo Steiner and finished in the Eighties, the church distinguishes itself for its stained-glass window and for the bell tower projected by architect Dante Tssotti. The bell tower serves as a lighthouse as well, indicating the letters C and M in Morse Code, initials of Civitanova Marche.

== Culture ==
=== Library ===
- City Library "Silvio Zavatti"

=== Theaters ===
- Cine-Theater "G. Rossini": built in the first half of the 20th century. Baritone Sesto Bruscantini began his career in this place with his exhibitions in 1939 in Geisha by Sidney Jones playing the part of Wun-Hi and in 1946 in Bohème, playing the part of Colline, next to Mafalda Favero. The theater was rebuilt in 1999.
- Theater "Annibal Caro": theater all'italiana located in Civitanova Alta in via A.Caro. Built in 1872 according to the project of Guglielmo Prosperi. Closed for several years, the theater was reopened to the public in July 1997.
- Theater "Enrico Cecchetti": located in "Viale Vittorio Veneto", where the "ex Casa del Balilla" lays, now city library and theater. The project was carried out in 1933 by architect Adalberto Libera.
- Arena "La barcaccia"

=== Cinema ===
In 1978 Stelvio Massi directed half of his movie "Un poliziotto scomodo" with Maurizio Merli.

== Sport ==
The San Savino Speedway Park (a motorcycle speedway track) was located in the municipality, to the northwest on the crossroads, where Contrada San Savino, Località San Savino and Via San Savino all meet. It was a significant venue for important events, including qualifying rounds of the Speedway World Team Cup in 1975 and 1985.

== People related to Civitanova Marche ==
Among the renowned citizens of Civitanova, the first place goes to Annibal Caro, writer, translator, playwright and poet. His most famous work was the translation in hendecasyllabic of the Aeneid by Virgil. Furthermore he translated the Poetics by Aristotle, Daphnis and Chloe by Longus and Epistulae morales ad Lucilium by Seneca.

- Annibal Caro (1507–1566), writer, translator, playwright and poet.
- Enrico Cecchetti (1850–1928), dancer and choreographer.
- Sibilla Aleramo (1876–1960), writer and journalist of L'Unità.
- Arnoldo Ciarrocchi (1916–2004), artist.
- Silvio Zavatti (1917–1985), explorer and politician.
- Sesto Bruscantini (1919–2003), bass e baritone.
- Stelvio Massi (1929–2004), director and director of photography.
- Claudio Bizzarri (born 1933), football player.
- Franco Uncini (born 1955), champion of motorcycling.
- Oliviero de Quintajé (1959–2008) musician and songwriter.
- Antonio Santori (1961–2007), poet.
- Gianmarco Tamberi (born 1992), athlete, high jumper.
- San Gabriele dell'Addolorata (1838–1862)
- Francesco Annibali (born 1973), wine journalist.
- Ilaria Pascucci (born 1975), astrophysicist.
- Sante Possenti (1791–1872), Governor of Papal State, father of San Gabriele dell'Addolorata
- Agnese Frisciotti (1801–1842), noble e Countess, Mother of San Gabriele dell'Addolorata
- Alika Ogorchukwu (c. 1983–2022), labourer and street vendor

== International relations ==
Civitanova Marche is twinned with:

- Esine, Italy, since 1989
- Šibenik, Croatia, since 2002
- San Martín, Argentina, since 1990
- Skawina, Poland, since 2005

== See also ==
- Civitanovese Calcio
