= Monastery of San Giuseppe, Mogliano =

Convent in Italy

The Monastery of San Giuseppe is a Roman Catholic cloistered female convent located in Via Regina Margherita #8 at the town limits of Mogliano, province of Macerata, in the region of Marche, Italy.

== History ==
The monastery was built in 1630 by the Benedictines of Monte Cassino, and they remained here for nearly two centuries. In 1855, the convent was assigned to the sisters of the order of San Giuseppe di Torino (Suore di San Giuseppe di Torino), a small religious order who still occupy the facility in 2016. The convent, refurbished in 1777, is partially cloistered and thus the paintings found on the doors of the nun's rooms with saints above and landscapes below are not generally open to the public.

The adjacent church of Santi Crisogono e Benedetto was decorated in a late-Baroque style. The wood ceiling has framed squares (cassetoni) with carved decoration. The main altar is elegantly built with colored marble and gilded wood frames and statuary. The church of San Crisogono once was located inside the castle of Montechiaro. The castle was located between the town of Mogliano and Corridonia. Destroyed in the 14th-century, the castle church's title was transferred to this church. After the erection of the adjacent Benedictine nunnery, and by 1652, the church was being designated in documents with the names of the two saints, Crisogono and Benedict.

Refurbishments of the church took place in the 17th century with new stucco work and a decorated organ loft. The hemicircular apse marble pilasters and the gilded statues of St Benedict and Santa Scolastica were added in this period. The church has a 16th-century main altarpiece depicting the Madonna and Child with Saints James Major, Lucy, Catherine, and Crisogono attributed to followers of Giovanni Bellini.
