= Giuseppe Sacconi =

Italian architect (1854–1905)

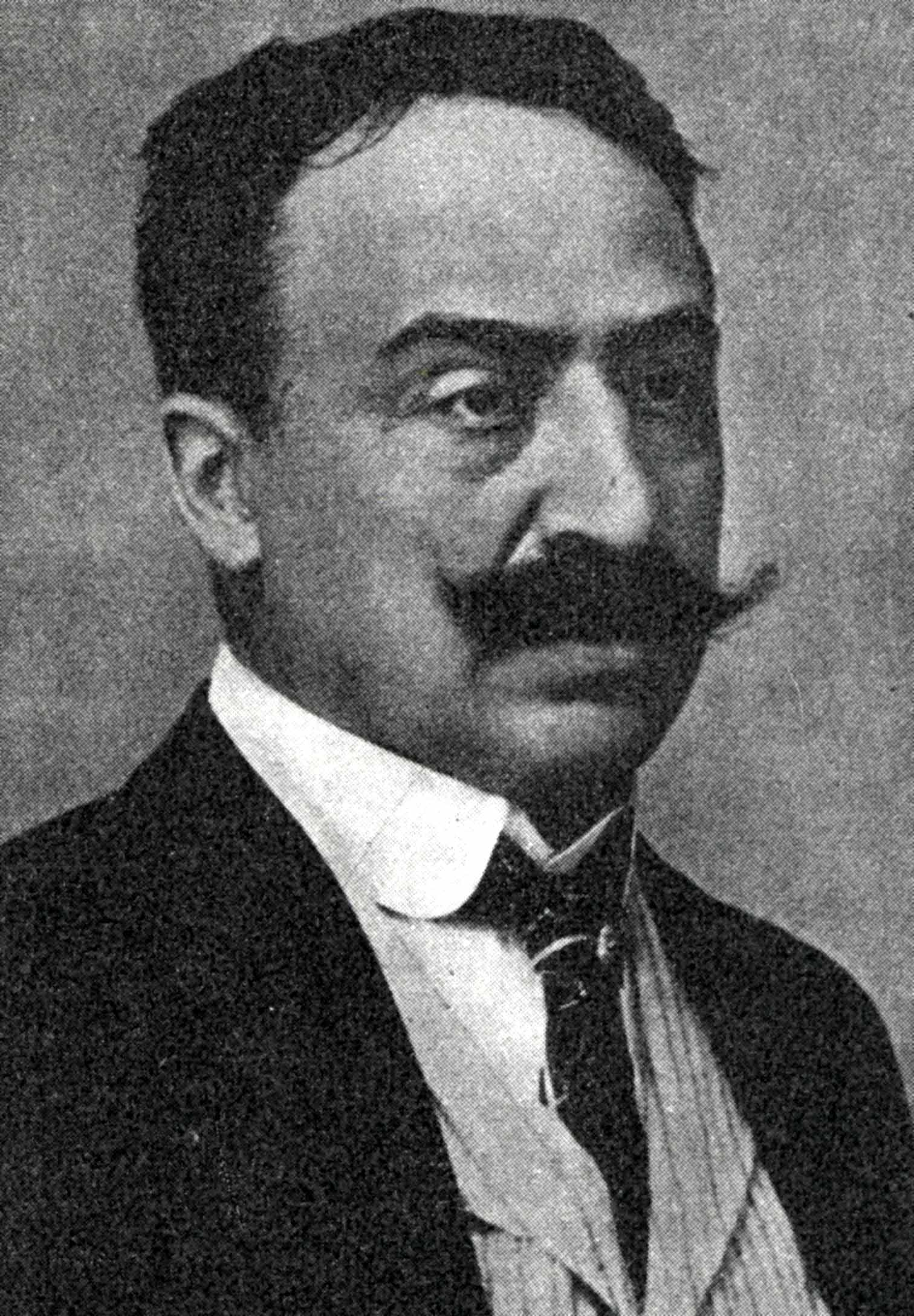
- Born: 5 July 1854; Montalto delle Marche
- Died: 23 September 1905 (aged 51); Collegigliato, Pistoia
- Known for: Architecture
- Movement: neoclassicism

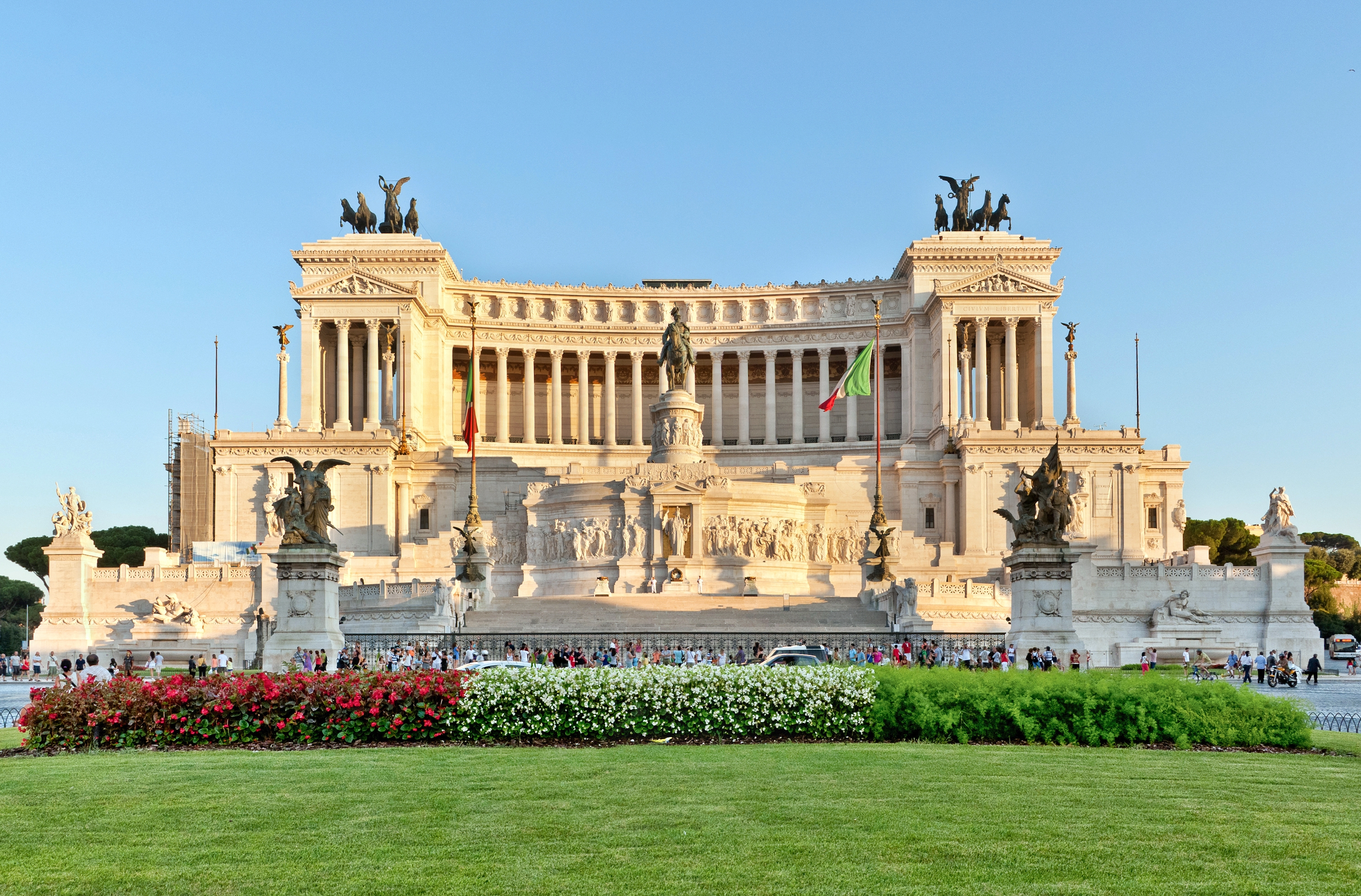
Victor Emmanuel II monument

Giuseppe Sacconi (Montalto delle Marche, 5 July 1854 - 23 September 1905) was an Italian architect. He is best known as the designer of the monument of Vittorio Emanuele II, in the centre of Rome. Following the prestigious commission, he became one of the protagonists of the artistic culture of post-unification Italy, which was then engaged in heated debates aimed at creating a "national style". He was also a restorer of some famous monuments.

== Career ==
In 1884, Sacconi won the competition to design the Victor Emanuel II Monument in Rome, and began building in the following year, though it was not finished until several years after his death. The monument celebrates the Risorgimento and the battles for national unity, has neoclassical and eclectic style, with many works of art that are affected by the Art Nouveau; it is today seen by the most up-to-date art critics as an important step in the search for a national style, which was to characterize the Kingdom of Italy recently established. Although the monument to Vittorio Emanuele was generally immediately appreciated for its artistic value, some art scholars expressed criticisms of the monument style.

Sacconi served as Superintendent of Monuments for Ascoli Piceno and Umbria from 1891 till 1905. But he remained active in the restoration of buildings in the Italian capital Rome. Sacconi worked on the restoration of the Basilica di Loreto, a work in which he aimed to remove all baroque and other changes and additions, and restore the original form to the entire building. He also made the design for the Expiatory Chapel of Monza and restored the Basilica of Saint Francis of Assisi and the Ancona Cathedral. He died in Collegigliato, Pistoia.

== Fascist Italy ==
During the fascist-era the Victor Emanuel II Monument would become the main scene of Mussolini's regime. In the 1970s, this greatly contributed to the general downgrading of the monument. Starting from the 2000s, the Vittoriano has been rediscovered in its artistic, historical and symbolic values. It is one of national symbols of Italy.
