= Durante Nobili =

Italian Renaissance painter

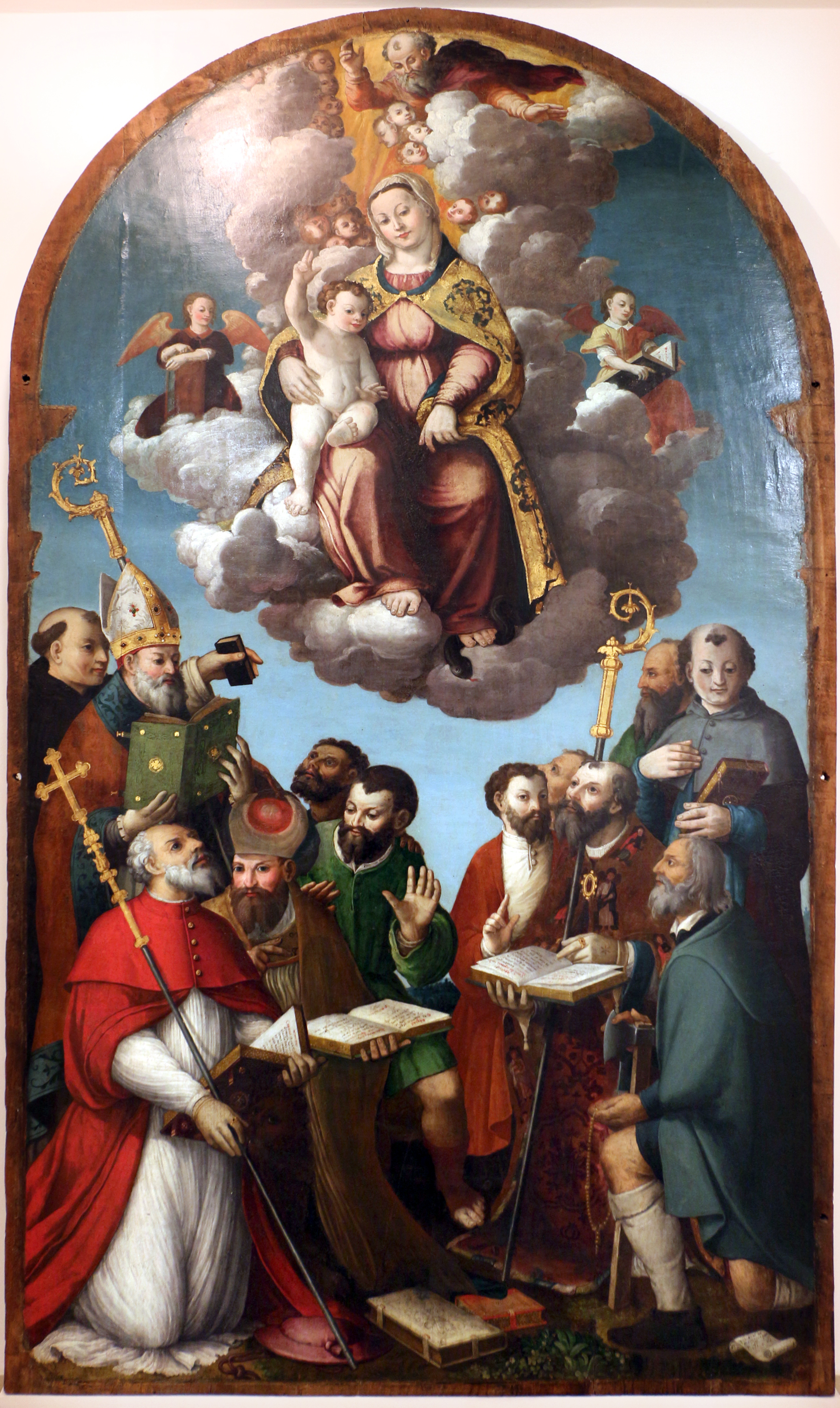

Durante Nobili (1518 – after 1553) was an Italian painter of the Renaissance period.

He was born in Caldarola. He was a pupil and collaborator of Lorenzo Lotto from 1550 to 1553. After his apprenticeship, he worked in Ascoli Piceno, Mogliano, Macerata, Matelica, Recanati, and Corridonia. In 1535, he painted Madonna and child with Saints Cosmo and Damiano for the sacristy of the church of San Martino in Caldarola. He painted an altarpiece of the Immaculate Conception and a Madonna of the Rosary for the church of San Gregorio Magno, Mogliano, and a Conversation regarding the Immaculate Conception for Massa Ferrara, and a Crucifixion with Saints Nicola da Tolentino, Antonio da Padova, Crispino and with a Resurrection, Deposition, and Descent to Purgatory below for a church in Marca Montana, near Matelica. The work is inspired by Lotto's work for the church of Santa Maria in Telusiano in Monte San Giusto.
